= Royal Tomb of Akhenaten =

Ancient Egyptian tomb at Amarna

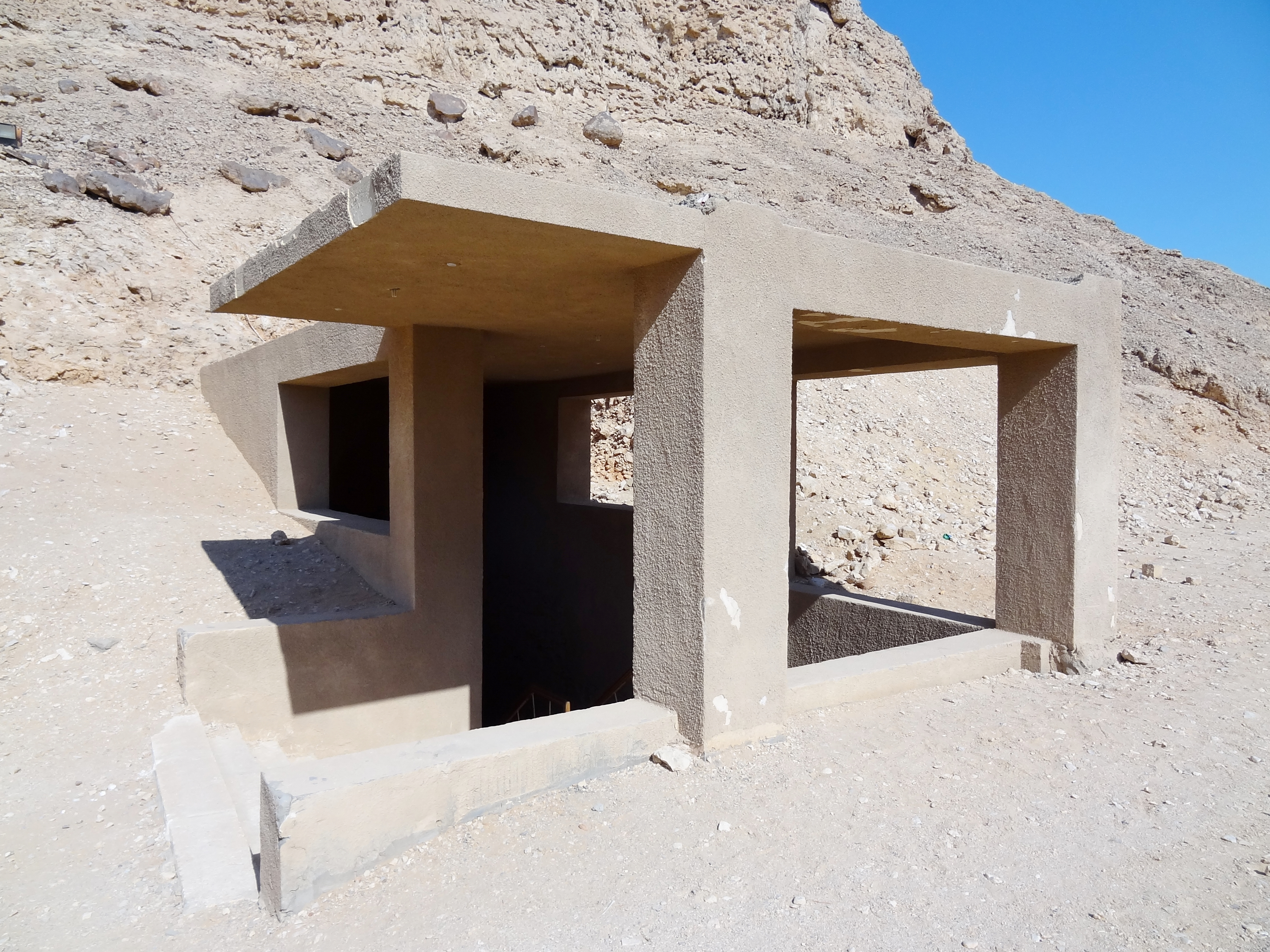
- Entrance of the Royal Tomb showing modern flood protection Original burial site of Amenhotep IV
- 27.6262°N 30.9852°E
- Type: Tomb
- Location: Minya, Egypt

History
- Built: c. 1332 BC

Site notes
- Material: Limestone
- Discovered: 28 December 1891 by Alessandro Barsanti

The Royal Tomb of Akhenaten is a multichambered tomb in the Royal Wadi east of Amarna, Egypt, where members of the Amarna Period royal family were originally buried. Akhenaten was an 18th Dynasty pharaoh who reigned for around 18 years from the capital city of Akhetaten, known today as Amarna. The Royal Tomb was rediscovered in the 1880s; however, the exact year and who discovered it is up for debate. Excavations and research into the tomb began in 1891 and continue to this day. The location of the Royal Tomb, the tomb itself, the artifacts contained within the tomb, and the destruction of parts of the Royal Tomb after Akhenaten's death provide researchers with valuable insights into Akhenaten's reign, including the political environment, and the Amarna Period.

Amenhotep IV's burial chamber can easily be detected in his royal tomb at Amarna since it is the only tomb which was fully finished; the rest of the tomb consists of unfinished rock cut tomb chambers and rooms which were likely meant to inter other members of the royal family such as his queen Nefertiti. However, work on the tomb stopped when the Egyptian royal family later moved to Thebes and abandoned Amarna under Tutankhaten around 3 years after Amenhotep IV's death.

== History ==
=== Burials and defacement ===
Amenhotep IV ruled as pharaoh c. 1353–1335 BC during the 18th Dynasty of the New Kingdom. He succeeded his father Amenhotep III. His Great Royal Wife was Nefertiti, with whom he had six known daughters: Meritaten, Meketaten, Ankhesenpaaten, Neferneferuaten Tasherit, Neferneferure, and Setepenre. The solar god Aten, representing the sun's disc, which had gained prominence under Thutmose IV and Amenhotep III, was elevated to the main deity in Amenhotep IV's reign. Early in his reign, he built several temples to the Aten at Karnak, and erected a stele on which he declared Aten the sole god, beginning a new religion known as Atenism where the king and his family served as the intermediaries between the god and the populace. The temples to other gods were closed, and some deities, especially Amun, had their names and images erased. In the fifth year of his reign, he changed his name to Akhenaten (meaning "Beneficial for Aten") and founded a new capital city, Akhetaten (meaning "The Horizon of the Sun's Disc"), a site known today as Amarna.

Amenhotep IV abandoned the traditional royal burial ground of the Valley of the Kings (where he may have started a tomb, WV25 or WV23) and began a new royal cemetery in the Royal Wadi at Akhetaten. He stated his intentions to be buried there on the Boundary Stelae, proclamations issued in Years 5 and 6 of his reign and carved into the cliffs to the east and west of the city. The text states:

Let a tomb be made for me in the eastern mountain of Akhetaten. Let my burial be made in it, in the millions of jubilees that my father, the Aten, has decreed for me. Let the burial of the Great King's Wife Nefertiti be made in it, in the millions of years that my father, the Aten, has decreed for her. Let the burial of the King's Daughter Meryetaten, be made in it, in these millions of years.

Like WV22, the tomb of Amenhotep III, Amenhotep IV's tomb included additional suites of rooms likely intended for the burial of his chief wife and eldest daughter. There is no evidence that Nefertiti or Meritaten were ever interred in the Royal Tomb as laid out on the Boundary Stelae. The tomb was never finished, instead being adapted to receive the burials of several other members of the royal family. When Amenhotep IV died in Year 17 of his reign, he shared the main burial chamber with his mother Tiye, who likely died after his reign. His second daughter Meketaten is thought to have died no later than Year 14 of her father's reign, and was interred in gamma, one of a small side suite of three rooms; room alpha of the same suite seems to have contained multiple burials.

When the royal court abandoned Amarna in the reign of Amenhotep IV's successor Tutankhaten, the burials from the Royal Tomb were transferred to the Valley of the Kings. The bodies of Tiye and an anonymous man (identified through DNA testing as Tutankhaten's father and thought to be Amenhotep IV) were reburied in tomb KV55; Tiye was later moved to the mummy cache in KV35.

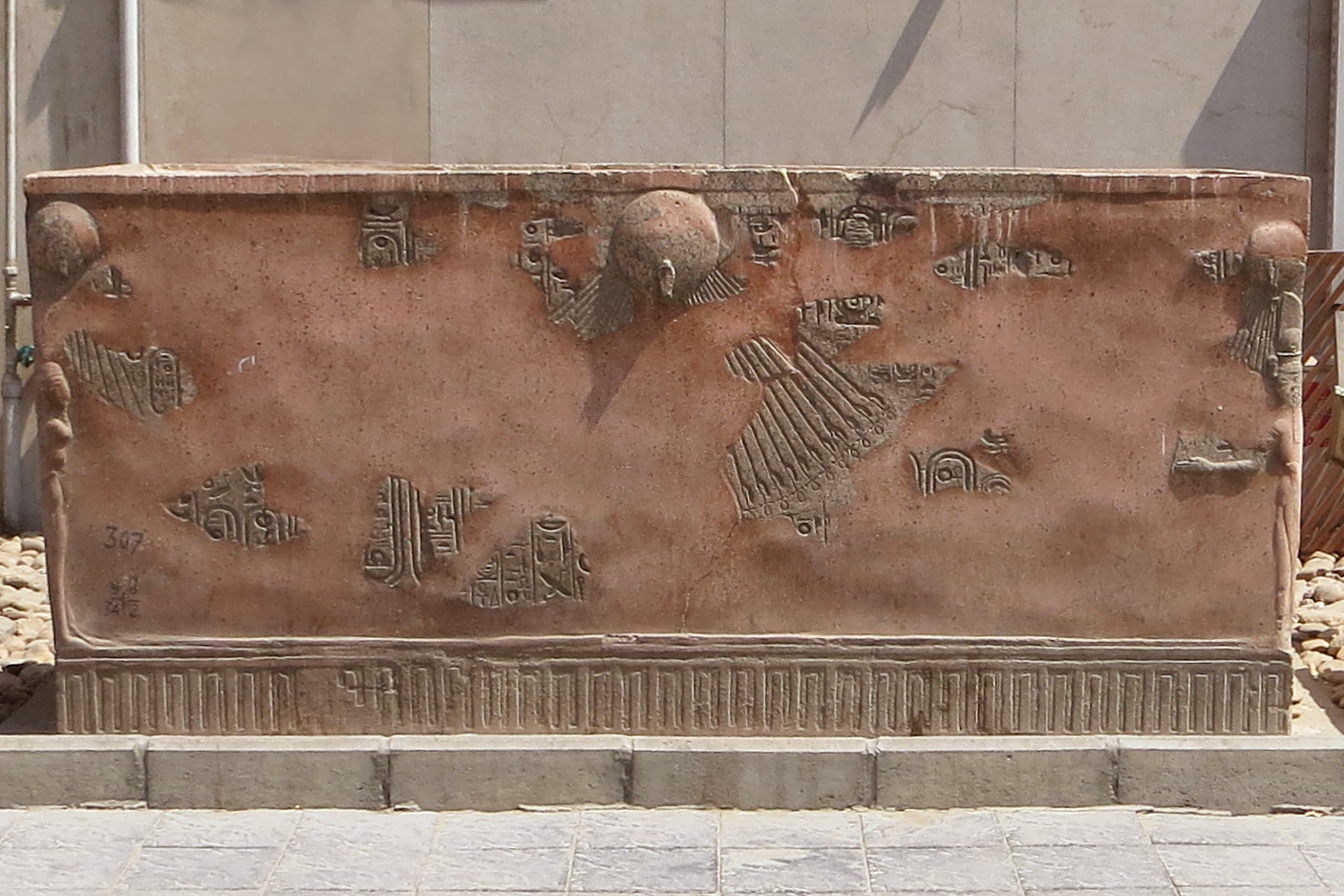
Reconstructed sarcophagus of Akhenaten, Egyptian Museum

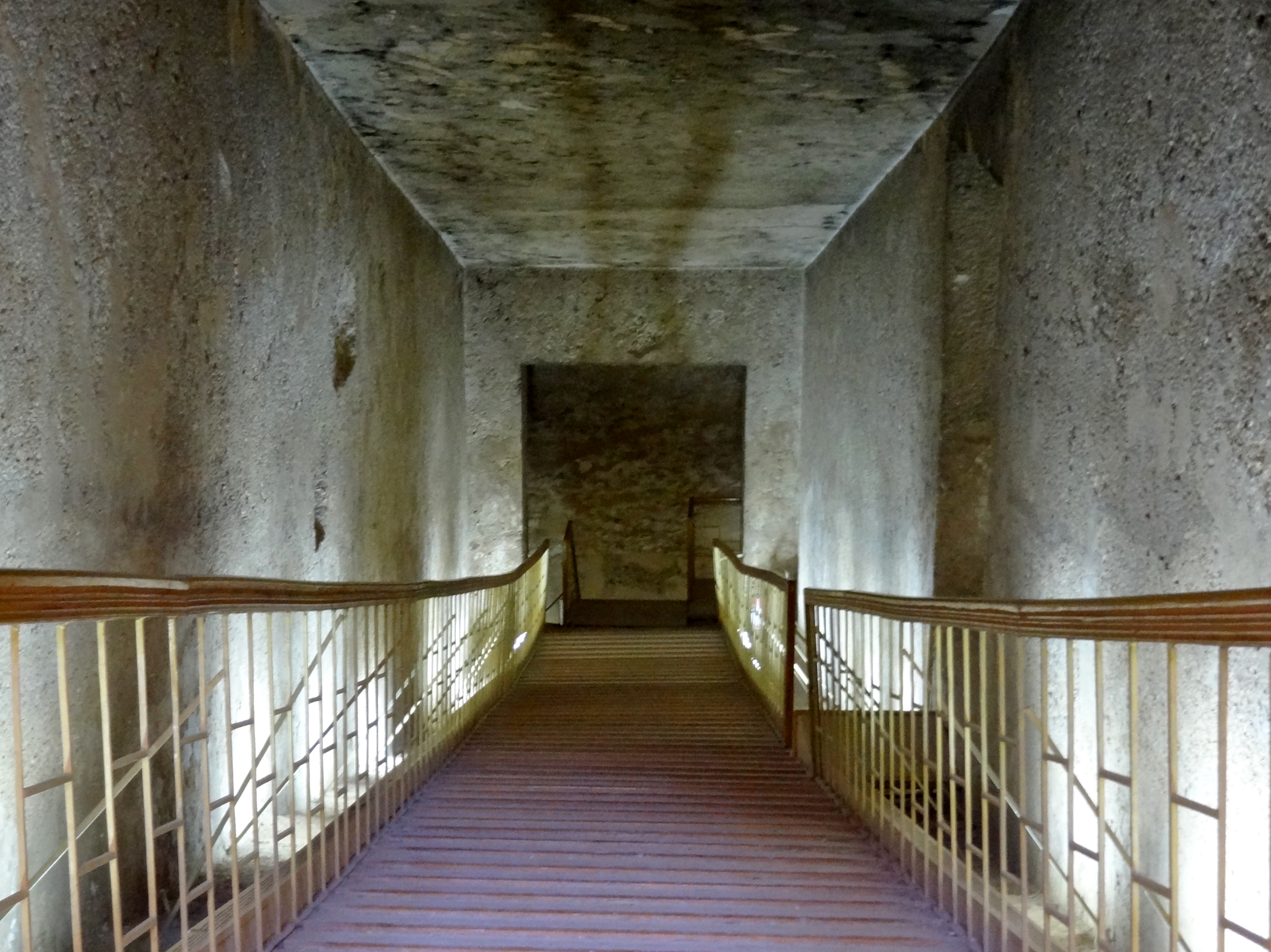
Entrance to the Royal tomb of Akhenaten

The reigns of Tutankhaten and his successors Ay and Horemheb saw the end of Atenism and the restoration of the traditional polytheistic religion. Many of Amenhotep IV's monuments and temples were dismantled, and his name and image were erased. Amenhotep IV, along with his successors, was omitted from the official king lists. A text from the 19th Dynasty refers to him as "the enemy of Akhetaten". In the Royal Tomb, the decoration and contents of the burial chamber especially were destroyed, including Amenhotep IV's sarcophagus, which did not contain his body.

=== Rediscovery ===
Officially, the Royal Tomb was rediscovered on 28 December 1891 by the Italian Egyptologist Alessandro Barsanti, but it is thought to have been located by local villagers in the early 1880s. In 1892, Egyptologist Flinders Petrie wrote that the tomb had been discovered "four or five years" before Barsanti's 1891 discovery by locals, who kept it a secret while removing any items they thought could be sold on, which would put the discovery by locals between 1886 and 1887. However, jewellery reportedly from the Royal Tomb, was sold to the Royal Scottish Museum in 1883, which supports the idea that local villagers discovered the tomb in the early 1880s (possibly after 1881). It is likely the locals kept the tomb's location a secret both to sell what they could onto the antiquities market and due to their mistrust of Egyptologists following the forced revealing of the location of the Royal Cache near Deir el-Bahari in 1881.

=== Expeditions ===
The first two expeditions were conducted by Alessandro Barsanti between 1891 and 1892. Barsanti and his team inspected the chambers within the Royal Tomb, took measurements, made drawings, collected artifacts, and began the process of clearing some of the chambers of debris. From 1893-1894, Urbain Bouriant conducted an epigraphic expedition with the intent of recording the "inscriptions and reliefs in the Royal Tomb". In 1931, John Pendlebury of the Egypt Exploration Society began the task of re-examining and re-excavating the area outside of the tomb, the dumps from Barsanti's excavations, and the interior of the tomb, including the shaft. In addition to the official expeditions, there may have been at least five unofficial expeditions prior to 1934. The final expedition conducted by Pendlebury in 1935 was done in hopes of discovering a second tomb, copying all the reliefs and inscriptions, and creating a photographic record. Geoffrey Martin recorded the remaining inscriptions and reliefs of the Royal Tomb between 1980 and 1982 with the support of the Egyptian Antiquities Organization. A survey of the tomb was conducted in 1980 by Mark Lehner. In 1977, the Supreme Council of Antiquities began the Amarna Project, led by Barry Kemp. Work on this project continues to this day.

In 1983, the Organisation of Egyptian Antiquites opened the tomb to tourists. Access within the tomb was improved through the installation of a wooden walkway in the main corridor; a road was constructed through the Royal Wadi to allow vehicle access.

== Architecture ==
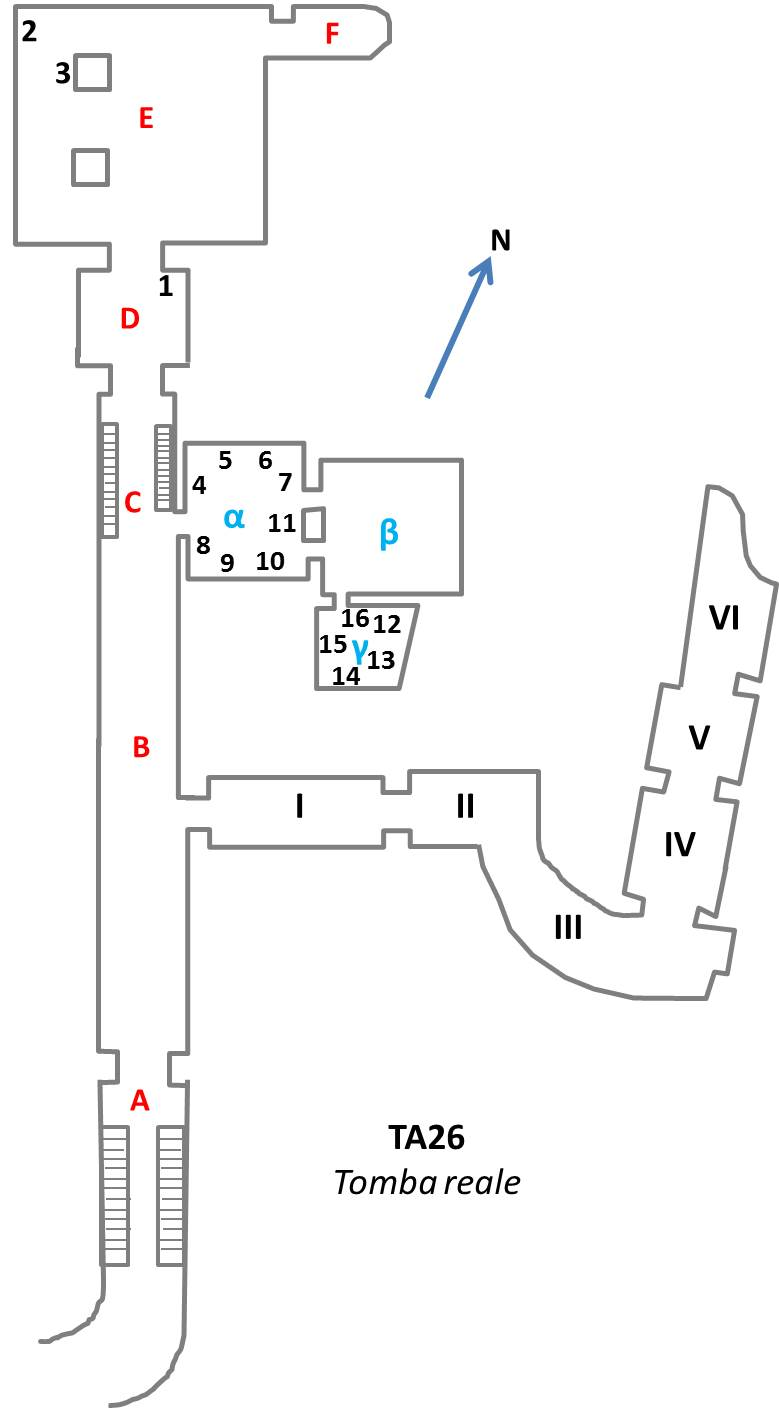
Plan of the Royal Tomb

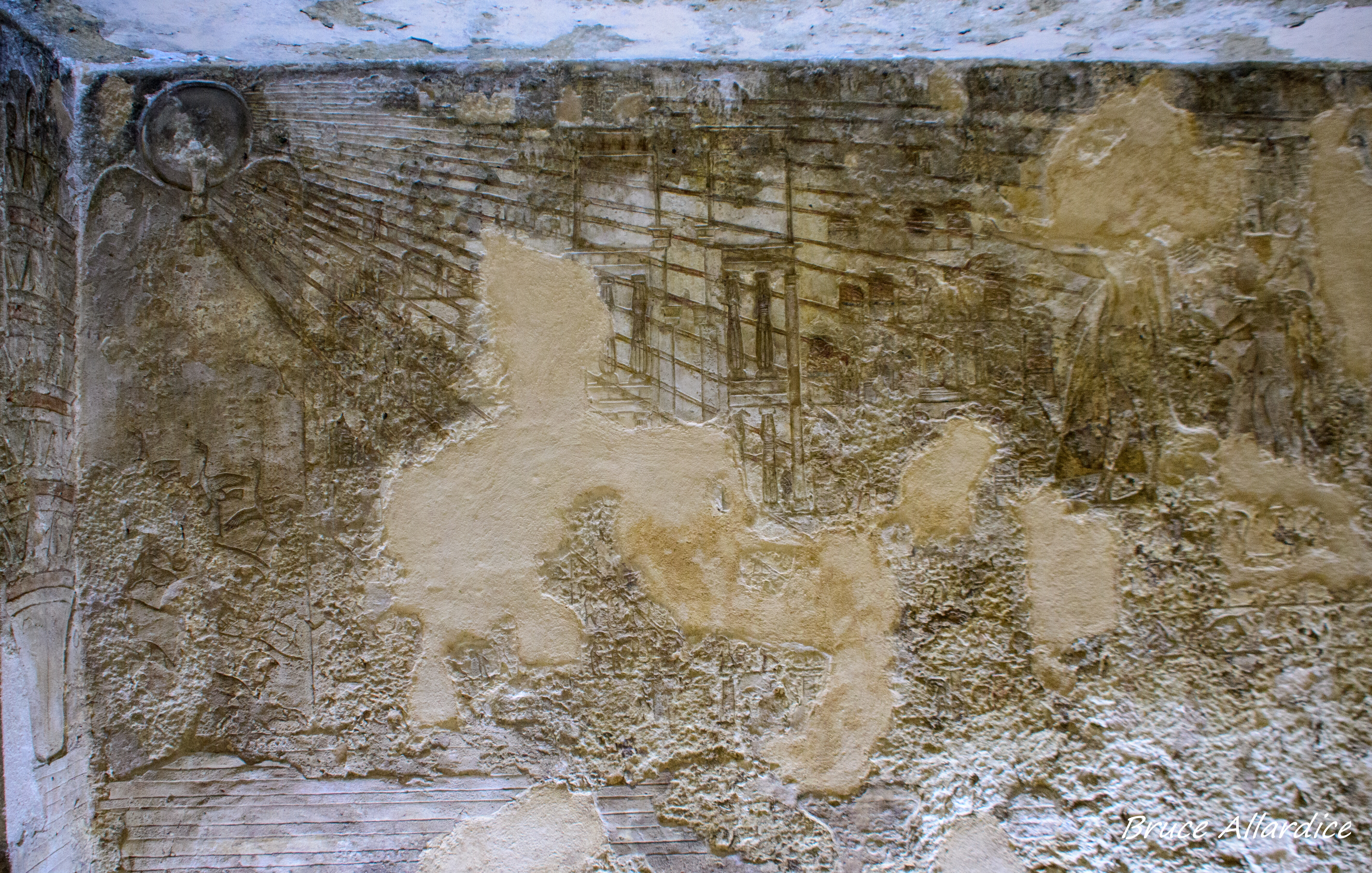
Defaced reliefs of Akhenaten and Nefertiti from the Royal Tomb

The Royal Tomb was cut in a small side valley off the main Royal Wadi, around 6 km (3.7 mi) from the valley's mouth and a further 4 km (2.5 mi) directly east of Amarna's central city. It lies on the same axis as the Small Aten Temple. The tomb was cut into the floor of the valley, facing approximately east (actually southeast). It descends back into the hillside for 53.245 m (174.69 ft). Unlike previous royal Theban tombs, it has a straight axis. It is thought this was intended to allow the sun's rays to shine all the way down into the burial chamber, something which does not work in practice due to the height of the valley's sides. The layout of the main portion of the tomb is not substantially different to prior tombs. It was only cut as far as the first pillared hall which was adapted, through the removal of two pillars, into the burial chamber. The small, unfinished room in its north corner may be the start of the conventional bent axis.

The Royal Tomb of Akhenaten consists of several chambers (some finished and some unfinished), a Pillared Hall (where Akhenaten's body was most likely located), several staircases, and corridors that are all plastered and decorated to varying degrees.

Entrance Staircase A and Corridor B: Contains 20 steps and a central slide leading to a corridor that extends to the "innermost parts of the tomb," and leads to several unfinished chambers. The corridor is "21.80m long, 3.20m wide, and 3.47m" high. Both show evidence of being plastered, but not decorated.

Stairway C: This stairway is 1.25 m (4.1 ft) wide and consists of a central ramp with 18 steps on the left side and 16 on the right. As with the entrance and first corridor, it is plastered and undecorated. The doorway to Shaft Room D was once blocked and sealed but was smashed through by ancient robbers. A doorway at the top of the stairs opens to the right, and leads to Room alpha; a corresponding, unfinished doorway was cut on the left wall.

Shaft Room D: The square shaft measures 3.12 m (10.2 ft) deep on the east side, and on the west side it is 3.05 m (10.0 ft) deep. In the north corner, blocking stones were recovered. The walls of the room were decorated. The doorway to Pillared Hall E is centred in the west wall instead of being offset to the left.

Pillared Hall E: It is the largest room in the tomb, measuring 10.36 m × 10.40 m (34.0 ft × 34.1 ft). Raised platforms can be found on the west and east sides of the hall. There are two pillars on the left side of the room. The remains of Akhenaten's sarcophagus were found in this room, meaning this is most likely where he was originally buried, but his body was not found in the sarcophagus. The tomb was initially plastered and decorated, but most of it was destroyed after Akhenaten's death due to political fallout.

Room F: This is a small, unfinished room in the north corner on the right side of the Pillared Hall. The doorway is incompletely cut but is plastered. It may have been the start of a right-turning corridor, or intended as a storeroom for burial equipment.

Room alpha: One of the unfinished chambers. One of the things that is noticeable about this room is that it contains four niches that are carved into the walls. The purpose of the niches was to "receive protective or ritualistic magical bricks and associated amulets." Most of the plaster and decorations remain in various degrees of completion. Based on the reliefs and inscriptions found within the chamber, Martin suggested that this room was meant for Akhenaten's minor wife Kiya.

Room beta: This room is very roughly cut and entirely unfinished; the floors and ceilings are on two different levels, and the two doorways to Room alpha are two different sizes, with different threshold heights.

Room gamma: One of the unfinished chambers with unfinished floors. The room was plastered and decorated. Decorations indicate that this chamber was meant for Akhenaten's daughter Meketaten. One of the reliefs indicates that Meketaten died during childbirth.

Rooms I-VI: This large suite of rooms are entered from Corridor B. All are unfinished and undecorated. The first two rooms are square and cut at a right angle to the axis of the royal tomb; the third room is corridor curved to the left. Room 4 is a steeply descending ramp leading to another square chamber. Room 6 is the largest but is incompletely cut and irregularly shaped. When projected onto a straight axis, these chambers have the same layout as the main royal tomb. The suite is thought to have been intended for Nefertiti.

== Decoration ==
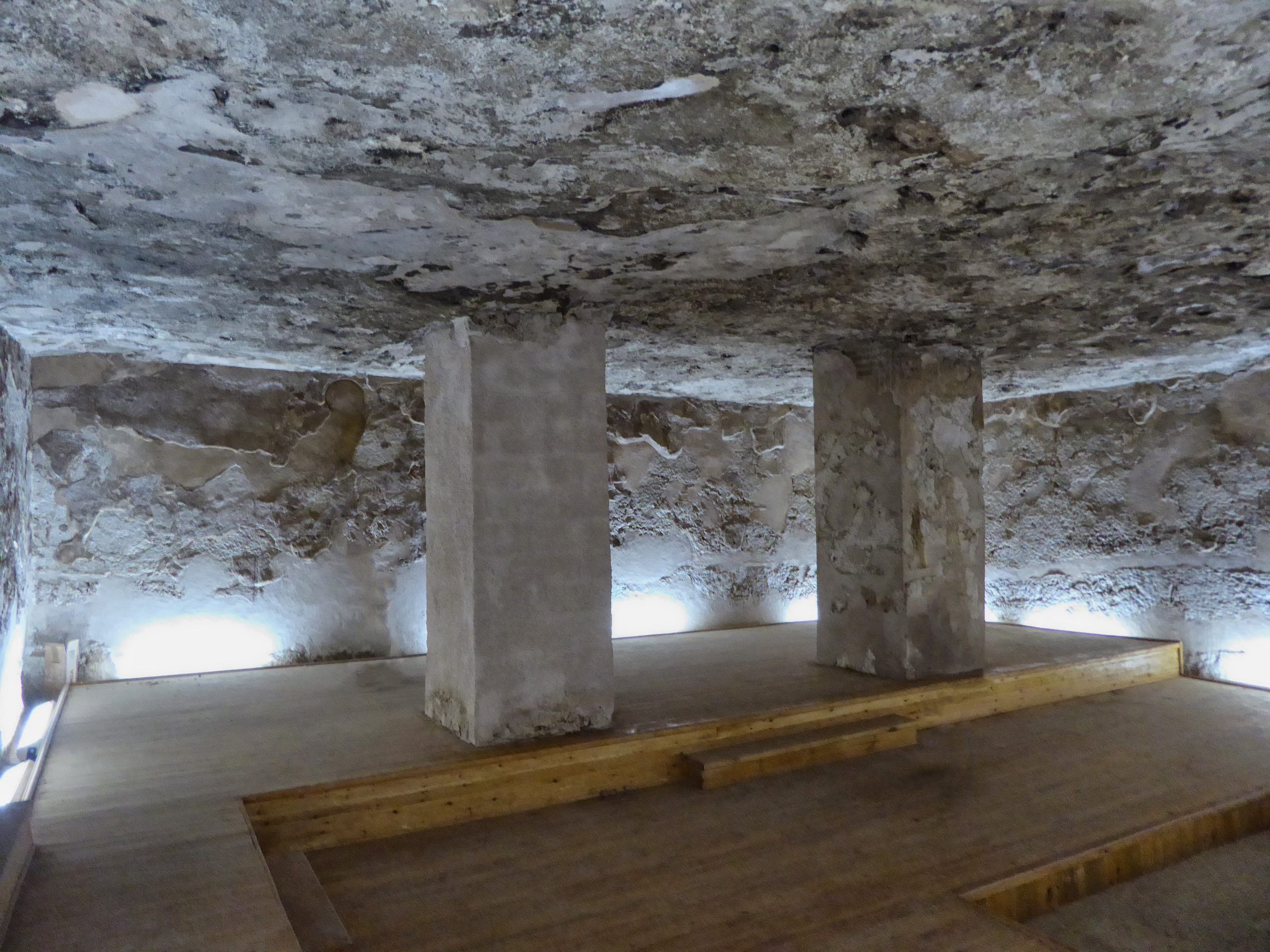
One view of the burial chamber of Akhenaten at Amarna

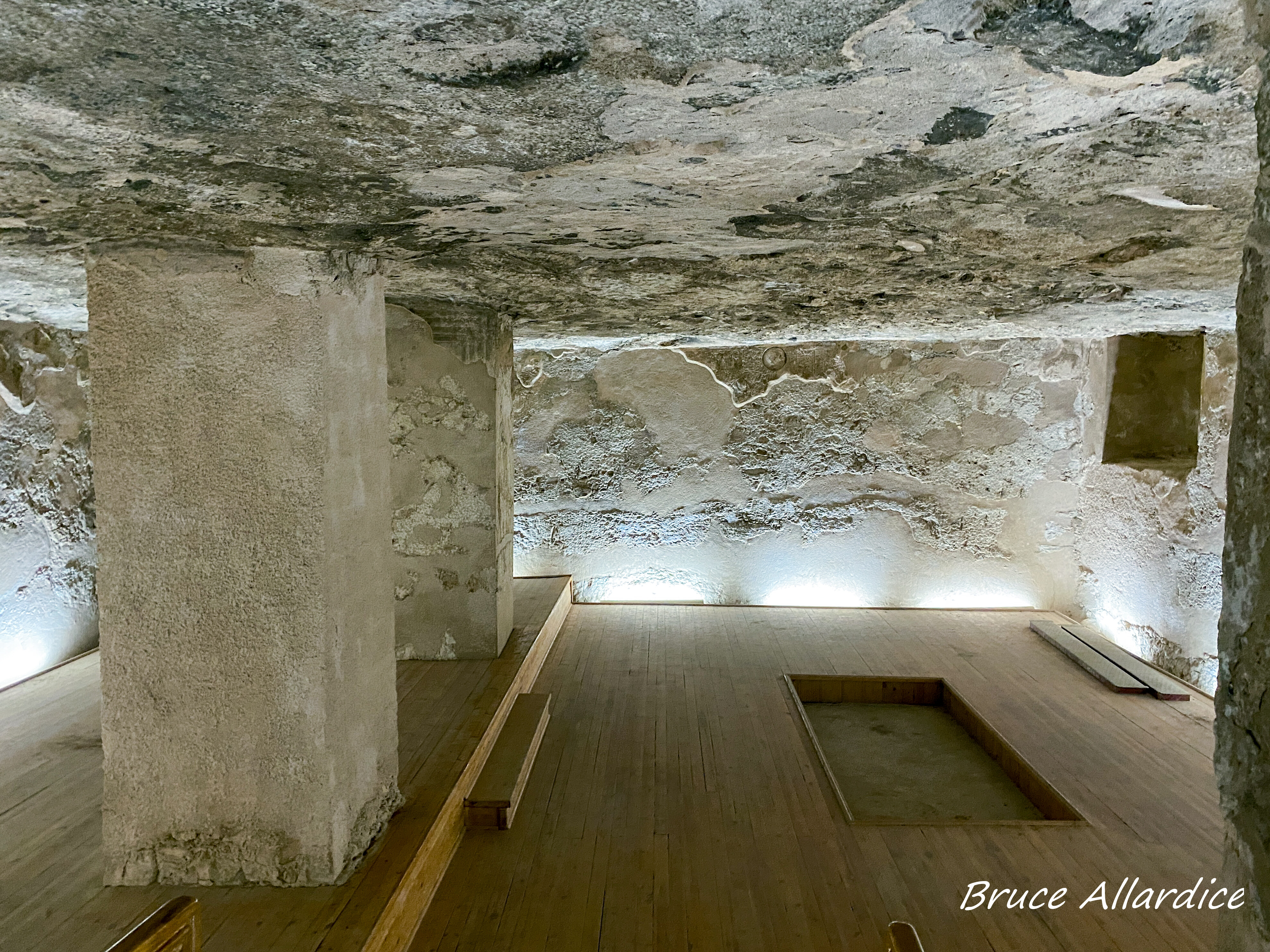
Another view of the burial chamber of Akhenaten at Amarna

Many of the walls within the Royal Tomb show signs of being plastered and/or decorated. The limestone rock into which the tomb was cut is largely of poor quality, being very hard and containing many flint nodules. This necessitated that the decoration, executed in relief for the first time in a New Kingdom royal tomb, be carved into a layer of applied plaster instead of directly into stone. The reliefs were originally painted in bright colours on a yellow background. None of the reliefs or inscriptions within the tomb mention the traditional Egyptian afterlife, which is inconsistent with the decorative scheme of tombs, especially those of royalty, during the New Kingdom whose walls typically featured scenes from funerary texts such as the Book of the Dead. Instead, the tomb is decorated with scenes of daily life. Since Amenhotep IV's death, many of the walls have been damaged by environmental factors, like flooding, and vandalism. Evidence of vandalism, during ancient times, can be seen in Pillared Hall E, where Amenhotep IV was likely originally laid to rest. In 1934, a feud between guards led to the vandalism of rooms alpha and gamma. Expeditions prior to 1934, however, were able to record and photograph some of these decorations prior to their destruction. Despite the damage, many decorations have survived and can be seen and studied today.

As was typical for the mid-18th Dynasty, only the walls of the well chamber and the burial chambers were decorated. The long walls of the well chamber depict Amenhotep IV and Nefertiti worshiping the Aten, with their daughters depicted on the short walls flanking the doorways; a large floral bouquet is carved on the short wall to the left of the entrance.

In the burial chamber, the best preserved scene is the short wall to the left of the doorway, in which the royal couple are shown making offerings to the Aten. Traces of decoration on the long left wall depicts the mourning of a royal woman, who wears the long queenly sash, and stands under a canopy; she is probably Queen Tiye, as Nefertiti stands in front of the kiosk and presents offerings with Amenhotep IV and their daughters. The rear wall depicts the royal family under the rays of the Aten. The disc is depicted five times, getting larger from left to right as it crosses the sky during the day. A floral bouquet is depicted beside the doorway to the unfinished room; the rest of the right wall contained a mourning scene, of which very little remains. The royal family were depicted presenting offerings to the Aten on the short wall to the right of the entrance of the burial chamber. The two pillars were also decorated. Only traces remain but they were likely carved with the figures of Akhenaten and Nefertiti making offerings under the rays of the Aten.

The decoration in the alpha and gamma rooms was well preserved until the 1930s; copies made in 1891 by Bouriant are used to reconstruct the damaged areas. The walls of alpha are thought to depict a visual representation of the Great Hymn to the Aten. On the right side, the royal family worship the rising sun in a temple, celebrated by animal life and foreign peoples; on the left side, a similar scene of sunset is shown. The short wall to the right of the door, conventionally designated wall F, is the most famous and frequently discussed scene in the entire tomb. It contains two nearly identical scenes of mourning in two registers. Inside a room, Amenhotep IV and Nefertiti bend over the inert body of a woman lying on a bed, weeping and gripping each other's arms for support. Outside, a nurse stands with a baby in her arms, accompanied by a fan-bearer, which indicates the baby's royal status. The names in both scenes have been hacked out. Aidan Dodson suggests that the two deceased women are the youngest daughters, Neferneferure and Setepenre, who are absent from the scenes in gamma.

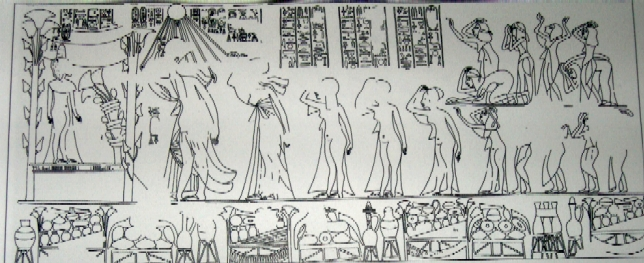
Scene from Room gamma, the tomb of Meketaten

In the gamma chamber, a very similar mourning scene is shown on the left wall; here the hieroglyphs identify the dead young woman on the bed as Meketaten. Again, a nurse holding a royal baby is depicted exiting the chamber; the inscription identifying the infant is badly damaged. A scene on the end wall shows Meketaten standing under a canopy, which is usually associated with childbirth, but can also be interpreted as representing the rebirth of the princess. In front of her, amongst courtiers, stand Amenhotep IV, Nefertiti, and their three remaining daughters, Meritaten, Ankhesenamun, and Neferneferuaten Tasherit; grieving courtiers continue onto the side wall. The small wall between the entry doorways shows burial goods such as jewellery, a mirror, and sealed amphorae.

The presence of a royal baby in these scenes has led many to believe that the women depicted died in childbirth. Martin suggests the woman in alpha is Kiya, a minor wife of Akhenaten, who has died giving birth to their child. Meketaten is thought to have been around 10 when she died, making this scenario unlikely. Dorothea Arnold has argued against a literal interpretation of the scenes, as the ancient Egyptians had a "well-known reluctance to depict anything like the cause of death", instead suggesting that the child represents her rebirth. Jacobus Dijk follows this interpretation and reconstructs the damaged inscription to identify the child as Meketaten herself, instead of her child or the youngest child of Nefertiti.

== Burial goods ==
Since excavations began in 1891, thousands of artifacts have been recovered from the Royal Tomb of Akhenaten. Artifacts found within the tomb include fragments from the sarcophagus, canopic chests, ushabtis, jewelry, scarabs, statues, pottery, and human remains. The artifacts were made out of many materials such as alabaster, faience, glass, limestone, and other stones, metal, and wood. Excavations have revealed that many of these artifacts were destroyed or damaged soon after Amenhotep IV's death. Most of these artifacts have been distributed between several museums and private collections around the world. Research into these artifacts continue to this day.

Fragments of granite sarcophagi were recovered from both inside and outside the Royal Tomb. Of these, Amenhotep IV's is the best understood. It was re-constructed from numerous fragments and is displayed at the Egyptian Museum in Cairo. Made of red granite from Aswan, it was 1.255 m (49.4 in) wide and 2.885 m (113.6 in) long. It was rectangular, breaking with the usual cartouche-shape used for royal sarcophagi in the New Kingdom. Its decoration featured the Aten instead of the traditional funerary gods; the protective goddesses on each corner of the box were replaced with figures of Nefertiti. On the sloping lid, whose shape imitated the pr-wr shrine of Upper Egypt, Aten rays reached along its length from the head end.

Amenhotep IV provided his mother Tiye with a similarly decorated Atenist sarcophagus. It was of smaller size, with the box estimated to be 84 cm (33 in) wide and 2.2 m (87 in) long; the lid was a simple arched form. According to Bouriant, Barsanti found smashed pieces of Meketaten's sarcophagus in alpha. Based on their thinness, the fragments seem to have belonged to a small sarcophagus (or possibly another piece of her funerary equipment), consistent with the burial of a child.

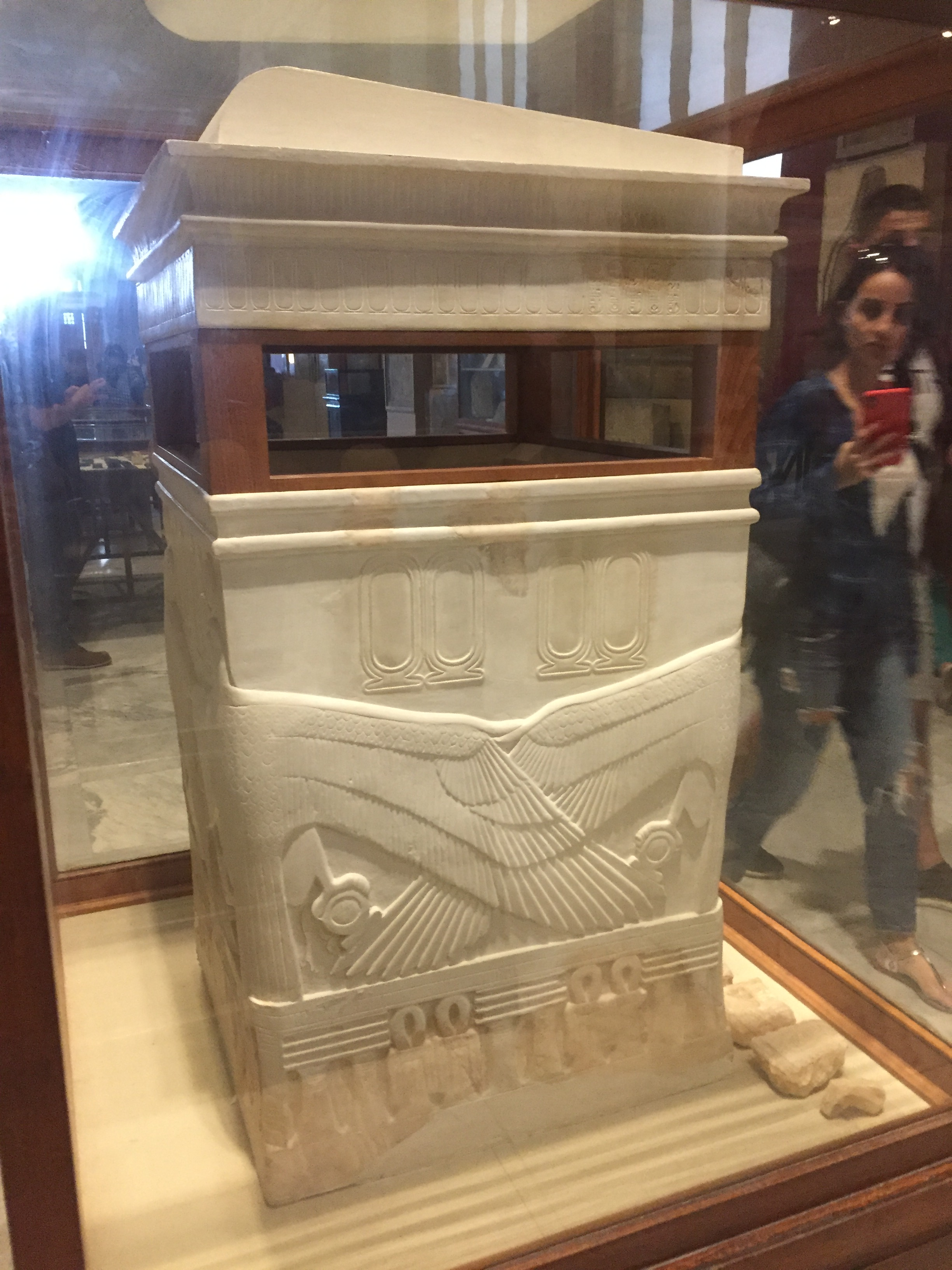
Restored canopic chest of Akhenaten, Egyptian Museum

Despite the change in funerary beliefs, mummification and its associated organ-removal was still carried out. Akhenaten's canopic chest, which housed his embalmed viscera, was made of alabaster, and featured solar falcons with outspread wings on each corner. The texts consisted only of the names of the Aten and presumably those of the king. The lids for each of the compartments inside the chest were traditional in form, being shaped like the head of the king. Instead of the usual nemes-headdress, the khepresh or perhaps a short wig was worn. A novel feature is a pair of falcons spreading their wings protectively around the neck.

Ushabti figures were also included, but were only inscribed with the name and title of the owner.

=== Human remains ===
In 1891, French Egyptologist Georges Daressy stated that the remains of a dismembered mummy were visible near the tomb's entrance. The body was not collected and has since been lost. Tombs were frequently reused over hundreds of years so the body may not necessarily have belonged to a member of the royal family.

== See also ==
- Tombs of the Nobles (Amarna)
- Anonymous Tombs in Amarna
