= Meketaten =

Daughter of Akhenaten and Nefertiti

i t n ra Aa16 D36 V31 t B1
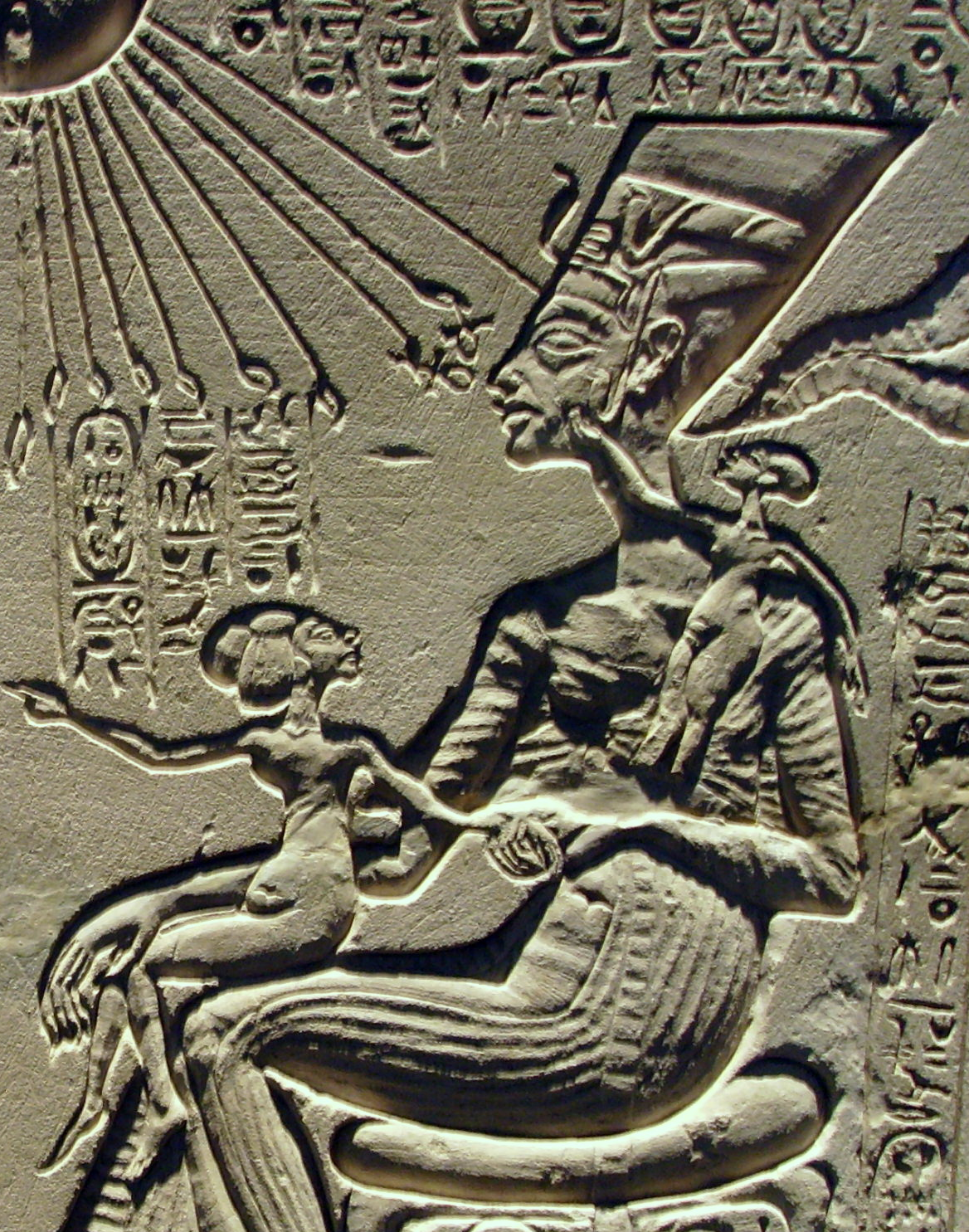
- Meketaten on Nefertiti's lap
- Born: c. 1349 BC
- Died: c. 1339 BC (aged c. 10)
- Parent(s): Amenhotep IV; Nefertiti

Meketaten (Ancient Egyptian: mꜥkt itn, meaning "Behold the Aten" or "Protected by Aten"; c. 1349 BC - c. 1339 BC) was the second of six daughters born to the Egyptian Pharaoh Amenhotep IV and his Great Royal Wife Nefertiti. She likely lived between Year 4 and Year 14 of Amenhotep IV's reign. Although little is known about her, she is frequently depicted with her sisters accompanying her royal parents in the first two-thirds of the Amarna Period.

== Biography ==
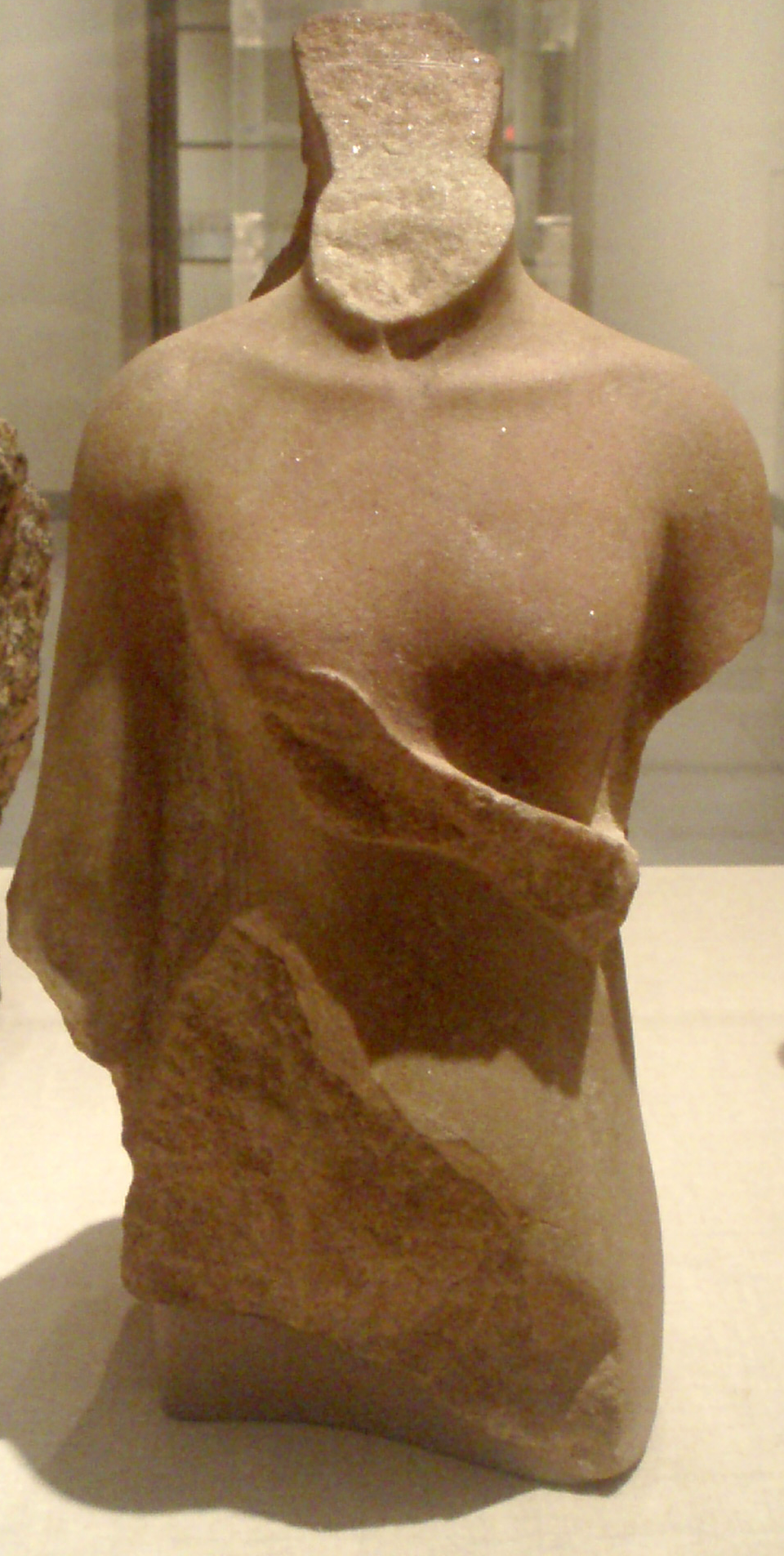
Fragmentary quartzite statue of the Amarna princess Meketaten, from the reign of Amenhotep IV, c. 1352–1336 BC. On display at the Brooklyn Museum. The broken hand over the figure's right breast was common to images depicting young girls, and likely once held a flower or rattle.

Meketaten was born around Year 4 of Amenhotep IV's reign to him and his Great Royal Wife, Nefertiti. She had an elder sister, Meritaten, and four younger sisters: Ankhesenamun, Neferneferuaten Tasherit, Neferneferure, and Setepenre. Tutankhaten was likely their full brother or half-brother through their father.

Her birth year is estimated based on the dates of inscriptions that reference her. The first known depiction of Meketaten is on the walls of the Hwt-benben temple in Thebes, which is dedicated to her mother, Nefertiti. Meketaten additionally appears behind Meritaten in later inscriptions, thought to date to Year 4 or later. Further, her figure was added to a Boundary Stela at Akhetaten that states events from Year 4 and was carved in Year 5.

Meketaten and the royal family moved to Akhetaten, or Amarna, while she was still a small child. The tombs of the Amarnan nobility depict the royal family, including Meketaten, in various scenes of royal life. In Ay's tomb, Meketaten is depicted holding a tray of gifts while wrapping an arm around Nefertiti’s neck. In her father's regnal year 12, Meketaten and her family attended the reception of foreign tributes. This can be seen on several scenes depicted within the private tombs of the official Huya, and High Priest Meryre II.

Other monuments mentioning Meketaten include a stela from Heliopolis, a statue base from the Fayoum, and the tombs of Panehesy and Parennefer.

== Death and burial ==
Meketaten died around Year 14 of Amenhotep IV's reign. She most likely died of a plague along with other members of the royal family. Between Years 12 and 15, many members of the royal family disappear from the record and cease to be mentioned again: Queen Mother Tiye, King's second consort Kiya, and the King's Daughters Neferneferure, Setepenre, and Meketaten.

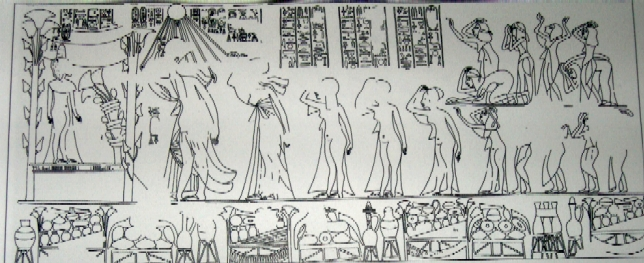
Meketaten under the canopy, on the wall paintings of the Chamber $\gamma$. In front of her: Amenhotep IV, Nefertiti, Meritaten, Ankhesenpaaten, and Neferneferuaten Tasherit.

Meketaten was likely buried in the Royal Tomb at Akhetaten, where fragments of her sarcophagus were found. Inscriptions upon the fragments mention her parents, her sister Ankhesenamun, and her grandparents Amenhotep III and Tiye. While the names in the scene in the chamber denoted $\alpha$ have been hacked out, hieroglyphs in chamber $\gamma$ identify a portrayal of a dead young woman as Meketaten.

In chamber $\gamma$, another scene shows a figure labeled Meketaten standing under a canopy. In front of her, stand Akhenaten, Nefertiti, and their three daughters, Meritaten, Ankhesenpaaten, and Neferneferuaten Tasherit. Several others scenes within the tomb possibly relate to her. In both chambers $\alpha$ and $\gamma$, Akhenaten and Nefertiti bend over a woman's inert body. The pharaoh and his Great Royal Wife weep and grip each other's arms for support. Behind them, a nurse cradles a baby in her arms and is accompanied by a fan-bearer, which indicates the baby's royal status.

== Ancestry ==
Ancestors of Meketaten

Thutmose IV
Amenhotep III
Mutemwiya
Amenhotep IV
Yuya
Tiye
Thuya
Meketaten
Nefertiti
