= Neferneferuaten Tasherit =

Daughter of Akhenaten and Nefertiti

- King's Daughter
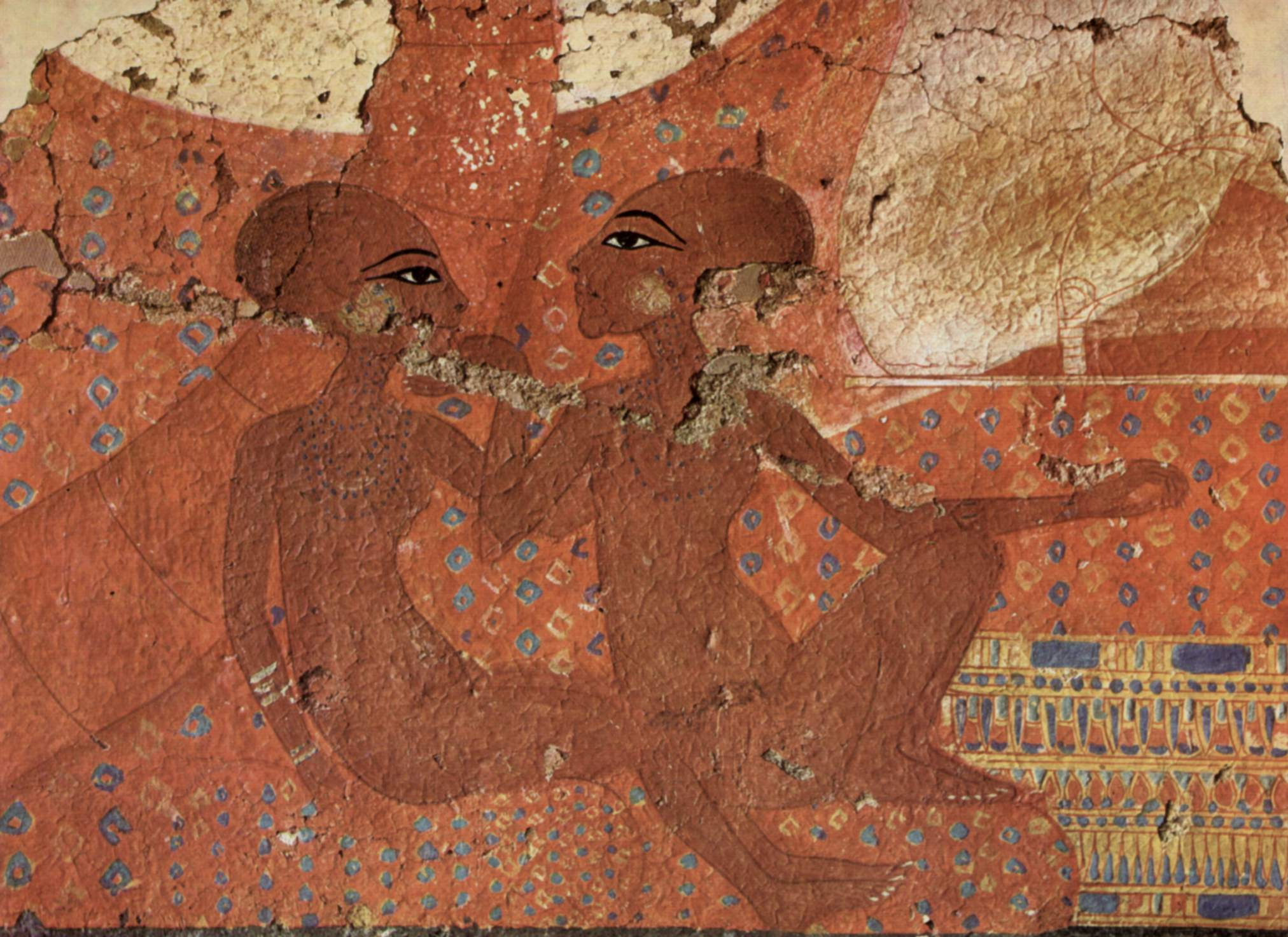
- Neferneferuaten Tasherit (right) and Neferneferure on a wall painting in the King's house
Egyptian name
i t n ra nfr nfr nfr nfr t&A S r t A17
- Dynasty: 18th Dynasty
- Father: Akhenaten
- Mother: Nefertiti

Neferneferuaten Tasherit or Neferneferuaten the younger (Ancient Egyptian: Nfr nfrw Jtn tꜣšrjt, meaning most beautiful one of Aten – younger) (14th century BCE) was an ancient Egyptian princess of the 18th Dynasty and the fourth daughter of Pharaoh Akhenaten and his Great Royal Wife Nefertiti.

== Family ==
Neferneferuaten was born between c. year 8 and 9 of her father's reign. She was the fourth of six known daughters of the royal couple. It is likely that she was born in Akhetaten, the capital founded by her father. Her name Neferneferuaten ("Beauty of the Beauties of Aten" or "Most Beautiful One of Aten") is the exact copy of the name Nefertiti took in the 5th regnal year. ("Ta-sherit" simply means "the younger"). She had three older sisters named Meritaten, Meketaten, and Ankhesenpaaten (later known as Ankhesenamun), and two younger sisters named Neferneferure and Setepenre.

== Life ==
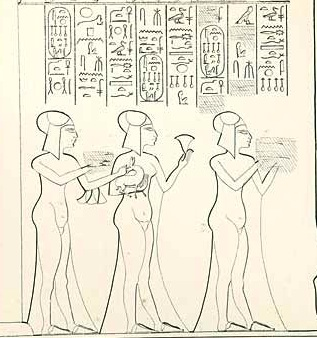
From left to right: Setepenre, Neferneferure, and Neferneferuaten Tasherit at the Durbar in year 12.

One of the earliest depictions of Neferneferuaten Tasherit is on a mural from the King's House in Amarna. She is depicted sitting on a pillow with her sister Neferneferure. The fresco is dated to c. year 9 of Akhenaten, and the entire family is depicted, including the baby Setepenre.

Neferneferuaten Tasherit is depicted in several tombs in Amarna and appears on monuments. A statue base originally from Amarna, but later moved to Heliopolis, mentions the Aten and Akhenaten, while in texts in a lower register the royal daughters Ankhesenpaaten and Neferneferuaten Tasherit are mentioned.

In the tomb of Huya, the chief Steward of Neferneferuaten's grandmother Queen Tiye, Neferneferuaten is shown in a family scene on a lintel on the north wall. The extended scene shows Akhenaten and Nefertiti on the left with their four eldest daughters, while on the right hand side Amenhotep III, Queen Tiye and princess Baketaten are shown. In the reward scene in the tomb of Meryre II, Neferneferuaten Tasherit is shown with four of her sisters (only Setepenre is absent).

She is depicted at the Durbar in year 12 in the tomb of the Overseer of the royal quarters Meryre II in Amarna. Akhenaten and Nefertiti are shown seated in a kiosk, receiving tribute from foreign lands. The daughters of the royal couple are shown standing behind their parents. Neferneferuaten is the first daughter in the lower register. She is holding an object which is too damaged to identify. Her sisters Neferneferure and Setepenre are standing behind her. Neferneferure is shown holding a pet gazelle and Setepenre is shown reaching over to pet the animal.

Neferneferuaten also appears in the award scene of Panehesy. She is shown standing in the building near the window of appearance as her parents, Akhenaten and Nefertiti, bestow honors upon the first servant of the Aten named Panehesy. In another scene in this tomb Neferneferuaten and her three older sisters all accompany their parents who are shown offering flowers to the Aten. The four royal daughters are all shown holding bouquets of flowers.

Neferneferuaten Tasherit is shown with her sisters Meritaten and Ankhesenpaaten mourning the death of Meketaten in c. year 14 in the Royal Tomb in Amarna. Her younger sisters Neferneferure and Setepenre are not present in this scene.

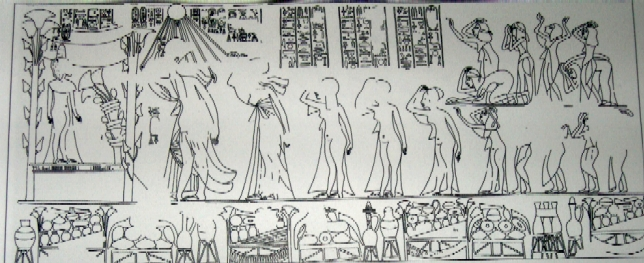
Meketaten under the canopy, on the wall paintings of the Chamber $\gamma$. In front of her: Akhenaten, Nefertiti, Meritaten, Ankhesenpaaten and Neferneferuaten Tasherit.

== Final years and death ==
It is unknown what became of Neferneferuaten Tasherit, but it has been suggested she died before Tutankhamun and Ankhesenpaaten came to the throne. It is possible she was one of the persons buried in chamber $\alpha$ in the Royal Tomb in Amarna.

It was previously suggested by James Allen in 2009 that she might be identified as Akhenaten's co-regent. whose exact identity is still disputed, but who could have been a woman.

However, in an updated 2016 article, James Allen has now repudiated his previous opinion that Neferneferuaten-tasherit was the female pharaoh Neferneferuaten. Allen now agrees that this female king was indeed Nefertiti instead with the publication of the Year 16 date showing that Nefertiti was still alive in Akhenaten's second last year of rule. Other women who have been suggested as candidates for the identity of this female ruler are Queen Nefertiti (her mother) and her older sister Meritaten.
