= Ankhesenpaaten Tasherit =

Ancient Egyptian princess

Egyptian name
M17 X1 N35 N5 S34 S29 N35 G40 B1 t&A S r t A17
- Dynasty: 18th Dynasty
- Father: Akhenaten or Smenkhkare
- Mother: Ankhesenpaaten, Kiya, or Meritaten

Ankhesenpaaten Tasherit (or Ankhesenpaaten-ta-sherit, "Ankhesenpaaten the Younger") was an ancient Egyptian princess of the 18th Dynasty. Ankhesenpaaten Tasherit and another princess, Meritaten Tasherit are two princesses who appear in scenes dating to the later part of the reign of Akhenaten. The titles of at least one of the princess is of the form "[...-ta]sherit, born of [...], born of the King's Great Wife [...]. The inscription is damaged and the name of the mother and grandmother of the princesses has not been preserved. Ankhesenpaaten Tasherit has been known to archaeologists since 1938, when a talatat block with her picture and name was found in Hermopolis.

Ankhesenpaaten Tasherit's fate is uncertain. The mention of the god Aten in her name suggests that she was indeed a daughter of Akhenaten, since his successors reverted his religious reforms, and reverted to the worship of Egypt's traditional gods. The name Aten was dropped from popular use during this time.

== Proposed parents ==
Several different sets of parents have been proposed for Ankhesenpaaten Tasherit (as well as Meritaten Tasherit).

=== Ankhesenpaaten and Akhenaten ===
She is most commonly held to have been the daughter of Ankhesenpaaten (a daughter of Pharaoh Akhenaten) and Akhenaten himself. The title of the princess is thought to have been "Ankhesenpaaten-tasherit, born of Ankhesenpaaten, born of the King's Great Wife Nefertiti". If we assume that Ankhesenpaaten Tasherit was the daughter of Ankhesenpaaten and Akhenaten, she must have been born towards the very end of Akhenaten's reign. Since Ankhesenpaaten was born around the 5th year of her father's reign, the earliest year she could have had a child was around Year 16 of his reign.

=== Kiya and Akhenaten ===
Since both Ankhesenpaaten Tasherit and another princess, Meritaten Tasherit appear only in texts that once mentioned Akhenaten's second wife Kiya, it is also possible that they were children of Akhenaten and Kiya, or that they were fictional, replacing the name of Kiya's daughter, who might have been Beketaten, more commonly thought to be Tiye's child.

=== Meritaten and Smenkhare ===
Dodson proposed Ankhesenpaaten Tasherit was a daughter of the young royal couple Meritaten and Smenkhare. The young princess would have been named after Meritaten's sister.
