= Setepenre (princess) =

Daughter of Akhenaten and Nefertiti

N5 U21 Q3 N35 B1
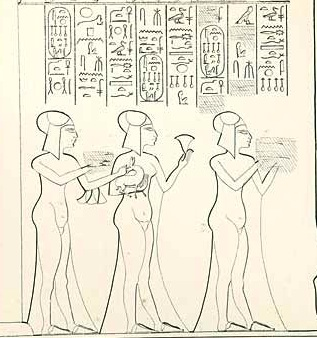
- From left to right: Setepenre, Neferneferure, and Neferneferuaten Tasherit at the Durbar around 1341 BC
- Born: c. 1343 BC
- Died: c. 1340 BC (aged c. 3)
- Parent(s): Amenhotep IV; Nefertiti

Setepenre or Sotepenre (Ancient Egyptian: stp-n-rꜥ "chosen of Re"; c. 1343 BC - c. 1340 BC) was an ancient Egyptian princess of the 18th Dynasty; sixth and last daughter of Pharaoh Amenhotep IV and his chief queen Nefertiti.

== Family ==
Setepenre was born around the 9th to 11th year of her father Amenhotep IV in the city of Akhetaten. She had five older sisters named Meritaten, Meketaten, Ankhesenamun, Neferneferuaten, and Neferneferure.

== Life ==
One of the earliest depictions of Setepenre is in a fresco from the King's House in Amarna. She is depicted sitting on her mother Nefertiti's lap. The fresco is much damaged and only a small hand of Setepenre remains. The fresco is dated to around year 9 of Amenhotep IV, and the entire family is depicted.

The next time the six princesses appeared together was in Year 12, on the eighth day of the second month of winter, during the so-called "reception of foreign tributes". This event was depicted in the Amarna tombs of Meryre II and Huya. In the tomb of Meryre II, Amenhotep IV and Nefertiti are shown seated in a kiosk, receiving tribute from foreign lands. The daughters of the royal couple are shown standing behind their parents. Setepenre is the last daughter in the lower register. She is standing right behind her sister Neferneferure, who is holding a gazelle. Setepenre is shown reaching over to pet the gazelle.

== Death and burial ==
On Wall C in Room $\alpha$ of the Royal Tomb of Akhenaten the names of five princesses are listed, that of Neferneferure is plastered over and only four of the princesses are depicted. This probably means that Setepenre predeceased Neferneferure, and it is likely that Setepenre died around Year 13 or 14, before she reached her sixth birthday. Since she is not shown on Wall B in Room $\gamma$, where the royal family mourns the death of the second princess Meketaten, it is likely that she predeceased Meketaten as well, perhaps before the construction of the royal tomb was advanced enough to allow burial. She was possibly the first of the princesses to die. It is possible that her body was later moved to Room $\alpha$ of the Royal Tomb.

== Ancestry ==
Ancestors of Setepenre (princess)

Thutmose IV
Amenhotep III
Mutemwiya
Amenhotep IV
Yuya
Tiye
Thuya
Setepenre
Nefertiti
