= Meritaten =

i t n ra N36 t B1
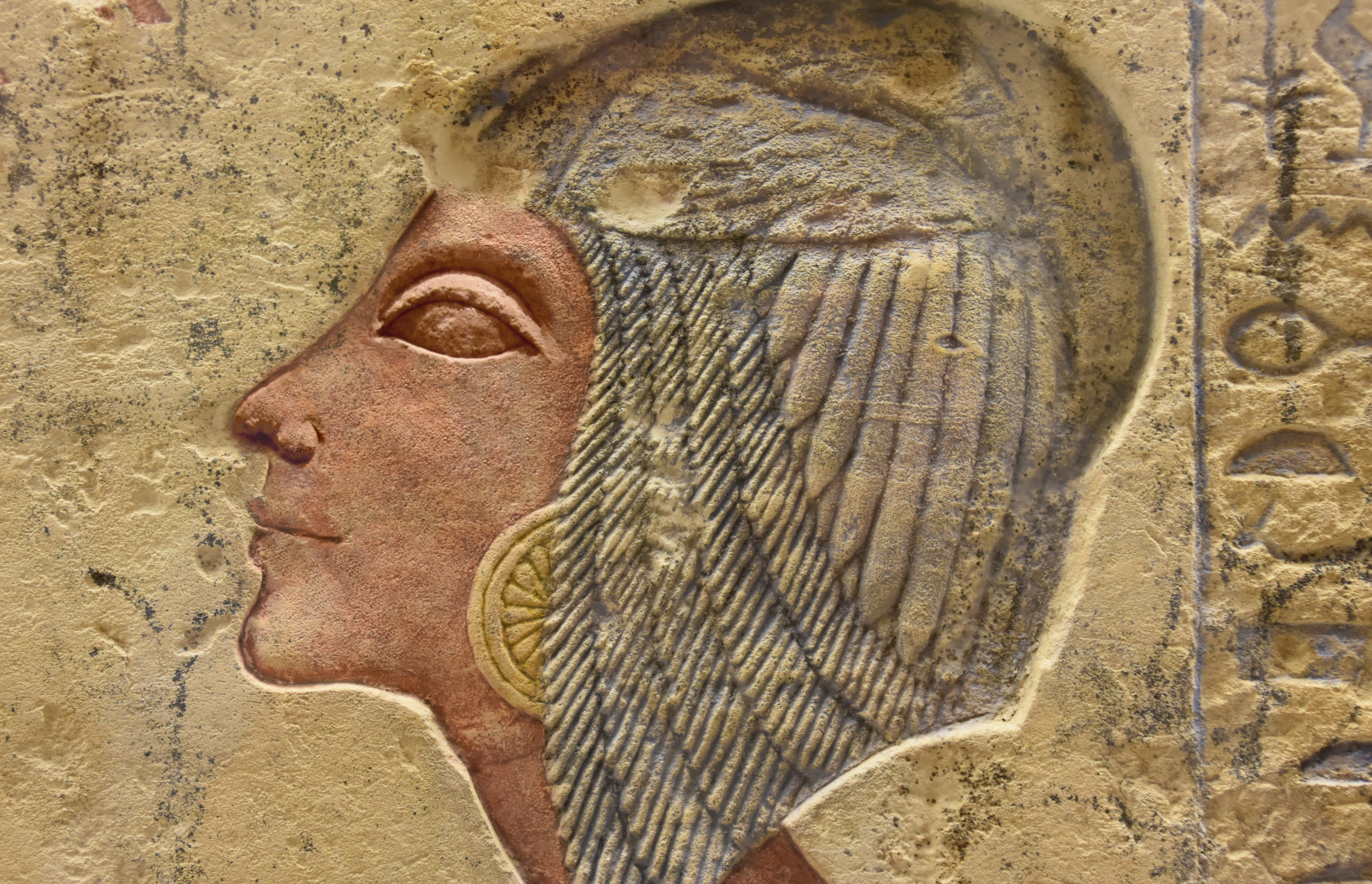
- Restored portrait of Meritaten

Queen consort of Egypt
- Tenure: c. 1335 - c. 1334 BC
- Pharaoh: Smenkhkare
- Born: c. 1350 BC
- Died: c. 1330 BC (aged c. 20)
- Spouse: Smenkhkare
- Dynasty: 18th Dynasty of Egypt
- Father: Amenhotep IV
- Mother: Nefertiti
- Religion: Atenism

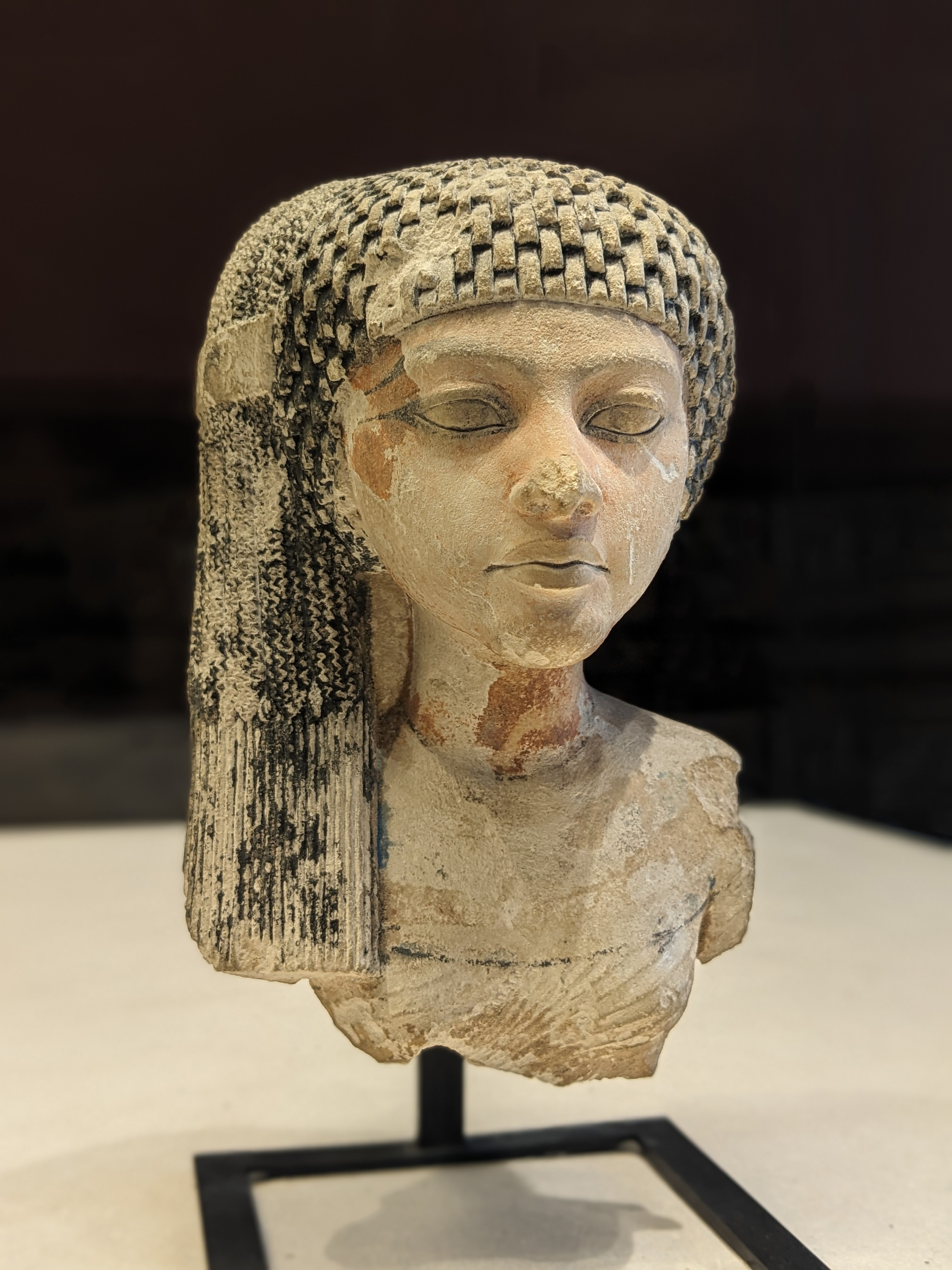
Bust of a daughter of Amenhotep IV and Nefertiti, perhaps the young Meritaten, in the Louvre, Paris

Meritaten, also spelled Merytaten, Meritaton or Meryetaten (Ancient Egyptian: mrii.t-itn; c. 1350 BC - c. 1330 BC) was an ancient Egyptian royal woman of the 18th Dynasty of Egypt. Her name means "She who is beloved of Aten"; Aten being the sun-deity whom her father, Pharaoh Akhenaten, worshipped. She held several titles, performing official roles for her father and becoming the Great Royal Wife to Pharaoh Smenkhkare, who may have been a brother or son of Akhenaten. Meritaten has been theorized to be identical with female Pharaoh Ankhkheperure Neferneferuaten, however inscription on the box found in Tutankhaten's tomb seemingly presents the two as different individuals.

== Family ==
Meritaten was the first of six daughters born to Pharaoh Amenhotep IV and his Great Royal Wife Nefertiti. Her sisters are Meketaten, Ankhesenamun, Neferneferuaten Tasherit, Neferneferure, and Setepenre. Meritaten is mentioned in diplomatic letters, by the name Mayati. She is mentioned in a letter from Abimilki of Tyre. The reference usually is thought to date to the period when Meritaten's position at court became more important, during the latter part of the reign of Amenhotep IV. It is possible, however, that the letter refers to the birth of Meritaten.

She was married to Amenhotep IV's successor, Pharaoh Smenkhkare.

Inscriptions mention a young princess named Meritaten Tasherit, who may be the daughter of Meritaten and Smenkhkare. Inscriptions from Ashmunein suggest that Meritaten-tasherit is the daughter of Meritaten. The scene dates to the reign of Amenhotep IV, and this means the father of the young princess could be Amenhotep IV. If so, this means Amenhotep IV took his own daughters as wives. Another princess named Ankhesenpaaten Tasherit had been suggested as an additional daughter of Meritaten, but it is more likely that she is a daughter of Ankhesenpaaten.

Additionally, Meritaten is speculated to be mother of Tutankhaten, either by Smenkhkare, or by her own father Amenhotep IV.

== Biography ==
=== Early years in Thebes ===
Meritaten was most likely born in Thebes, early in her father's marriage to Nefertiti, perhaps before he assumed the throne, as she is shown officiating during year five of his reign. The royal family first lived in Thebes and the royal palace may have been part of the Temple Complex of Akhenaten at Karnak. The exact use of the buildings in Karnak is not known, but the scenes decorating the Teni-menu suggest it may have served as a residence. Meritaten is depicted beside her mother Nefertiti in reliefs carved into the Hut-Benben. The Hut-Benben was a structure associated with Nefertiti, who is the main officiant in the scenes, the great royal wife being the highest priestess. Meritaten appears behind her mother shaking a sistrum. Her younger sisters Meketaten and Ankhesenamun also appear in some of the scenes, but not so often as Meritaten.

=== Amarna princess ===
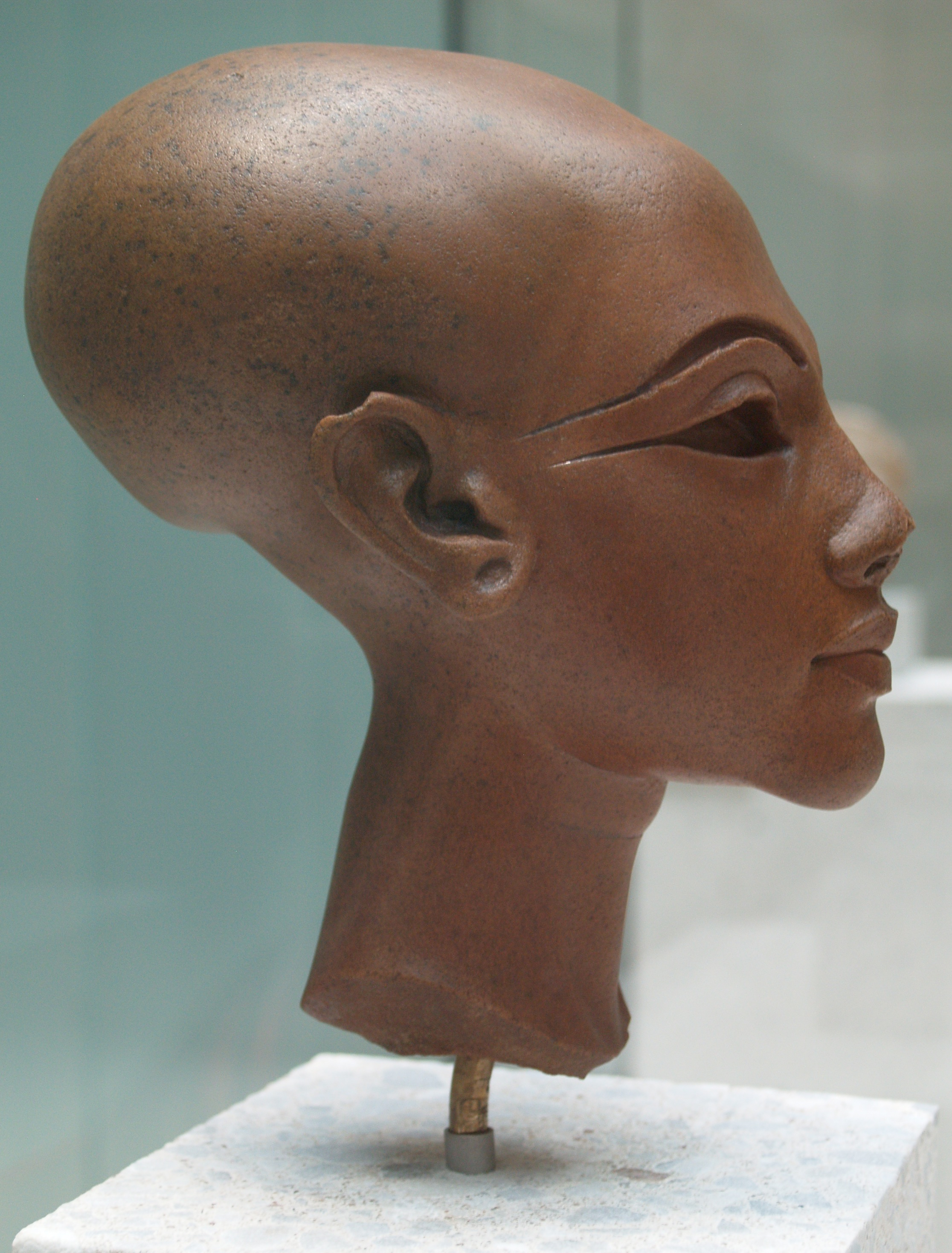
Amarna Princess - Museum in Berlin

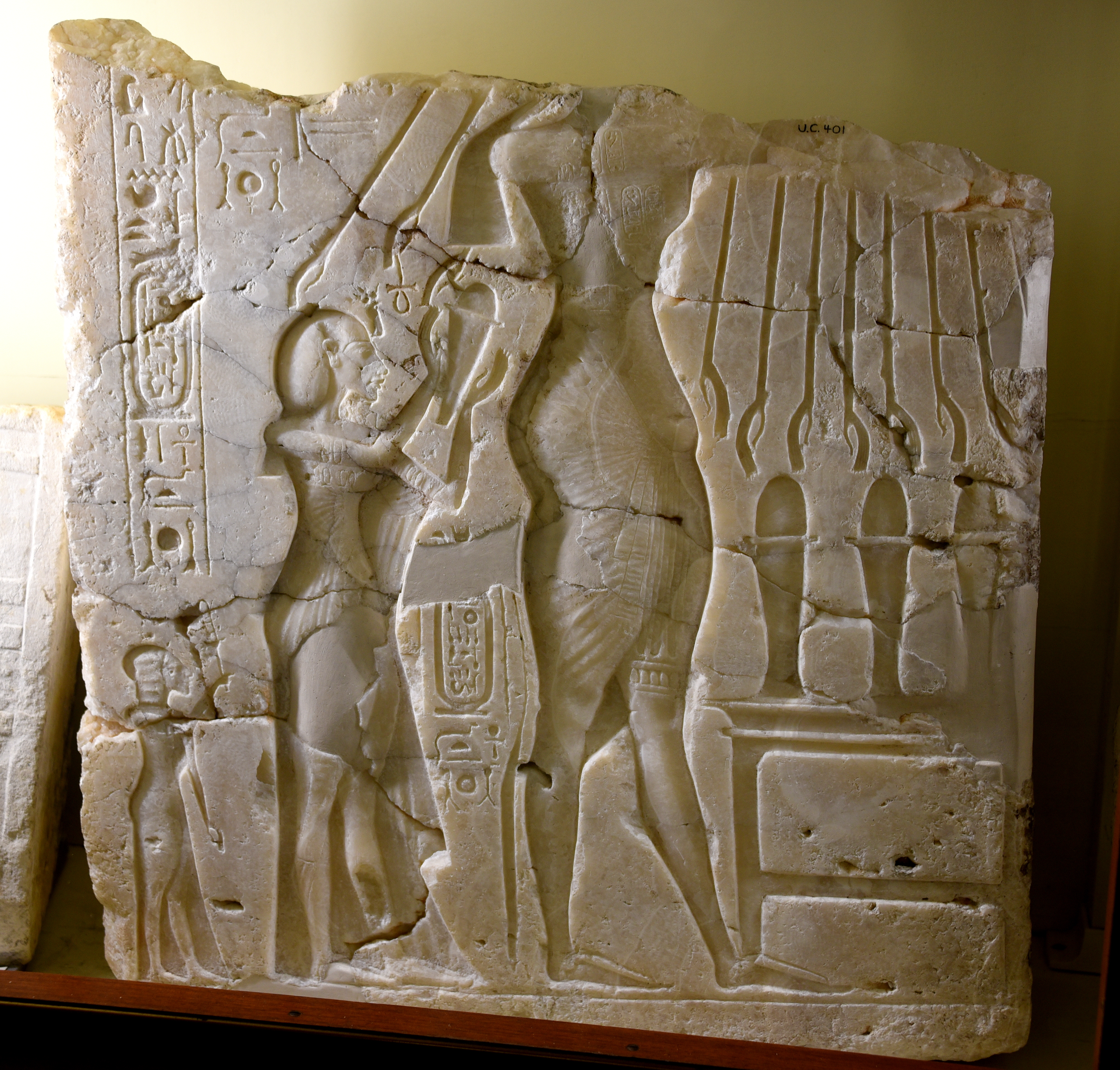
Alabaster sunken relief depicting Akhenaten, Nefertiti, and daughter Meritaten, with early Aten cartouches on king's arm and chest, from Amarna, Egypt, Eighteenth Dynasty, The Petrie Museum of Egyptian Archaeology, London

In year five of her father Amenhotep IV's reign, Meritaten appears on the boundary stelae designating the boundaries of the new capital to which her father moved the royal family and his administrators. During Amenhotep IV's reign, she was the most frequently depicted and mentioned of the six daughters. Her figure appears on paintings in temples, tombs, and private chapels. Not only is she shown among images showing the family life of the pharaoh, which were typical of the Amarna Period, but on those depicting official ceremonies, as well.

The two structures most associated with Meritaten at Amarna are the Northern Palace and the Maru-Aten. The Maru-Aten was located to the south of the city limits of Amarna. The structure consisted of two enclosures containing pools or lakes and pavilions set in an area planted with trees. An artificial island contained a pillared construction that held a painted pavement showing scenes from nature.

Meritaten's name seems to replace that of another royal lady in several places, among them in the Northern Palace and in the Maru-Aten. This had been misinterpreted as evidence of Nefertiti's disgrace and banishment from the royal court but, more recently, the erased inscriptions turned out to be the name of Kiya, one of Akhenaten's secondary wives, disproving that interpretation.

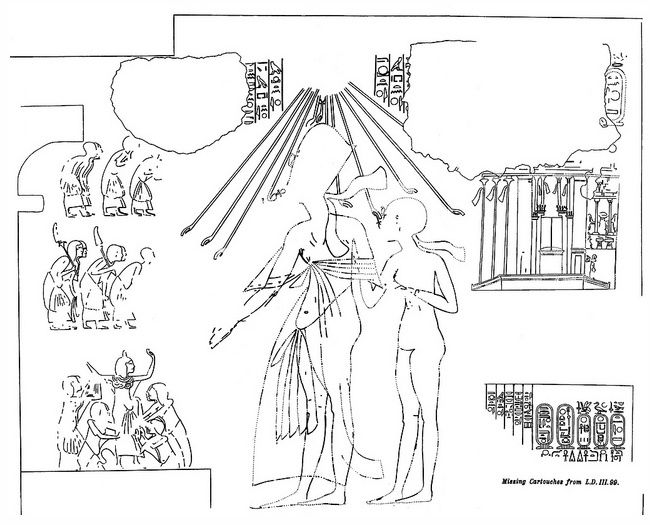
Smenkhare and Meritaten shown in the tomb of Meryre II

=== Great Royal Wife ===
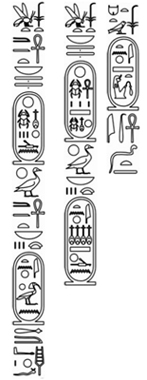
Inscription mentioning Akhenaten, Neferneferuaten, and Meritaten, from the tomb of Tutankhamen

At some point, Meritaten married Smenkhkare and became his Great Royal Wife. She is depicted with him in the tomb of Meryre II, bestowing honors and gifts upon Meryre. The chronology of the final years of the Amarna Period is unclear, however Smenkhkare is believed to have served as a co-regent to Amenhotep IV. Meritaten was the Great Royal Wife to Smenkhkare, while Nefertiti continued as the Great Royal Wife of Amenhotep IV. Nefertiti still held the Great Royal Wife title in year 16, hence Smenkhkare must have been a co-regent at that time, or otherwise ruled with his wife Meritaten sometime after year 16 of Amenhotep IV.

Meritaten is mentioned on gold daisies that decorated a garment found in Tutankhamen's tomb. She also is mentioned on a wooden box meant to contain linen garments. The box mentions two kings: Neferkheperure-Waenre (Akhenaten) and Ankhkheperure-mr-waenre, Neferneferuaten-mr-waenre and the Great Royal Wife Meritaten.

According to some scholars, such as J.P. Allen, Ankhkheperure Smenkhkare ruled together with Meritaten, but in the year following Akhenaten's death, Smenkhkare died. The theory is, that Meritaten was the 'king's daughter' Akenkeres who is recorded in Manetho's Epitome to have assumed the throne next, in her own right as king and bearing the name Neferneferuaten. Neferneferuaten is assigned a reign of two years and one month and is placed in Manetho's account as the immediate predecessor of the king, Rathothis, who is believed to be Tutankhamun, her half-brother by another, unnamed wife of Akhenaten.

However, mentioned above inscription on the wooden box from Tutankhaten's tomb appears to treat Neferneferuaten and Meritaten as two different individuals, hence making unlikely the latter was the same person Neferneferuaten.

Archaeologist Alain Zivie asserts that Meritaten also became a foster mother to Tutankhaten, referred to as Maia in some ancient records. Zivie noted that Thutmose, the sculptor appointed vizier by Amenhotep IV and who was found to be the creator of the famous bust of Nefertiti also created one of Maïa (Bubasteion I.20), the foster mother of Tutankhamun and who, in fact, was "Merytaten, the elder daughter of Akhenaten", "who sat briefly on the throne".

== Death and burial ==
The texts of a boundary stele mention that Meritaten was meant to be buried at Akhet-Aten (modern Amarna).

Let a tomb be made for me in the eastern mountain of Akhetaten. Let my burial be made in it, in the millions of jubilees which the Aten, my father, has decreed for me. Let the burial of the Great King's Wife, Nefertiti, be made in it, in the millions of years which the Aten, my father, decreed for her. Let the burial of the King's Daughter, Meritaten, [be made] in it, in these millions of years.

The royal tomb in Amarna was used for the burial of Meketaten, Tiye, and Amenhotep IV, and likely was closed after the death and burial of Amenhotep IV. After that, Meritaten's burial may have been planned for one of the other royal tombs in Amarna.

=== Possible mummy ===
A female mummy found in KV35 nicknamed the "Younger Lady" was proposed to be Meritaten. DNA tests seemingly identify the individual as daughter of Amenhotep III and Tiye, sister of a man found in KV55 (presumed to be Amenhotep IV) and mother of Tutankhaten. However, interpretation of those data have been called into questions, as inbreeding within royal family could potentially make it hard to determine the exact genetic relationship between individuals, and there is also no evidence of Akhenaten marrying his sister. Joyce Tyldesley speculates that the KV55 mummy and the Younger Lady are indeed descendants of Amenhotep III and Tiye but as grandchildren (rather than children) and suggests they are Smenkhkare and Meritaten (whom she believes to be full-siblings as offspring of Akhenaten and Nefertiti). She does, however, consider them more likely to be Tutankhamun's half-siblings than his parents (proposed by her to be Akhenaten and Kiya). On other hand, Kara Cooney argues that instead of being child of two siblings, Tutankhamun was result of father-daughter relationship, and his mother should be identified either as Meketaten or Meritaten.

Based on current knowledge regarding genetic alleles of Younger Lady and her family members, Juan Antonio Belmonte points out that while it is technically possible she was Meritaten/granddaughter of Amenhotep III and Tiye, it is not very likely:

While it is true that genetically speaking Lady KV35YL may be a daughter of Akhenaten and Nefertiti, this will oblige that she would have inherited all paternal alleles of each of the haplotypes only from her grandfather Amenhotep III and none from her grandmother Tiyi; a possibility of one vs. eight. It should be added that Nefertiti should have passed to her daughter all her alleles inherited from Yuya and Tuya, which would confirm her as their granddaughter, but none of her other genetic pole. This seems again unlikely. In fact, when most of the variables are taken into account, the probability that both things happen at the same time is smaller than 6%, which does not invalidate the hypothesis but makes it very improbable.
Therefore, it is still better to assume that Lady KV35YL is a young daughter of Amenhotep III and Tiyi (...).

== Ancestry ==
Ancestors of Meritaten

Thutmose IV
Amenhotep III
Mutemwiya
Amenhotep IV
Yuya
Tiye
Thuya
Meritaten
Nefertiti
