= Neferneferure =

Daughter of Akhenaten and Nefertiti

N5 F35 F35 F35 F35 B1
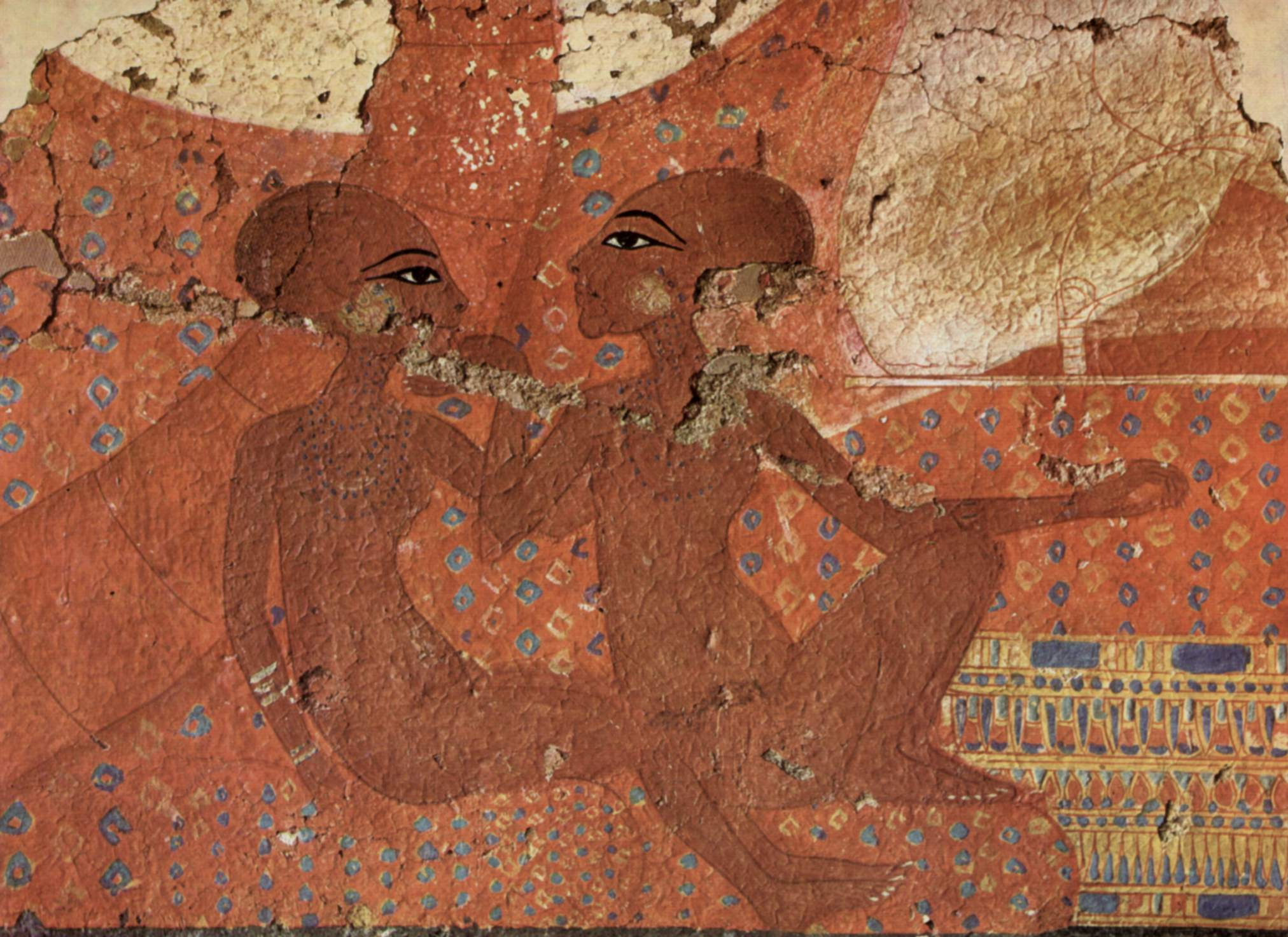
- Neferneferure (left) and her elder sister Neferneferuaten Tasherit on a wall painting in the King's House at Amarna
- Born: c. 1343 BC
- Died: c. 1340 BC (aged c. 3)
- Parent(s): Amenhotep IV; Nefertiti

Neferneferure (Ancient Egyptian: nfr-nfr.w-rꜥ "beautiful are the beauties of Re"; c. 1343 BC - c. 1340 BC) was an ancient Egyptian princess of the 18th Dynasty. She was the fifth of six known daughters of Pharaoh Amenhotep IV and his Great Royal Wife Nefertiti.

== Family ==
Neferneferure was born during the 8th or 9th regnal year of her father Amenhotep IV in the city of Amarna. She had four older sisters named Meritaten, Meketaten, Ankhesenamun, and Neferneferuaten Tasherit, as well as a younger sister named Setepenre.

== Life ==
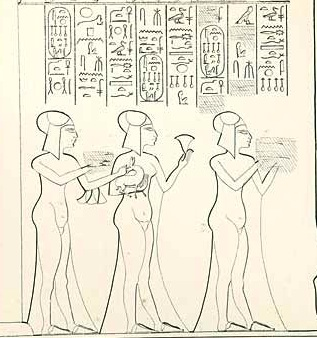
From left to right: Setepenre, Neferneferure, and Neferneferuaten Tasherit at the Durbar in year 12

One of the earliest depictions of Neferneferure is in a fresco from the King's House in Amarna. She is depicted sitting on a pillow with her sister Neferneferuaten Tasherit. The fresco is dated to around year 9 of Amenhotep IV, and the entire family is depicted, including the baby Setepenre.

Neferneferure is depicted at the Durbar in year 12 in the tomb of the Overseer of the royal quarters Meryre II in Amarna. Amenhotep IV and Nefertiti are shown seated in a kiosk, receiving tribute from foreign lands. The daughters of the royal couple are shown standing behind their parents. Neferure is the middle daughter in the lower register. She is holding a gazelle in her right arm and a lotus flower in her left. She is standing right behind her sister Neferneferuaten Tasherit. Her sister Setepenre is standing behind her and is shown reaching over to pet the gazelle.

== Death and burial ==
Neferneferure probably died in the 13th or 14th regnal year, possibly in the plague that swept across Egypt during this time. She is absent from one scene and her name was plastered over in another scene in the Royal Tomb in Amarna. To be specific, on Wall C of the chamber $\alpha$ of the Royal Tomb her name was mentioned among the five princesses (the list excluded the youngest, Setepenre, who was possibly dead by this time), but was later covered by plaster. This suggests that she died after decoration of these chambers was initially finished, and that her name and figure were later plastered over to reflect her death. On Wall B of the chamber $\gamma$ she is missing from the scene which shows her parents and three elder sisters – Meritaten, Ankhesenpaaten, and Neferneferuaten Tasherit – mourning the dead second princess, Meketaten. This suggests that she is likely to have died shortly before the decoration of Wall C of the chamber was finished, and thus was not added. It is possible that Neferneferure was actually buried in chamber $\alpha$ of the royal tomb.

Alternatively she may have been buried in Tomb 29 in Amarna. This theory is based on an amphora handle bearing an inscription mentioning the inner (burial) chamber of Neferneferure. If Neferneferure was buried in tomb 29, then this may mean the Royal Tomb was already sealed at the time of her burial and that she may have died after the death of her father Amenhotep IV.

== Other objects mentioning Neferneferure ==
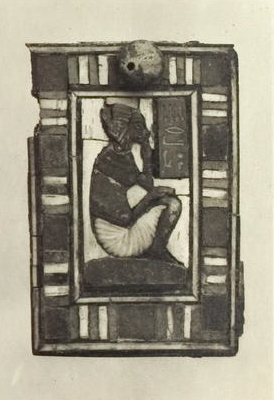
The box lid depicting Neferneferure with her name

A lid of a small box (JdE 61498) bearing her picture was found among the treasures of Tutankhamun. It shows the princess crouching, with a finger pressed to her mouth, as very young children were often depicted. On the lid Re's name in her name was written phonetically instead of with the usual circled dot.

== Ancestry ==
Ancestors of Neferneferure

Thutmose IV
Amenhotep III
Mutemwiya
Amenhotep IV
Yuya
Tiye
Thuya
Neferneferure
Nefertiti
