= Ankhesenamun =

Royal Wife of Tutankhamun

- Great Royal Wife
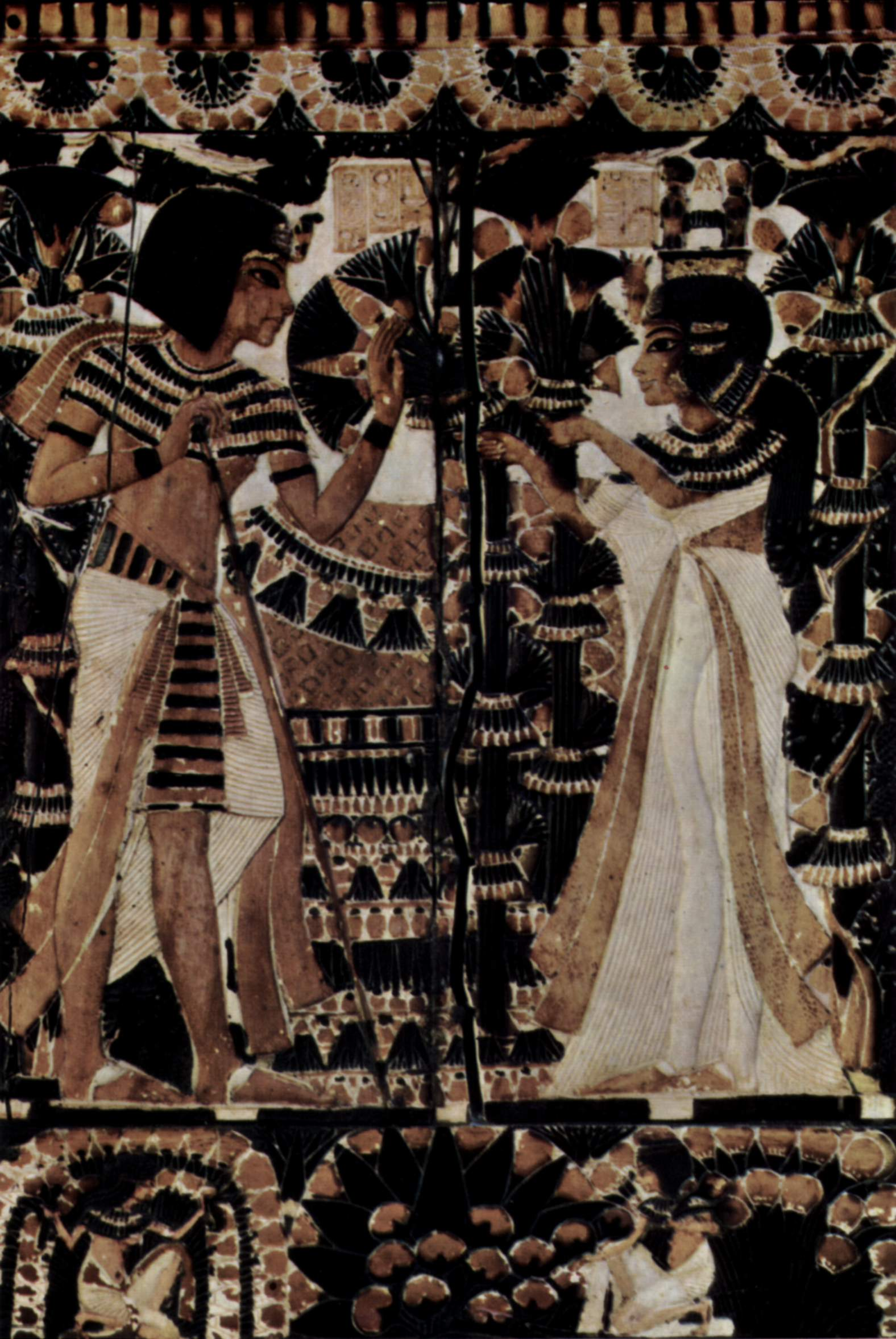
- Ankhesenamun gives flowers to Tutankhamun on the lid of an inlaid box from his tomb. Two children at bottom are either their offspring or the couple's symbolic representation.

Queen consort of Egypt
- Tenure: c. 1331–1323 BC
- Born: 1348/1342 BC BC; Thebes
- Died: After 1322 BC
- Burial: KV21 (uncertain)
- Spouse: Tutankhamun (widowed); Ay
- Issue Detail: 317a and 317b (uncertain); Ankhesenpaaten Tasherit (uncertain)
Egyptian name
M17 mn N35 S34 S29 N35 B1
- Dynasty: 18th of Egypt
- Father: Akhenaten
- Mother: Nefertiti
- Religion: Atenism; Ancient Egyptian religion

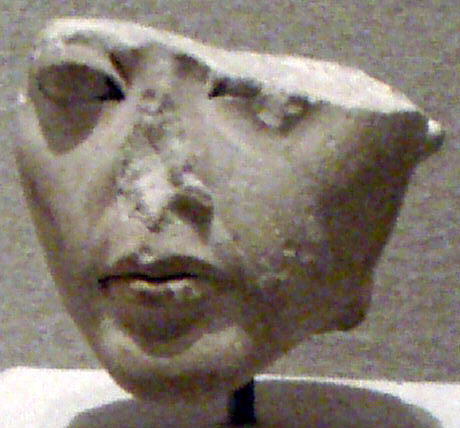
Sculpture fragment believed to be of Ankhesenamun, Brooklyn Museum, United States

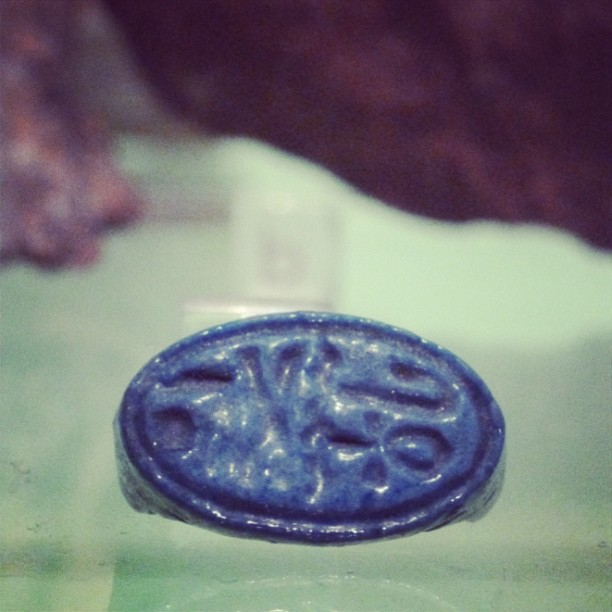
Ring Bezel, with the name of Princess Ankhesenpaaten

Ankhesenamun (ˁnḫ-s-n-imn, "Her Life Is of Amun"; c. 1348 BCE or c. 1342 BCE – after 1322 BCE) was an ancient Egyptian queen who lived during the 18th Dynasty of Egypt. Born Ankhesenpaaten (ˁnḫ.s-n-pꜣ-itn, "she lives for the Aten"), she was the third of six known daughters of the Egyptian Pharaoh Akhenaten and his Great Royal Wife Nefertiti. She became the Great Royal Wife of Tutankhamun. The change in her name reflects the changes in ancient Egyptian religion during her lifetime after her father's death. Her youth is well documented in the ancient reliefs and paintings of the reign of her parents.

Ankhesenamun's activity as the Great Royal Wife of Pharaoh Tutankhamun is not well documented. Initially, she may have been married to her father and it is possible that, upon the death of Tutankhamun, she was married briefly to Tutankhamun's successor, Ay, who is believed by some to be her maternal grandfather.

DNA test results on mummies discovered in KV21 were released in February 2010, which has given rise to speculation that one of two late 18th Dynasty queens buried in that tomb could be Ankhesenamun. Because of their DNA, both mummies are thought to be members of that ruling house.

== Early life ==
Ankhesenpaaten in hieroglyphs
M17 X1 N35 N5 S34 S29 N35 G40 B1
ˁnḫ.s-n-pꜣ-itn
Living for Aten

Ankhesenpaaten was born in a time when Egypt was in the midst of an unprecedented religious revolution (c. 1348 BC). Her parents had abandoned the principal worship of old deities of Egypt in favor of the Aten, hitherto a minor aspect of the sun-god, characterised as the sun's disc.

She is believed to have been born in Thebes, around year 4 of her father's reign, but probably grew up in the city of Akhetaten (present-day Amarna), established as the new capital of the kingdom by her parents. She, along with her two older sisters – Meritaten and Meketaten – became the "senior princesses" and participated in many functions of the government and religion alongside their parents.

== Later life ==
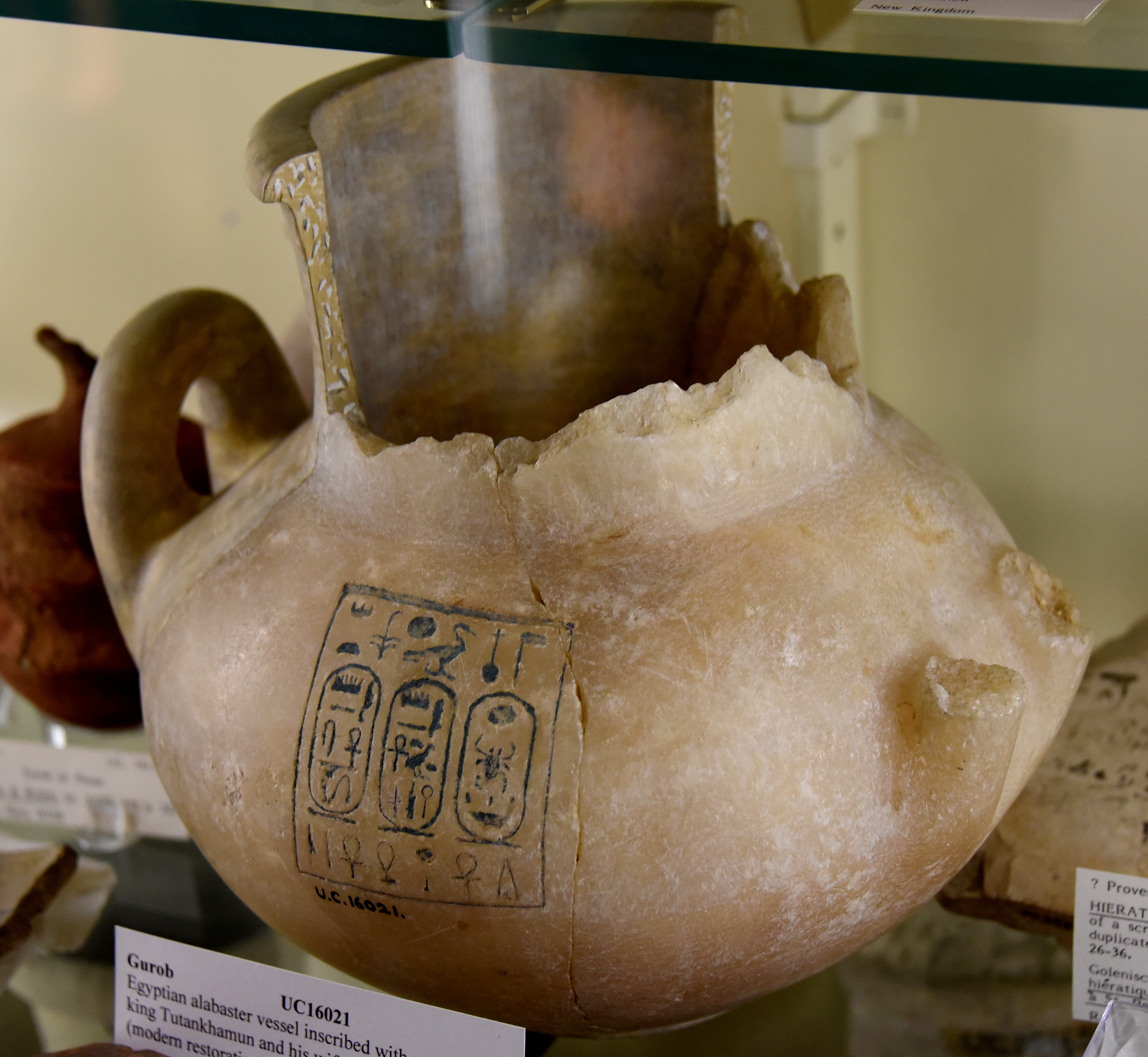
Partially restored alabaster jar with two handles, bearing the cartouches of Tutankhamun and Ankhesenamun, 18th Dynasty, from Gurob, Fayum, Egypt, the Petrie Museum of Egyptian Archaeology, London

Because some inscriptions record the existence of Ankhesenpaaten Tasherit, it has been suggested that Ankhesenamun may have married her own father and had children with him. However, father–daughter marriages were extremely rare in the Egyptian royal family and were often interpreted as ceremonial unions. She was never referred to as her father’s wife. Moreover, Ankhesenpaaten Tasherit is only attested in a very specific context—namely, during the usurpation of Kiya’s monuments—suggesting that she may have been a fictional creation designed to minimize alterations to the inscriptions.

After her father's death and the short reigns of Smenkhkare and Neferneferuaten, she became the wife of Tutankhamun. Following their marriage, the couple honored the deities of the restored religion by changing their names to Tutankhamun and Ankhesenamun. Although Tutankhamun had himself deified during his reign, there's no surviving evidence to show that he concurrently deified Ankhesenamun alongside him.

The couple appear to have had two daughters who died at or soon after birth, and were later buried in their father's tomb; as Tutankhamun's only known wife, Ankhesenamun is presumed to be the two princesses's mother. Two other children, a boy and a girl, are depicted alongside Tutankhamun and Ankhesenamun on an ivory box. They were proposed to be either representation of the royal couple or the pair's otherwise unknown offspring.

After about one decade of his reign, around the age of 18, Tutankhamun died suddenly, leaving Ankhesenamun alone and without an heir at about the age of 21.

A blue glass ring of unknown provenance obtained in 1931 depicts the prenomen of Ay and the name of Ankhesenamun enclosed in cartouches. This indicates that Ankhesenamun married Ay shortly before she disappeared from history, although no monuments show her as great royal wife to him. On the walls of Ay's tomb it is Tey (Ay's senior wife), not Ankhesenamun, who appears as his great royal wife. She probably died during or shortly after his reign and no burial has been found for her yet.

== Hittite letters ==
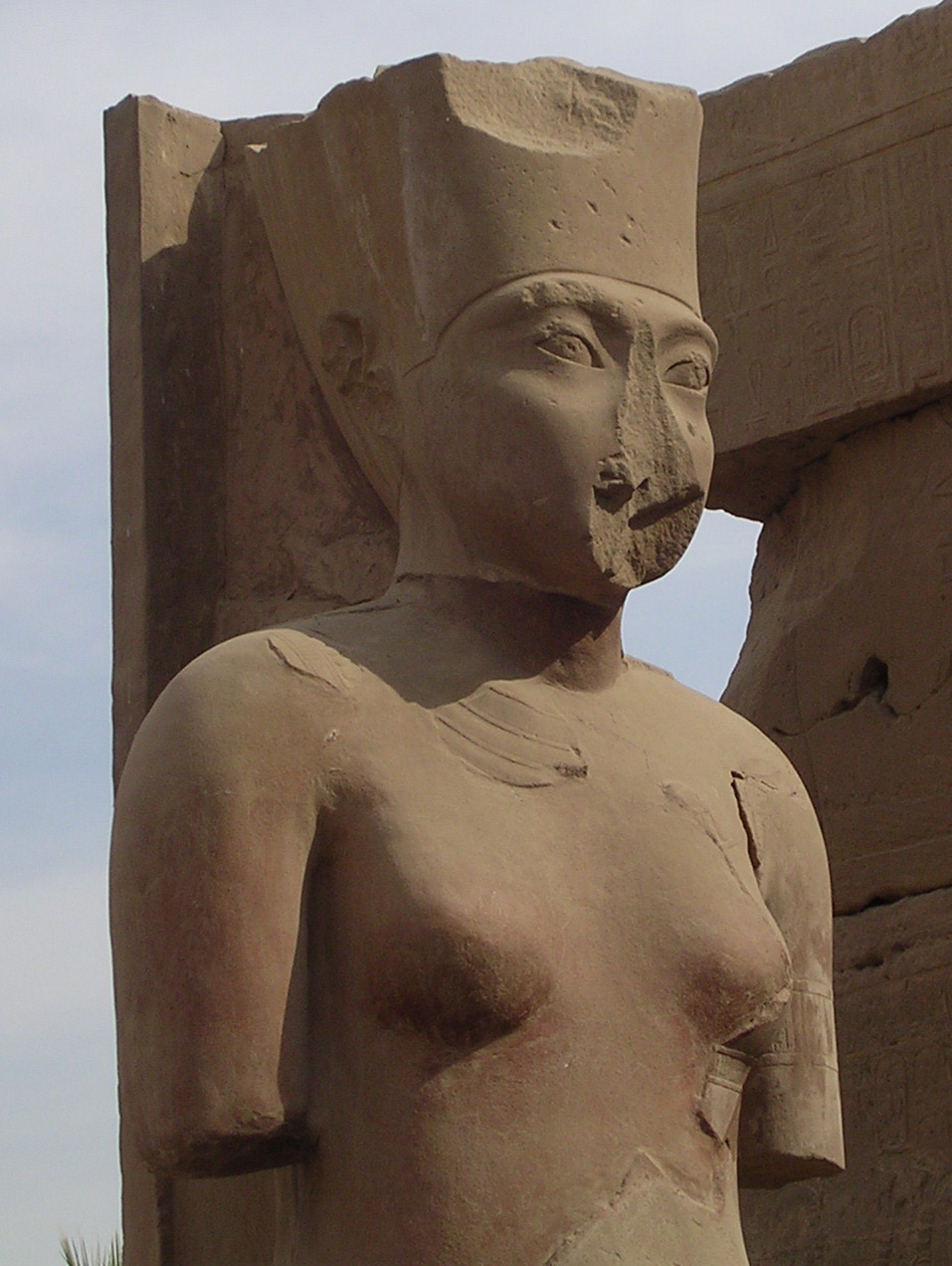
Statue of Amunet, with features of Ankhesenamun.

A document was found in the ancient Hittite capital of Hattusa dating back to the Amarna period. The document—part of the so-called Deeds of Suppiluliuma I—relates that Hittite ruler, Suppiluliuma I, while laying siege to Karkemish, received a letter from the Egyptian queen. The letter reads:

My husband has died and I have no son. They say about you that you have many sons. You might give me one of your sons to become my husband. I would not wish to take one of my subjects as a husband... I am afraid.

This document is considered extraordinary, as Egyptians traditionally considered foreigners to be inferior. Suppiluliuma I was amazed and exclaimed to his courtiers:

Nothing like this has happened to me in my entire life!

Suppiluliuma sent an envoy to investigate and eventually did send one of his sons, Zannanza, but the prince died en route, perhaps being murdered.

The identity of the queen who wrote the letter is uncertain. In the Hittite annals, she is called Dakhamunzu, a transliteration of the Egyptian title, Tahemetnesu (The King's Wife). Possible candidates for the author of the letter are Nefertiti, Meritaten, and Ankhesenamun. Ankhesenamun once seemed likely since there were no royal candidates for the throne on the death of her husband, Tutankhamun, whereas Akhenaten had at least two legitimate successors. But this was based on a 27-year reign for the last pharaoh of the 18th dynasty, Horemheb, who is now accepted to have had a shorter reign of only 14 years. Since Nefertiti was depicted as powerful as her husband in official monuments smiting Egypt's enemies, researcher Nicholas Reeves believes she might be the Dakhamunzu in the Amarna correspondence. That would make the subject deceased Egyptian king appear to be Akhenaten rather than Tutankhamun. As noted, Akhenaten had potential heirs, including Tutankhamun, to whom Nefertiti could be married. Other researchers focus upon the phrase regarding marriage to 'one of my subjects' (translated by some as 'servants') as possibly a reference to the Grand Vizier Ay or a secondary member of the Egyptian royal family line, however, and that Ankhesenamun may have been being pressured by Ay to marry him and legitimize his claim to the throne of Egypt (which she eventually did).

== Mummy KV21A ==
DNA testing announced in February 2010 has generated speculation that Ankhesenamun is one of two 18th Dynasty queens recovered from KV21 in the Valley of the Kings.

The two newborns found buried with Tutankhamun have been proven to be his children, and the current theory is that Ankhesenamun, his only known wife, is their mother. However, not enough data was obtained to make more than a tentative identification. Nevertheless, the KV21a mummy has DNA consistent with the 18th Dynasty royal line.

However, genetic research suggests that the KV55 male who is presumed to Akhenaten, cannot be maternal grandfather of Tutankhamun's children, therefore KV21a cannot be his daughter. According Juan Belmonte the most likely explenation is that KV55 mummy does not belong to Akhenaten but to Smenkhkare, or alternatively, Tutankhamun fathered his daughters by a different woman than Ankhesenamun. It was also proposed that KV55 body is Akhenaten and KV21a is Ankhesenamun, but Akhenaten was not her biological father as result of Nefertiti's extramarital affair, which Belmonte notes as "historical speculation, possible but improbable".

== KV63 ==
After excavating the tomb KV63, it is speculated that it was designed for Ankhesenamun due to its proximity to the tomb of Tutankhamun, KV62. Also found in the tomb were coffins (one with an imprint of a woman on it), women's clothing, jewelry, and natron. Fragments of pottery bearing the partial name Paaten were also in the tomb. The only royal person known to bear this name was Ankhesenamun, whose name was originally Ankhesenpaaten. However, no mummies were found in KV63.

== Damnatio memoriae ==
Ankhesenamun is believed to have married king Ay, Tutankhamun's successor after her husband's unexpected death. However, Ay and his army chief, Horemheb became political rivals at court during Ay's reign. Ay attempted to sideline Horemheb from the royal succession by naming General Nakhtmin as the "King Son". As Nozomu Kawai writes: "This title is undoubtedly superior to Horemheb’s status. Therefore, King Ay intended to relegate Horemheb to a less important position and replace him with Nakhtmin to carry out his functions. We do not know exactly when Nakhtmin was promoted, but this must have created Horemheb’s strong hostility against King Ay."

When Horemheb instead came to power as Ay's successor and became the final king of the 18th dynasty of Egypt, he carried out a damnatio memoriae campaign against his rival Ay by usurping Ay's mortuary temple, desecrating Ay's WV23 royal tomb and erased as many inscriptions and depictions of Ay as possible in revenge. Ay's royal sarcophagus in his tomb was smashed into numerous fragments. However, Ankhesenamun also fell victim to Horemheb's anger at Ay's actions. As Nozomu Kawai writes:

"At the same time, Ankhesenamun became the target of a damnatio memoriae by Horemheb. The evidence indicates that she was persecuted severely. On the lunette of the Restoration Stela of Tutankhamun, which was usurped by Horemheb, her figures were completely erased and replaced by an inscription instead of changing her image to that of his [ie. Horemheb's] wife, Queen Mutnodjmet. An inlaid stela of Tutankhamun at Karnak shows a large, sharp, rectangular cavity containing some perforations behind the king who presents offering to Amun and Mut. The presence of the perforations indicates that there was a figure behind him. Since the figure of the queen is regularly behind the king, it is probable that the figure of Ankhesenamun was deliberately removed by Horemheb. These extreme acts of damnatio memoriae against Ankhesenamun were probably due to some historical events that rankled Horemheb."

Horemheb, therefore, attempted to erase all memory of Ay, Ay's allies and Ankhesenamun when he became pharaoh.

== Popular culture ==
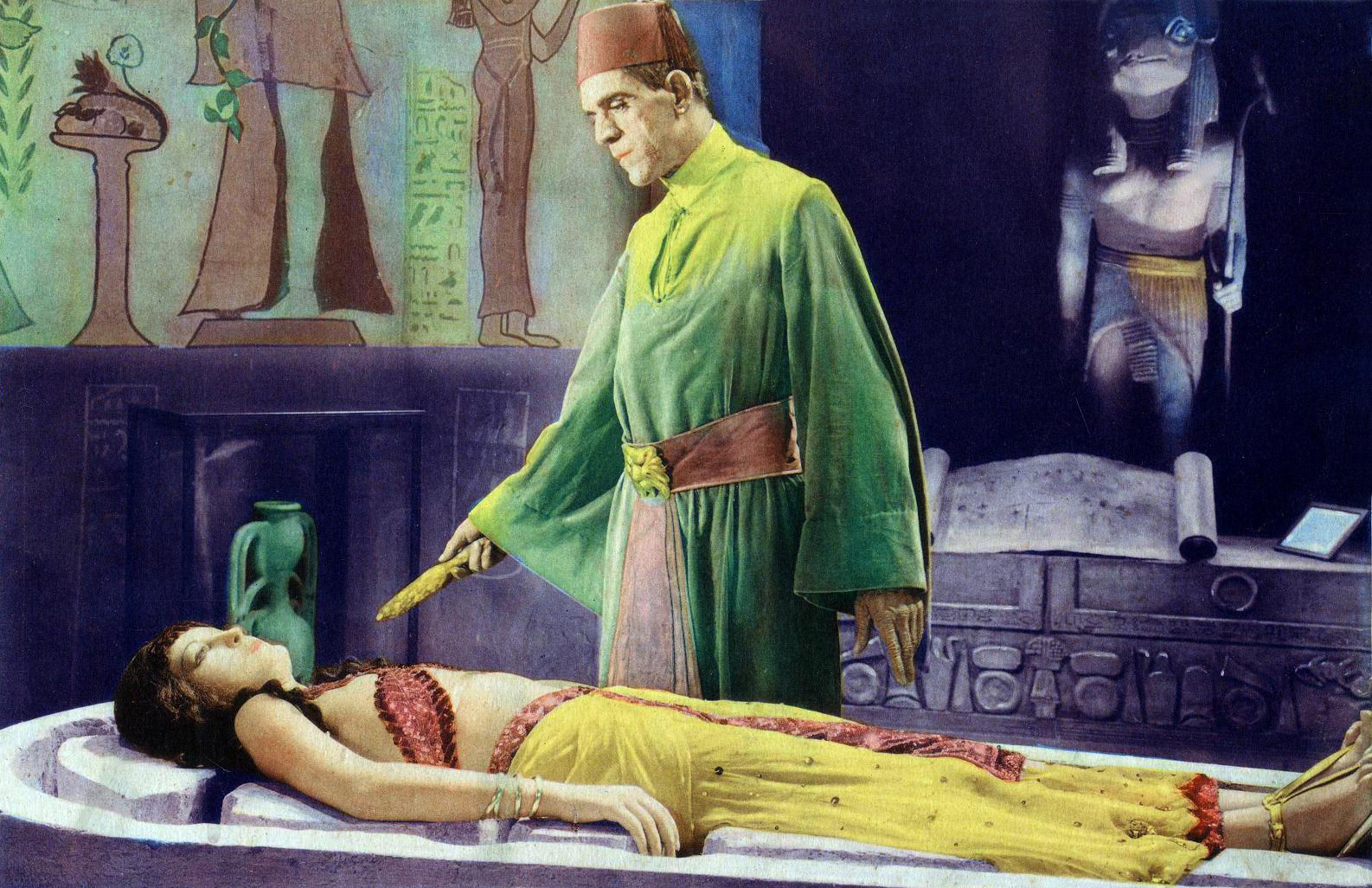
Zita Johann playing Princess Anck-es-en-amon in The Mummy, 1932

Ankhesenamun's name has entered popular culture as the secret love of the priest Imhotep in the 1932 film The Mummy. The 1999 remake, its sequel and its spin-off television series used the name Anck-su-namun, while other movies like The Mummy's Hand (1940) and the 1959 remake of the Universal film series named the character Ananka.

Ankhsenpaaten/Ankhsenamun is the heroine protagonist of the novel The Lost Queen of Egypt written by Lucille Morrison in 1937 detailing a fictionalized version of the princess' life before and after marriage to Tutankhamen.

Ankhesenamun is the protagonist of the 1988 French novel La Reine Soleil by Christian Jacq, as well as its 2007 animated adaptation.

== Gallery ==
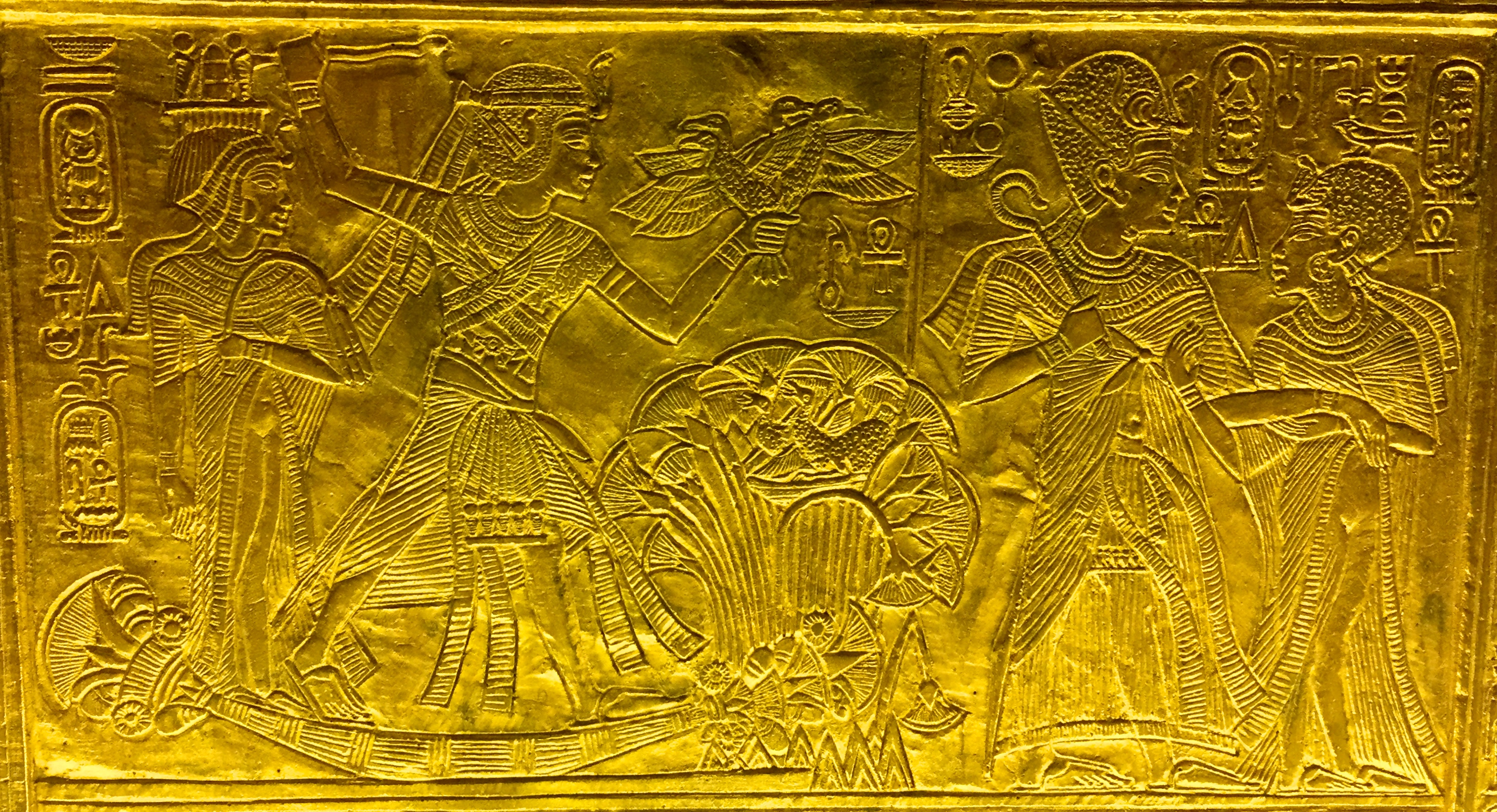
Double scene of Ankhesenamun and Tutankhamun

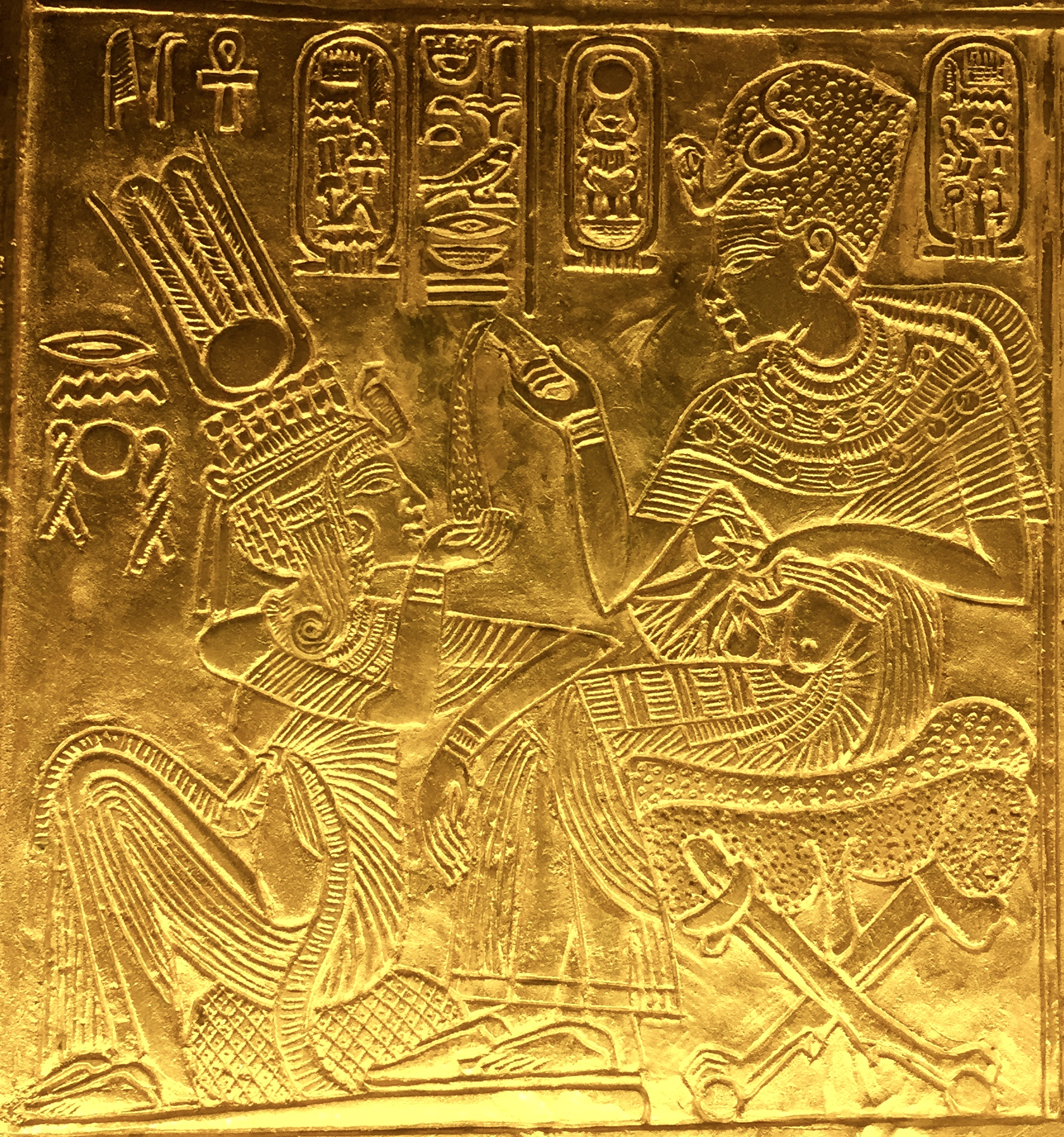
Scene from the golden shrine of Tutankhamun. King and Queen are seated and Tutankhamun seems to pour ointment on Queen's hand.

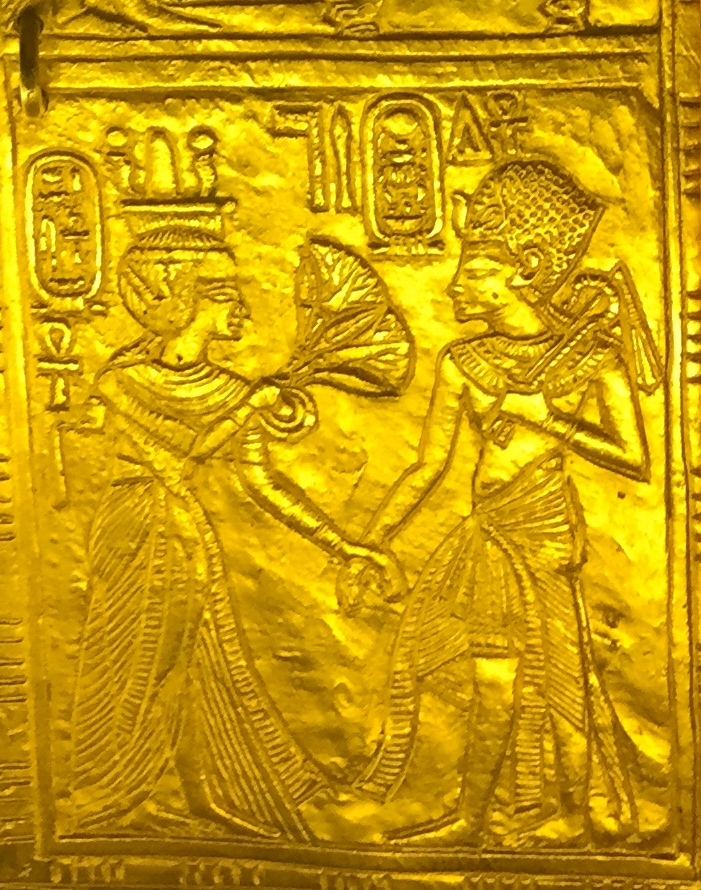
Ankhesenamun offering flowers to Tutankhamun

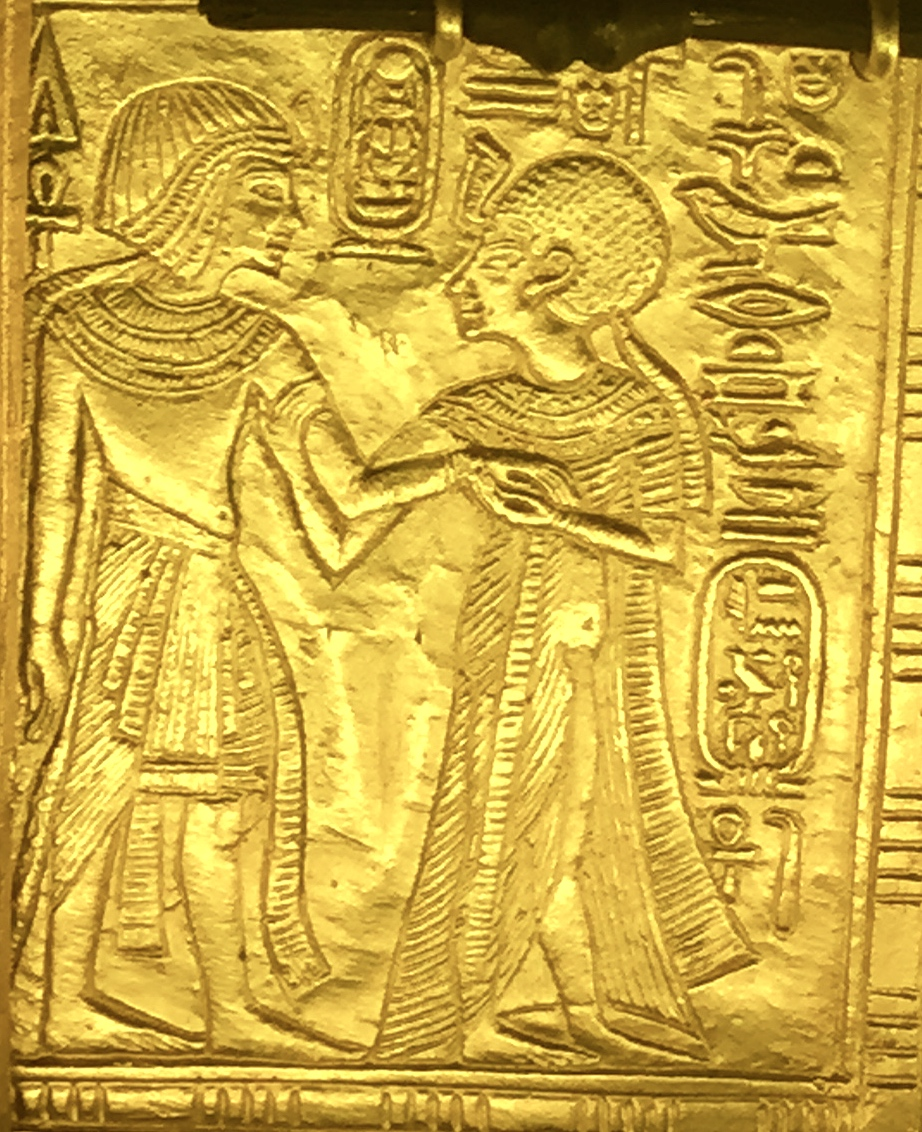
Scene from gilded shrine of Tutankhamen showing him and his wife Queen Ankhesenamun

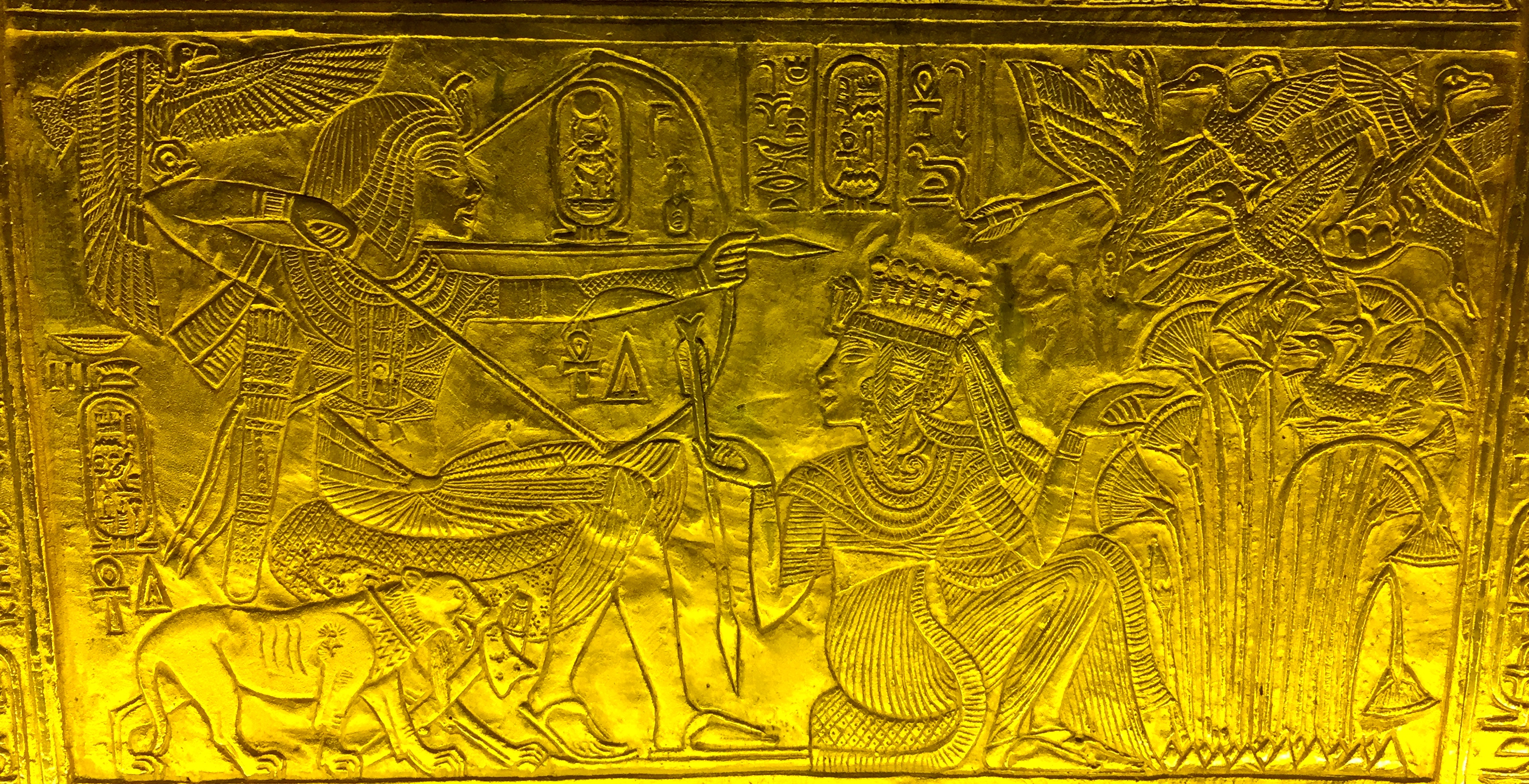
Ankhesenamun handing arrow to seated Tutankhamun

== Ancestry and family ==
Amenhotep II	Tiaa
Thutmose IV	Mutemwiya	Yuya	Tjuyu
Amenhotep III	Tiye	Ay
The Younger Lady	Akhenaten	Nefertiti
Tutankhamun	Smenkhkare	Meritaten	Meketaten	Ankhesenamun	Neferneferuaten Tasherit	Neferneferure	Setepenre
2 daughters
