= Nefertiti =

Wife of the Egyptian pharaoh Akhenaten

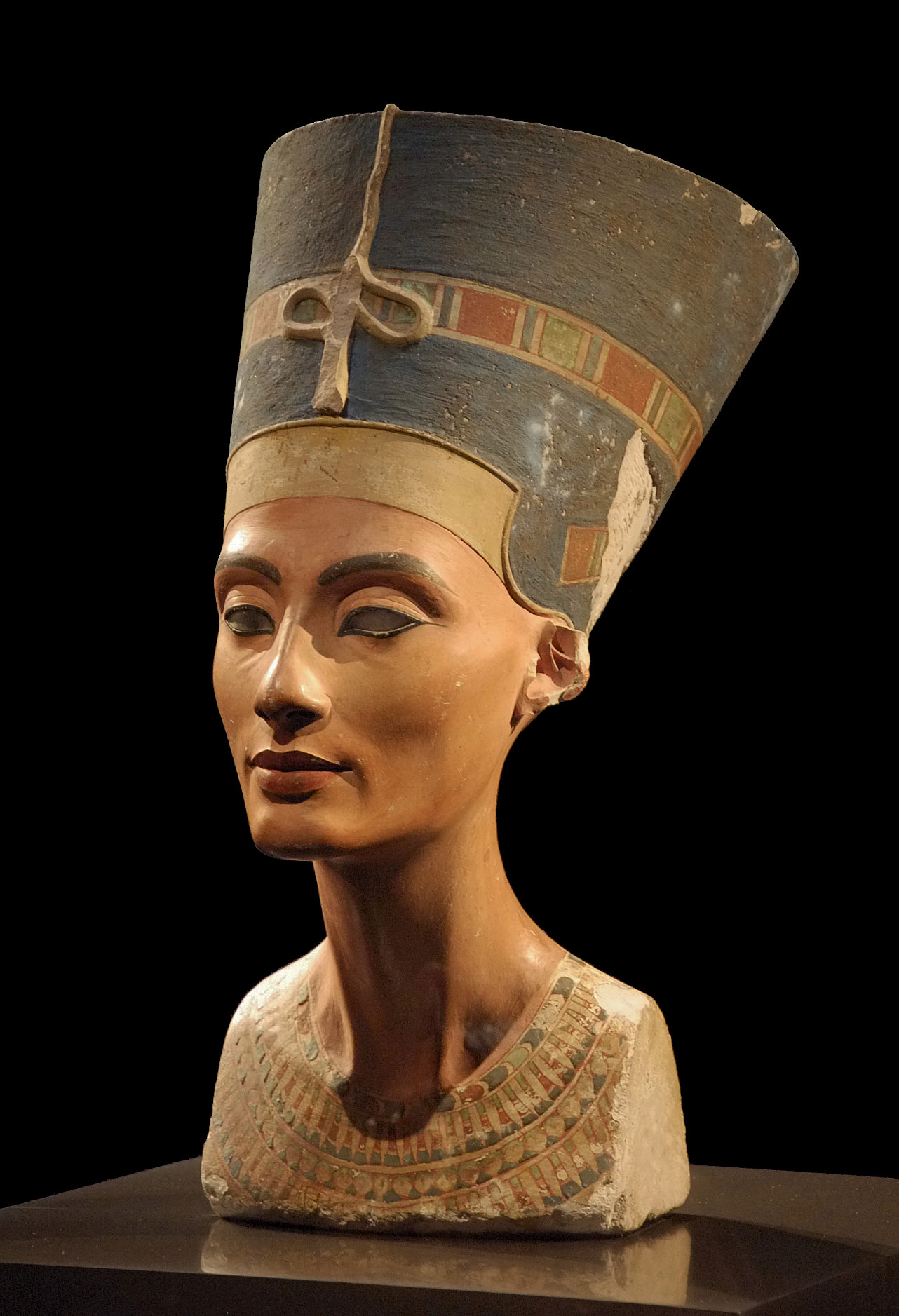
- The bust of Nefertiti from the Egyptian Museum of Berlin collection, currently in the Neues Museum

Queen consort of Egypt
- Tenure: 1353–1336 BC or 1351–1334 BC

Pharaoh
- Reign: c. 1334–1332 BC
- Predecessor: Akhenaten or Smenkhkare
- Successor: likely Tutankhamun
- Spouse: Akhenaten
- Issue: Meritaten; Meketaten; Ankhesenamun; Neferneferuaten Tasherit; Neferneferure; Setepenre
- Dynasty: 18th of Egypt
- Religion: Atenism

Neferneferuaten-Nefertiti in hieroglyphs
X1 N35 N5 M17 F35 F35 F35 F35 F35 M18 X1 Z4 B1
Neferneferuaten Nefertiti
Nfr nfrw itn Nfr.t jy.tj
Beautiful are the Beauties of Aten, the Beautiful one has come
- Great Royal Wife of Pharaoh Akhenaten

Nefertiti (/ˌnɛfərˈtiːti/; c. 1370 – c. 1330 BC) was a queen of the 18th Dynasty of Ancient Egypt, the great royal wife of Pharaoh Akhenaten. Nefertiti and her husband were known for their radical overhaul of state religious policy, in which they promoted an exclusivist and possibly even monotheistic religion, Atenism, centred on the sun disc and its direct connection to the royal household. With her husband, she reigned at what was arguably the wealthiest period of ancient Egyptian history.

After her husband's death, some scholars believe that Nefertiti ruled briefly as the female pharaoh known by the throne name Neferneferuaten just before the ascension of Tutankhamun. This identification is a matter of ongoing debate. If Nefertiti did rule as pharaoh, her reign was marked by the fall of Amarna and the relocation of the capital back to the traditional city of Memphis after her death.

In the 20th century, Nefertiti was made famous by the discovery and display of her ancient bust, now in Berlin's Neues Museum. The bust is one of the most copied works of the art of ancient Egypt. It is attributed to the Egyptian sculptor Thutmose, and was excavated from his buried studio complex in the early 20th century.

== Names and titles ==
Nefertiti had many titles, including:

- Neferneferuaten (Beautiful is the beauty of Aten) nfr-nfrw-jtn
- Hereditary Princess (iryt-p`t)
- Great of Praises (wrt-Hzwt)
- Lady of Grace (nebet-imat, nbt-jmꜣt)
- Sweet of Love (beneret-merut, bnrt-mrwt)
- Lady of The Two Lands (nebet-tawi, nbt-tꜣwj)
- Main King's Wife, his beloved (hemet-nesut-aat meretef, ḥmt-nswt-ꜥꜣt mrt.f)
- Great King's Wife, his beloved (hemet-nesut-weret meretef, ḥmt-nswt-wrt mrt.f)
- Lady of All Women (henut-hemut-nebut, ḥnwt-ḥmwt-nbwt)
- Mistress of Upper & Lower Egypt (henut-shemau-mehu, ḥnwt-šmꜣw-mḥw).

While modern Egyptological pronunciation renders her name as Nefertiti, her name was the sentence nfr.t jj.tj (or Nfr.t-jy.tj), meaning "the beautiful one has come", and probably contemporarily pronounced Naftita from older Nafrat-ita or perhaps Nafert-yiti.

== Family and early life ==
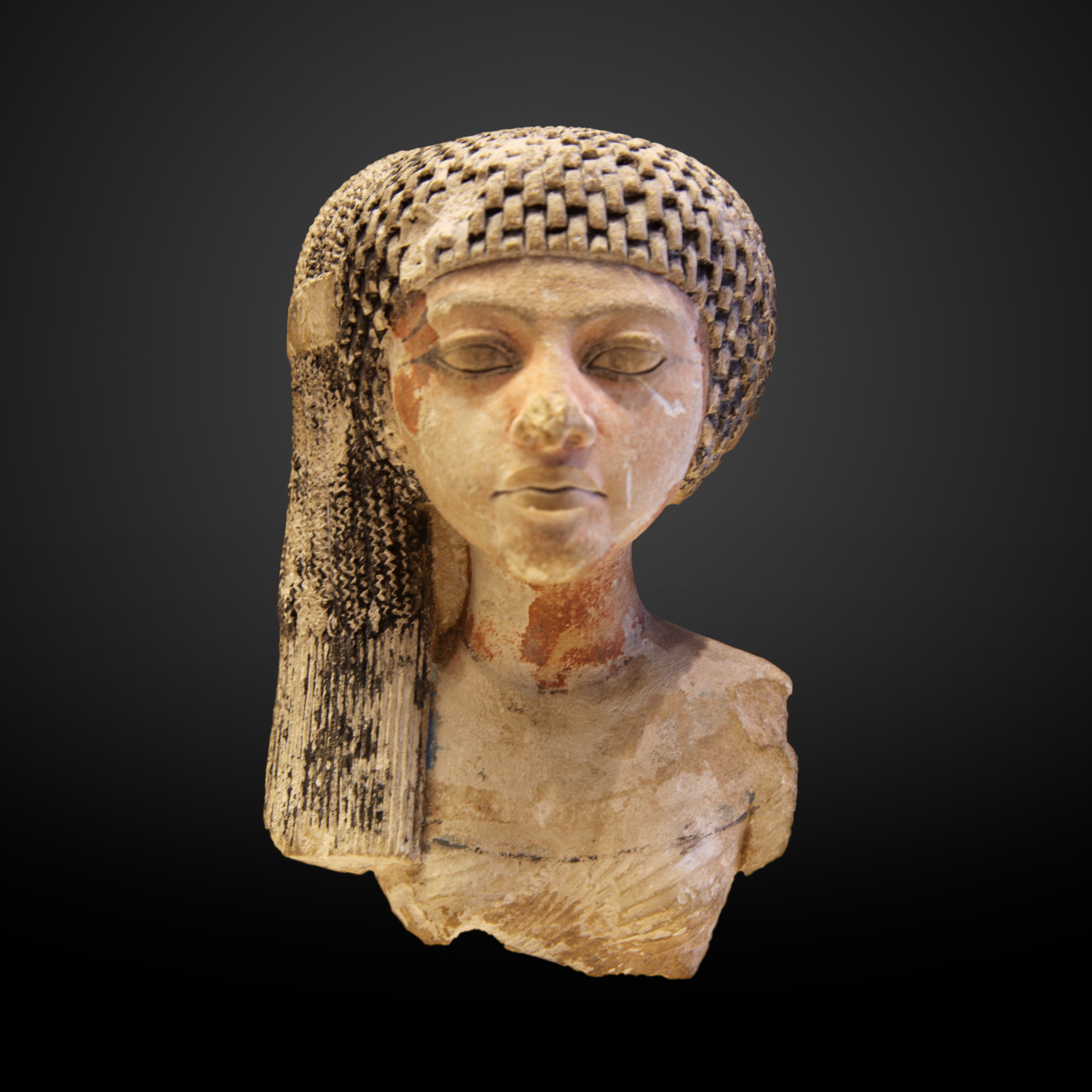
Bust of a daughter of Akhenaten and Nefertiti, perhaps the young Meritaten, in the Louvre, Paris

Almost nothing is known about Nefertiti's life before her marriage to Akhenaten. Scenes from the tombs of the nobles in Amarna mention that Nefertiti had a sister, named Mutbenret. Further, a woman named Tey carried the title of "Nurse of the Great Royal Wife". In addition, Tey's husband Ay carried the title "God's Father". Some Egyptologists believe that this title was used for a man whose daughter married the pharaoh. Based on these titles, it has been proposed that Ay was in fact Nefertiti's father. However, neither Ay nor Tey are explicitly referred to as Nefertiti's parents in the existing sources. At the same time, no sources exist that directly contradict Ay's fatherhood which is considered likely due to the great influence he wielded during Nefertiti's life and after her death. According to another theory, Nefertiti was the daughter of Ay and a woman other than Tey. Ay's first wife may have died before Nefertiti became queen, after which Ay married Tey, making her Nefertiti's stepmother. Nevertheless, this entire proposal is based on speculation and conjecture.

It has also been proposed that Nefertiti was Akhenaten's full sister, though this is contradicted by her titles which do not include the title of "King's Daughter" or "King's Sister", usually used to indicate a relative of a pharaoh. Another theory about her parentage that gained some support identified Nefertiti with the Mitanni princess Tadukhipa, partially based on Nefertiti's name ("The Beautiful Woman has Come") which has been interpreted by some scholars as signifying a foreign origin. However, Tadukhipa was already married to Akhenaten's father and there is no evidence for any reason why this woman would need to alter her name in a proposed marriage to Akhenaten, nor any hard evidence of a foreign non-Egyptian background for Nefertiti.

The exact dates when Nefertiti married Akhenaten and became the king's great royal wife are uncertain. They are known to have had at least six daughters together, including Meritaten, Meketaten, Ankhesenpaaten (later called Ankhesenamun when she married Tutankhamun), Neferneferuaten Tasherit, Neferneferure, and Setepenre. She was once considered as a candidate for the mother of Tutankhamun, however a genetic study conducted on discovered mummies suggests that she was not.

== Life ==
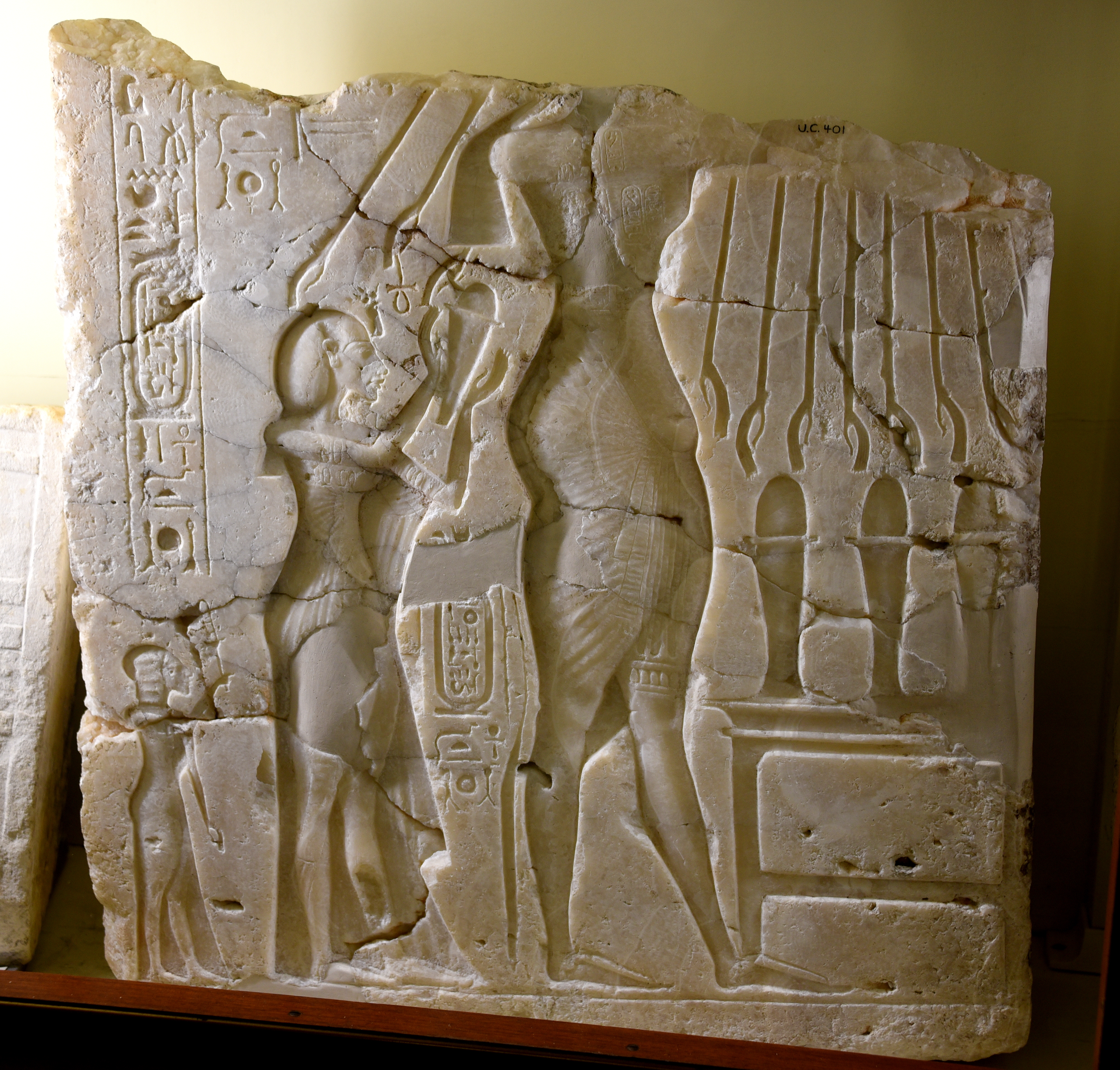
Alabaster sunken relief depicting Akhenaten, Nefertiti, and their daughter Meritaten. Early Aten cartouches on king's arm and chest. From Amarna, Egypt. 18th Dynasty. The Petrie Museum of Egyptian Archaeology, London

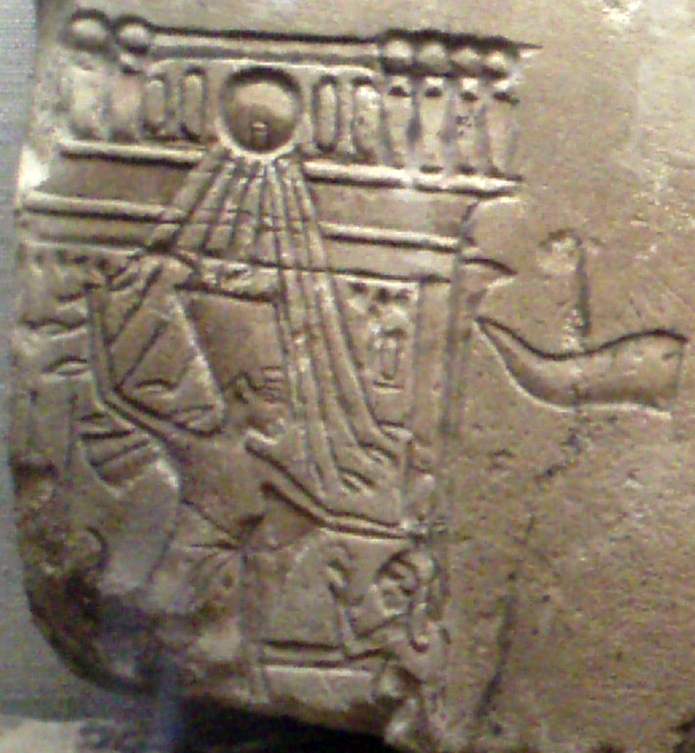
Close-up of a limestone relief depicting Nefertiti smiting a female captive on a royal barge. On display at the Museum of Fine Arts, Boston.

Nefertiti first appears in scenes in Thebes. In the damaged tomb (TT188) of the royal butler Parennefer, the new king Amenhotep IV is accompanied by a royal woman, and this lady is thought to be an early depiction of Nefertiti. The king and queen are shown worshiping the Aten. In the tomb of the vizier Ramose, Nefertiti is shown standing behind Amenhotep IV in the Window of Appearance during the reward ceremony for the vizier.

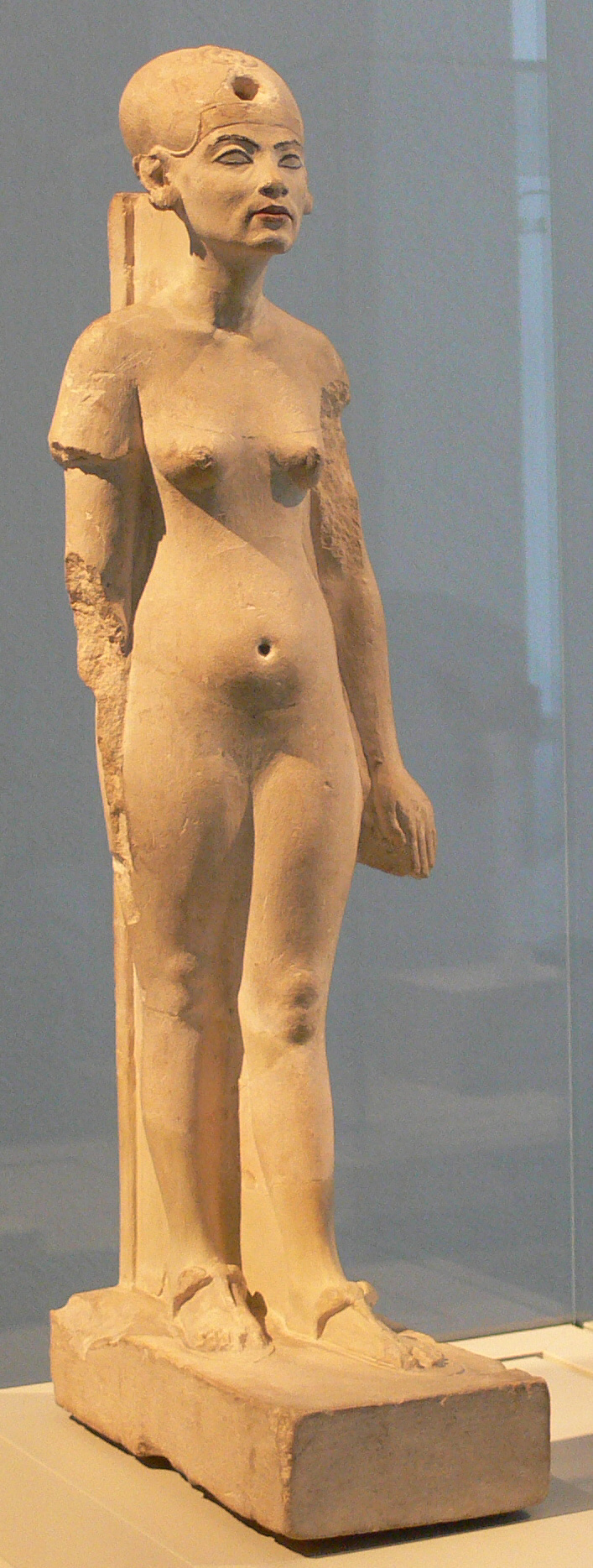
A standing/striding figure of Nefertiti made of limestone. Originally from Amarna, part of the Ägyptisches Museum Berlin collection.

During the early years in Thebes, Akhenaten (still known as Amenhotep IV) had several temples erected at Karnak. One of the structures, the Mansion of the Benben (hwt-ben-ben), was dedicated to Nefertiti. She is depicted with her daughter Meritaten and in some scenes the princess Meketaten participates as well. From all the scenes preserved on talatat that can be dated to the first five years of Akhenaten’s reign, Nefertiti is depicted almost twice as frequently as her husband, indicating her exceptionally high visibility during this period and demonstrating her political importance. She is shown appearing behind her husband the pharaoh in offering scenes in the role of the queen supporting her husband, but she is also depicted in scenes that would have normally been the prerogative of the king. She is shown smiting the enemy, and captive enemies decorate her throne.

In the fourth year of his reign, Amenhotep IV decided to move the capital to Akhetaten (modern Amarna). In his fifth year, Amenhotep IV officially changed his name to Akhenaten, and Nefertiti was henceforth known as Neferneferuaten-Nefertiti. The name change was a sign of the ever-increasing importance of the cult of the Aten. It changed Egypt's religion from a polytheistic religion to a religion which may have been better described as a monolatry (the depiction of a single god as an object for worship) or henotheism (one god, who is not the only god).

The boundary stelae of years 4 and 5 mark the boundaries of the new city and suggest that the move to the new city of Akhetaten occurred around that time. The new city contained several large open-air temples dedicated to the Aten. Nefertiti and her family would have resided in the Great Royal Palace in the centre of the city and possibly at the Northern Palace as well. Nefertiti and the rest of the royal family feature prominently in the scenes at the palaces and in the tombs of the nobles. Nefertiti's steward during this time was an official named Meryre II. He would have been in charge of running her household.

Inscriptions in the tombs of Huya and Meryre II dated to Year 12, 2nd month of Peret, Day 8 show a large foreign tribute. The people of Kharu (the north) and Kush (the south) are shown bringing gifts of gold and precious items to Akhenaten and Nefertiti. In the tomb of Meryre II, Nefertiti's steward, the royal couple is shown seated in a kiosk with their six daughters in attendance. This is one of the last times princess Meketaten is shown alive.

Two representations of Nefertiti that were excavated by Flinders Petrie appear to show Nefertiti in the middle to later part of Akhenaten's reign 'after the exaggerated style of the early years had relaxed somewhat'. One is a small piece on limestone and is a preliminary sketch of Nefertiti wearing her distinctive tall crown with carving begun around the mouth, chin, ear and tab of the crown. Another is a small inlay head (Petrie Museum Number UC103) modeled from reddish-brown quartzite that was clearly intended to fit into a larger composition.

Meketaten may have died in year 13 or 14. Nefertiti, Akhenaten, and three princesses are shown mourning her. The last dated inscription naming Nefertiti and Akhenaten comes from a building inscription in the limestone quarry at Deir Abu Hinnis. It dates to year 16 of the king's reign and is also the last dated inscription naming the king. Akhenaten is known to have died in his 17th year at Amarna.

The foundation plans for Akhetaten included a sunshade shrine dedicated in Nefertiti's name, indicating her importance in the religious architecture of the new capital.

=== Possible reign as a Pharaoh ===
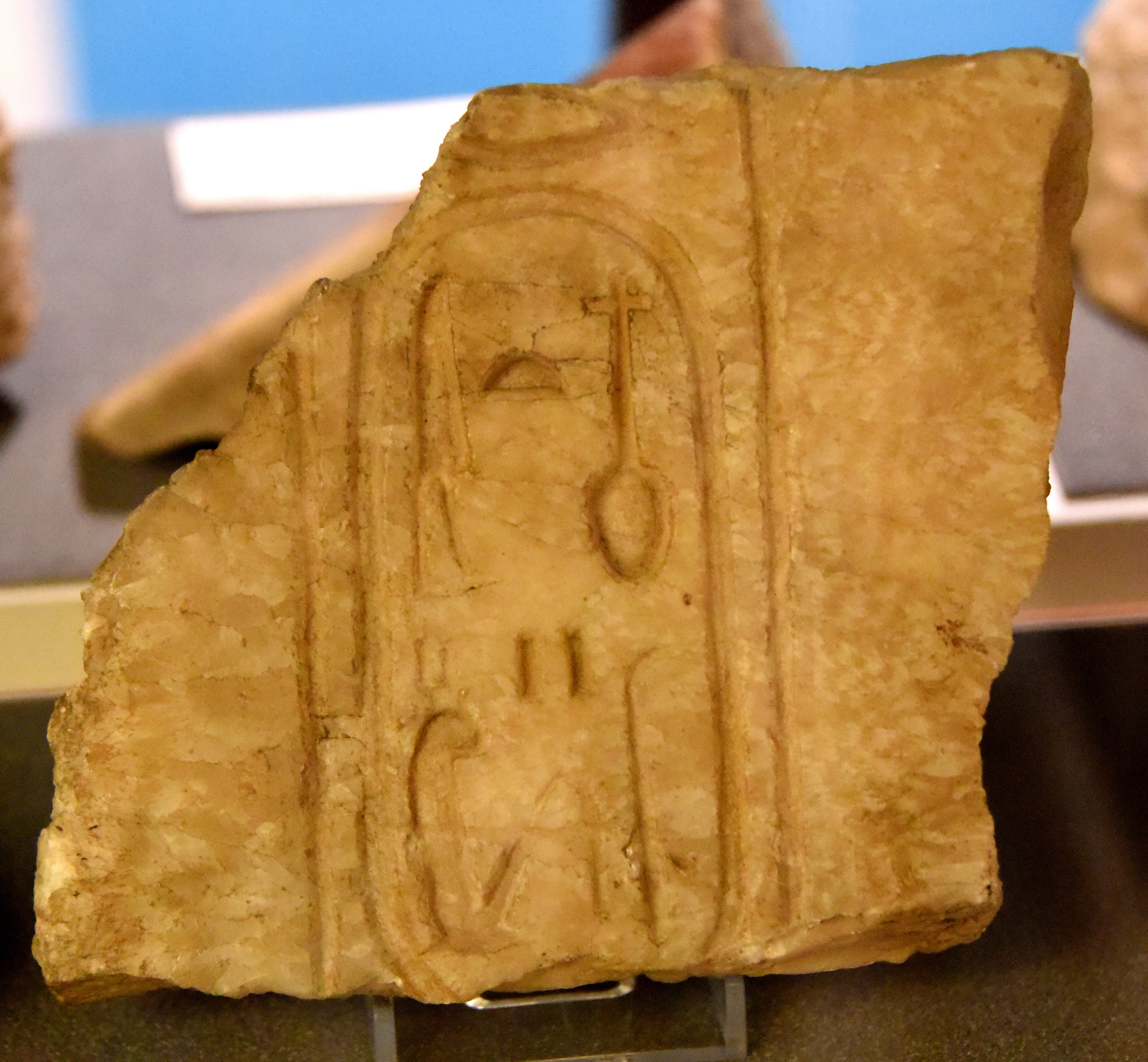
Limestone column fragment showing a cartouche of Nefertiti. Reign of Akhenaten. From Amarna, Egypt. The Petrie Museum of Egyptian Archaeology, London

Many scholars believe Nefertiti had a role elevated from that of great royal wife, and was promoted to co-regent by her husband Pharaoh Akhenaten before his death. She is depicted in many archaeological sites as equal in stature to a King, smiting Egypt's enemies, riding a chariot, and worshipping the Aten in the manner of a pharaoh. When Nefertiti's name disappears from historical records, it is replaced by that of a co-regent named Neferneferuaten, who became a female Pharaoh. It seems likely that Nefertiti, in a similar fashion to the previous female Pharaoh Hatshepsut, assumed the kingship under the name Pharaoh Neferneferuaten after her husband's death. She was then succeeded by Tutankhamun.

It seems less possible that Nefertiti disguised herself as a male and assumed the male alter ego of Smenkhkare. According to Van Der Perre, Smenkhkare is thought to be a co-regent of Akhenaten who died before Neferneferuaten assumed the kingship.

If Nefertiti did rule Egypt as a Pharaoh, it has been theorized that she would have attempted damage control and may have re-instated the ancient Egyptian religion and the Amun priests. She would have raised Tutankhamun in the worship of the traditional gods.

Archaeologist and Egyptologist Dr. Zahi Hawass theorized that Nefertiti returned to Thebes from Amarna to rule as a Pharaoh, based on ushabti and other feminine evidence of a female pharaoh found in Tutankhamun's tomb, as well as evidence of Nefertiti smiting Egypt's enemies which was a duty reserved to kings.

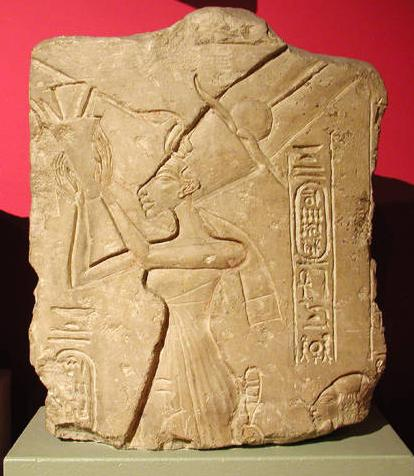
Nefertiti worshipping the Aten. She is given the title of Mistress of the Two Lands. On display at the Ashmolean Museum, Oxford.

=== Old theories about Nefertiti's career ===
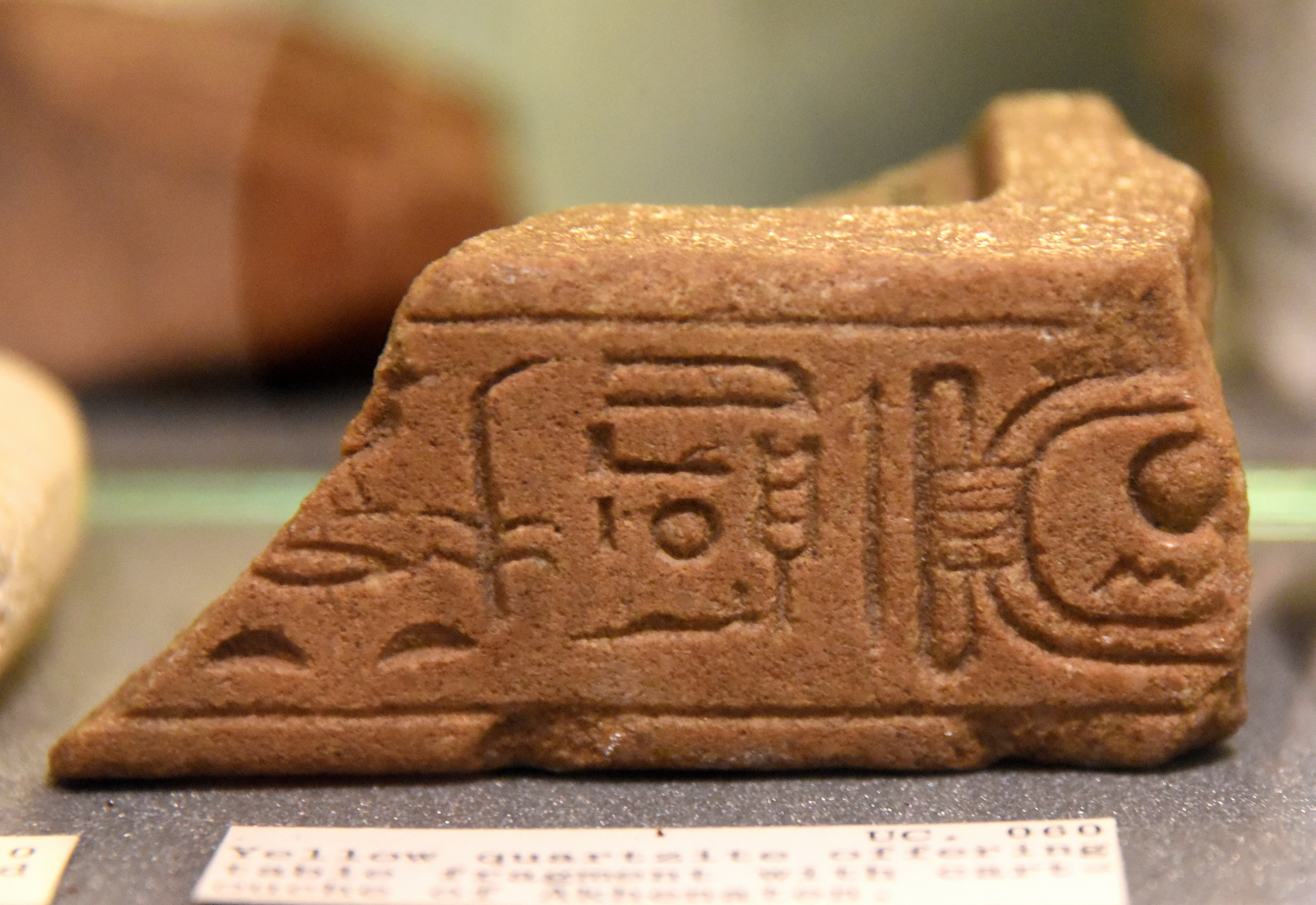
Fragment with cartouche of Akhenaten, which is followed by epithet Great in his Lifespan and the title of Nefertiti Great King's Wife. Reign of Akhenaten. From Amarna, Egypt. The Petrie Museum of Egyptian Archaeology, London

Pre-2012 Egyptological theories assumed that Nefertiti vanished from the historical record around Year 12 of Akhenaten's reign, with no word of her existence thereafter. The conjectured causes of her death and disappearance included injury, a plague that was sweeping through the city, and a natural cause. This theory was based on the discovery of several ushabti fragments inscribed for Nefertiti (now located in the Louvre and the Brooklyn Museum).

A previous theory that she fell into disgrace was discredited when deliberate erasures of monuments belonging to a queen of Akhenaten were shown to refer to Kiya instead.

During Akhenaten's reign (and perhaps after), Nefertiti enjoyed unprecedented power. By the twelfth year of his reign, there is evidence she may have been elevated to the status of co-regent: equal in status to the pharaoh, as may be depicted on the Coregency Stela.

=== New theories about Nefertiti's career as a Pharaoh ===
In 2012, the discovery of an inscription dated to Year 16, month 3 of Akhet, day 15 of the reign of Akhenaten was announced. It was discovered within Quarry 320 in the largest wadi of the limestone quarry project at Dayr Abū Ḥinnis. The five-line inscription, written in red ochre ink, mentions the presence of the "Great Royal Wife, His Beloved, Mistress of the Two Lands, Neferneferuaten Nefertiti". The final line of the inscription refers to ongoing building work being carried out under the authority of the king's scribe Penthu on the Small Aten Temple in Amarna. The Year 16 ink inscription was translated as:

Regnal year 16, first month of the inundation season, day 15. May the King of Upper and Lower Egypt live, he who lives of Maat, the Lord of the Two Lands Neferkheperure Waenre, l.p.h. the Son of Re, who lives of Maat, the Lord of the Crowns Akhenaten, l.p.h., whose life span is long, living forever and ever, the King's Great Wife, his beloved, the lady of the two lands Neferneferuaten-Nefertiti, living forever and ever. Beloved of Re, the ruler of the two horizons, who rejoices in the horizon in his name of Re ///, who comes as the Aten. the /// the work of the Mansion of the Aten, under the authority of the king’s scribe Penthu, under the authority of overseer of work///.

Van der Perre stresses that:

This inscription offers incontrovertible evidence that both Akhenaten and Nefertiti were still alive in the 16th year of his [Akhenaten's] reign and, more importantly, that they were still holding the same positions as at the start of their reign. This makes it necessary to rethink the final years of the Amarna Period.

This means that Nefertiti was alive in the second to last year of Akhenaten's reign, and demonstrates that Akhenaten still ruled alone, with his wife by his side. Therefore, the rule of the female Amarna pharaoh known as Neferneferuaten must be placed between the death of Akhenaten and the accession of Tutankhamun. Neferneferuaten, the female pharaoh, specifically used the epithet "Effective for her husband" in one of her cartouches, which means she was either Nefertiti or her daughter Meritaten (who was married to king Smenkhkare). Moreover, unlike Meritaten, Nefertiti had already used the title "Neferneferuaten" by Year 5 of Akhenaten's reign in her own cartouches.

The number of Egyptologists who today agree that the female pharaoh Neferneferuaten was Nefertiti include Chris Naunton, Aidan Dodson, Athena van der Perre, Nozomu Kawai and James Peter Allen since 2016 in a Göttinger Miszellen article.

In his updated 2016 paper, James P. Allen now also identifies the female pharaoh as Neferneferuaten Nefertiti, and not Akhenaten's daughter who was named Neferneferuaten Tasherit (the younger) as he had previously suggested in a 2009 paper in memory of the late William J. Murnane. Allen states:

The evidence indicates Smenkhkare ruled only about a year at most. ... Smenkhkare's premature death probably no later than Akhenaten's Regnal Year 14 left only the one-to-four year old heir Tutankhuaten as putative heir. ... Tutankhamun must have been considered too young to be named coregent in his father's stead. ... To safeguard Tutankhamun's accession, Akhenaten also appointed a female coregent Ankheperure Neferneferuaten, to oversee the transition and probably to instruct him in the new religion. In 2009, I argued that this coregent was Akhenaten's fourth daughter, Neferneferuaten Tasherit, both because it seemed a logical progression in his attempts to produce a son within each of his daughters as they reached puberty, and because evidence was lacking that the other Neferneferuaten, Nefertiti, was still alive in Akhenaten's final years. The Year 16 inscription noted [for the existence of Akhenaten's chief queen] at the beginning of this article solves the latter problem, and I (and my students) now think it likeliest that the coregent was in fact, Nefertiti. The arguments for this are more compelling than they are for the daughter. ... Since Nefertiti was still chief queen in Regnal Year 16 [of Akhenaten], her Year 3 as pharaoh must have occurred two years after Akhenaten's death, and it was within those two years that the first steps towards reconciliation with Amun occurred. While little is known about the daughter other than her existence, Nefertiti had assumed pharaonic roles and prerogatives throughout Akhenaten’s reign, and the occasional epithet in her nomen Akhet-en-hyes "Beneficial for her husband", both reflects a relationship that had already existed and mirrors Akhenaten's own nomen [Akh-en-Iten or 'The one who is beneficial to the Aten'], which described his relationship not only with his god but also with his predecessor, the Tjehen-Aten "dazzling Aten", Amenhotep III. Moreover, if as now seems probable, the appointment of a female coregent was intended not to ensure her own succession but that of the young Tutankhuaten, then it is far more likely that Akhenaten would have turned to the older more experienced woman who had served as his virtual co-ruler than to a young daughter who had just reached puberty barely three to six years older than the heir she was intended to safeguard.

Aidan Dodson states in his 2020 book titled "Nefertiti: Queen and Pharaoh of Egypt":

The identity of Neferneferuaten has been the subject of considerable debate since her first identification as a woman (pages 128–29, below) but, given that Nefertiti had borne the additional name Neferneferuaten since the early years of her husband's reign (page 26, above), since which time she had received exceptional honors (e.g., pages 13, 40, 61, above), and that she had already become a crowned queen, she must clearly be the leading candidate. Furthermore, Neferneferuaten's nomina in titularies B and C above cite a “husband” who can hardly be anyone other than the Akhenaten who is invoked in the associated prenomina. Accordingly, Nefertiti’s identity with the king Neferneferuaten seems all but transparent. This view is reinforced by the text on the strip between the two knobs on the KV62 box, which names Akhenaten, Neferneferuaten, and Queen Meryetaten, with Neferneferuaten in the place, between her husband and eldest daughter, where Nefertiti had stood canonically since the earliest days. The absence of Smenkhkare, in spite of the presence of his wife [Meritaten or Meryetaten], reinforces the view that the latter was now a widow.

== Death and burial ==
If, as seems likely, Nefertiti was the female pharaoh ruler named Neferneferuaten, she outlived her husband Akhenaten and held great influence over the royal family. If this is the case, that influence and presumably Nefertiti's own life would have ended by Year 3 of Tutankhaten's reign when she died and the Boy King succeeded her (1331 BC). In that year, Tutankhaten changed his name to Tutankhamun which is interpreted as evidence of his return to the official worship of Amun, and abandoned Amarna to return the capital to Memphis and Thebes according to Aidan Dodson.

Other Egyptologists such as Athena van der Perre and Nozomu Kawai conclude that Nefertiti had an independent or sole rule and was not Tutankhamun's senior co-regent on the throne. Kawai states:

{{The fact that a number of objects found in Tutankhamun's tomb had been made for the burial of Neferneferuaten [Nefertiti here], adapted and reinscribed for Tutankhamun's use, implies that Tutankhaten and his entourage did not want to recognize the preceding reign. Neferneferaten had assumed sole reign despite the fact that Tutankhaten, the crown prince, was the legitimate successor [to Akhenaten]. Instead of giving up her kingship to a young boy, Neferneferuaten may have wished to continue her sole rule not only because she was already reigning, but also because Tutankhaten was just a boy between five and 10 years old. Although Neferneferuaten began restoring the cults of Amun and other deities she also simultaneously maintained the cult of Aten at Amarna, resulting in a dissatisfied faction of [royal] officials [such as Ay and Horemheb] and priests who advocated a quick return to orthodoxy.}}

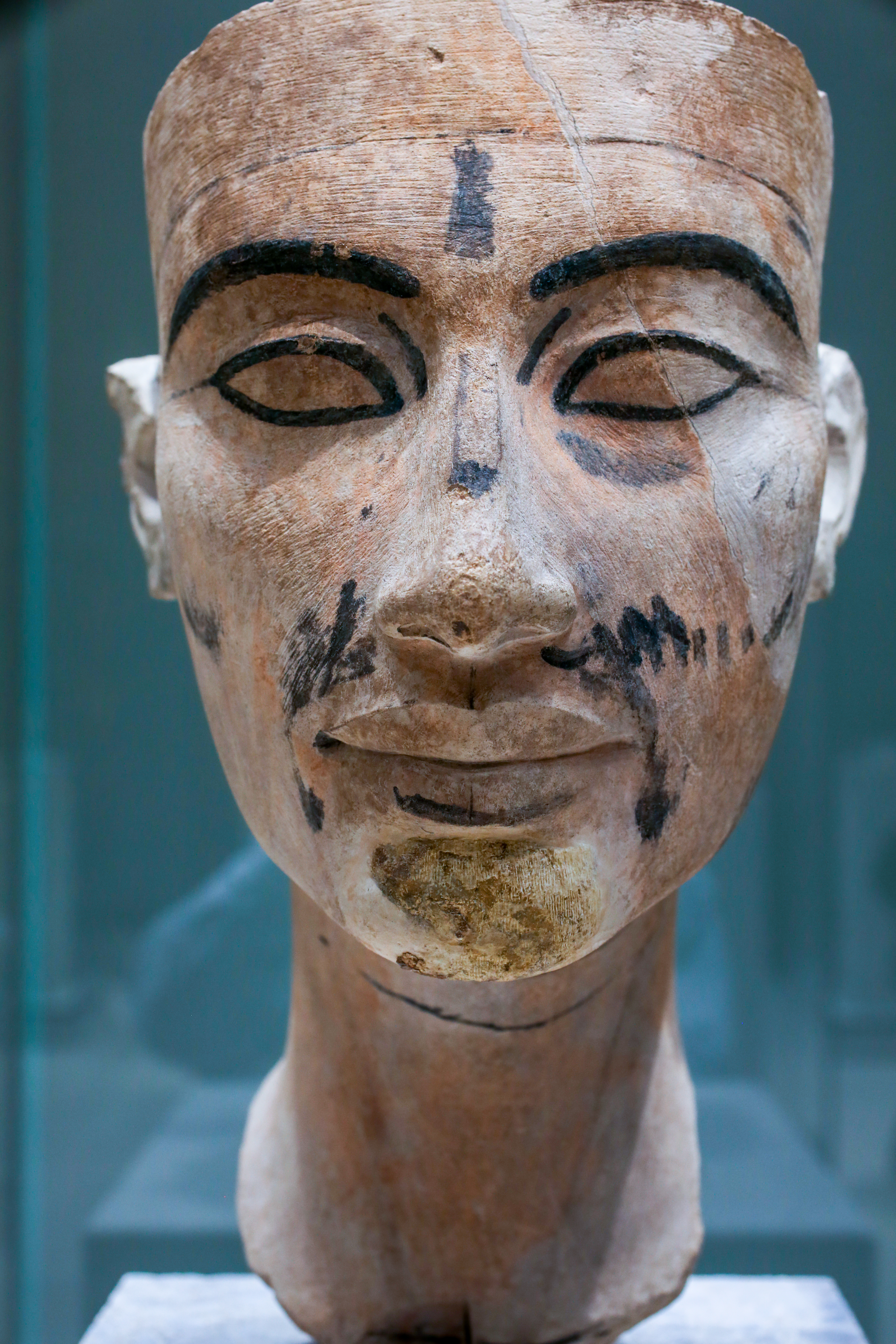
Limestone trial piece showing head of Nefertiti

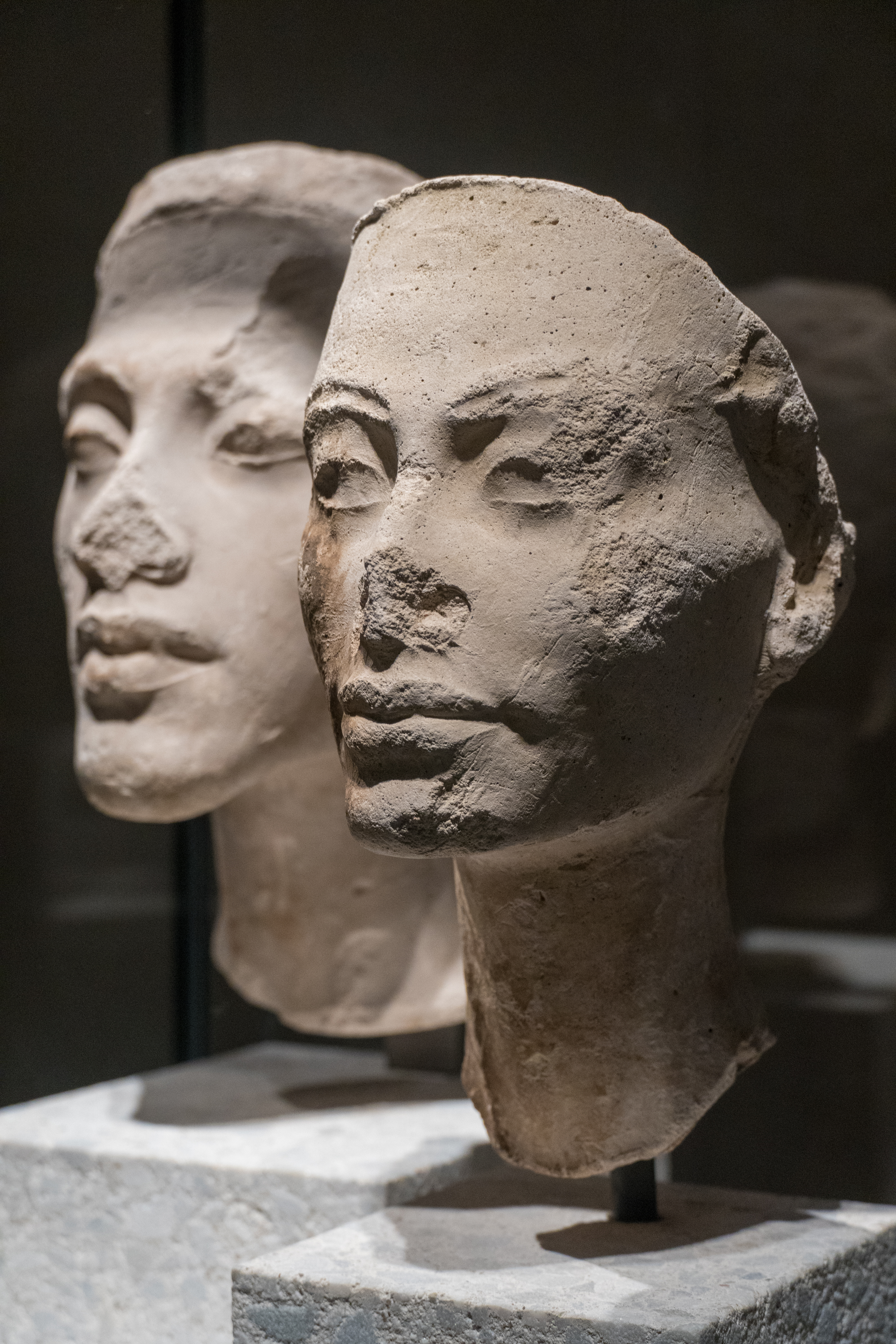
Heads of Akhenaten and Nefertiti, 18th Dynasty Egypt

Nefertiti's burial was intended to be made within the Royal Tomb as laid out in the Boundary Stelae. It is possible that the unfinished annex of the Royal Tomb was intended for her use. However, given that Akhenaten appears to have predeceased her it is highly unlikely she was ever buried there. One shabti is known to have been made for her. The unfinished Tomb 29, which would have been of very similar dimensions to the Royal Tomb had it been finished, is the most likely candidate for a tomb begun for Nefertiti's exclusive use. Given that it lacks a burial chamber, she was not interred there either.

In 1898, French archeologist Victor Loret found two female mummies among those cached inside the tomb of Amenhotep II in KV35 in the Valley of the Kings. These two mummies, known as 'The Elder Lady' and 'The Younger Lady', were identified as likely candidates of her remains.

An article in Kmt magazine in 2001 suggested that the Elder Lady might be Nefertiti. However, it was subsequently shown that the 'Elder Lady' is in fact Tiye, mother of Akhenaten. A lock of hair found in a coffinette bearing an inscription naming Queen Tiye proved a near perfect match to the hair of the 'Elder Lady'. DNA analysis confirmed that she was the daughter of Tiye's parents Yuya and Thuya.

On 9 June 2003 archaeologist Joann Fletcher, a specialist in ancient hair from the University of York in England, announced that Nefertiti's mummy may have been the Younger Lady. This theory was criticised by Zahi Hawass and several other Egyptologists. In a subsequent research project led by Hawass, the mummy was put through CT scan analysis and DNA analysis. Researchers concluded that she was Tutankhamun's biological mother, an unnamed daughter of Amenhotep III and Tiye, not Nefertiti.

In 2015, English archaeologist Nicholas Reeves announced that high resolution scans revealed voids behind the walls of Tutankhamun's tomb which he proposed to be the burial chamber of Nefertiti, but subsequent radar scans showed that there are no hidden chambers.

=== KV21B mummy ===
One of the two female mummies found in KV21 has been suggested as the body of Nefertiti. DNA analysis did not yield enough data to make a definitive identification but confirmed she was a member of the Eighteenth Dynasty royal line. CT scanning revealed she was about 45 at the time of her death; her left arm had been bent over her chest in the 'queenly' pose. The possible identification is based on her association with the mummy tentatively identified as Ankhesenamun. It is suggested that just as a mother and daughter (Tiye and the Younger Lady) were found lying together in KV35, the same was true of these mummies.

== Hittite letters ==
A document was found in the ancient Hittite capital of Hattusa which dates to the Amarna period. The document is part of the so-called Deeds of Suppiluliuma I. While laying siege to Karkemish, the Hittite ruler receives a letter from the Egyptian queen. The letter reads:

My husband has died and I have no son. They say about you that you have many sons. You might give me one of your sons to become my husband. I would not wish to take one of my subjects as a husband... I am afraid.

This proposal is considered extraordinary as New Kingdom royal women never married foreign royalty. Suppiluliuma I was understandably surprised and exclaimed to his courtiers:

Nothing like this has happened to me in my entire life!

Understandably, he was wary, and had an envoy investigate the situation, but by so doing, he missed his chance to bring Egypt into his empire. He eventually did send one of his sons, Zannanza, but the prince died, perhaps murdered, en route.

The identity of the queen who wrote the letter is uncertain. She is called Dakhamunzu in the Hittite annals, a translation of the Egyptian title Ta hemet nesu (The King's Wife). The possible candidates are Nefertiti, Meritaten, and Ankhesenamun. Ankhesenamun once seemed the likeliest, since there were no candidates for the throne on the death of her husband, Tutankhamun, whereas Akhenaten had at least two legitimate successors. But this was based on the assumption of a 27-year reign for the last 18th Dynasty pharaoh, Horemheb, who is now accepted to have had a shorter reign of only 14-16 years. This makes the deceased Egyptian king appear to be Akhenaten instead, rather than Tutankhamun. Furthermore, the phrase regarding marriage to 'one of my subjects' (translated by some as 'servants') is possibly either a reference to the Grand Vizier Ay or a secondary member of the Egyptian royal family line. Since Nefertiti was depicted as being as powerful as her husband in official monuments smiting Egypt's enemies, she might be the Dakhamunzu in the Amarna correspondence, as Nicholas Reeves believes. However, it should be stressed that nothing has been established beyond doubt by Egyptologists here and the widowed queen could still be the late-Tutankhamun's wife, Ankhesenamun.

== Gallery ==
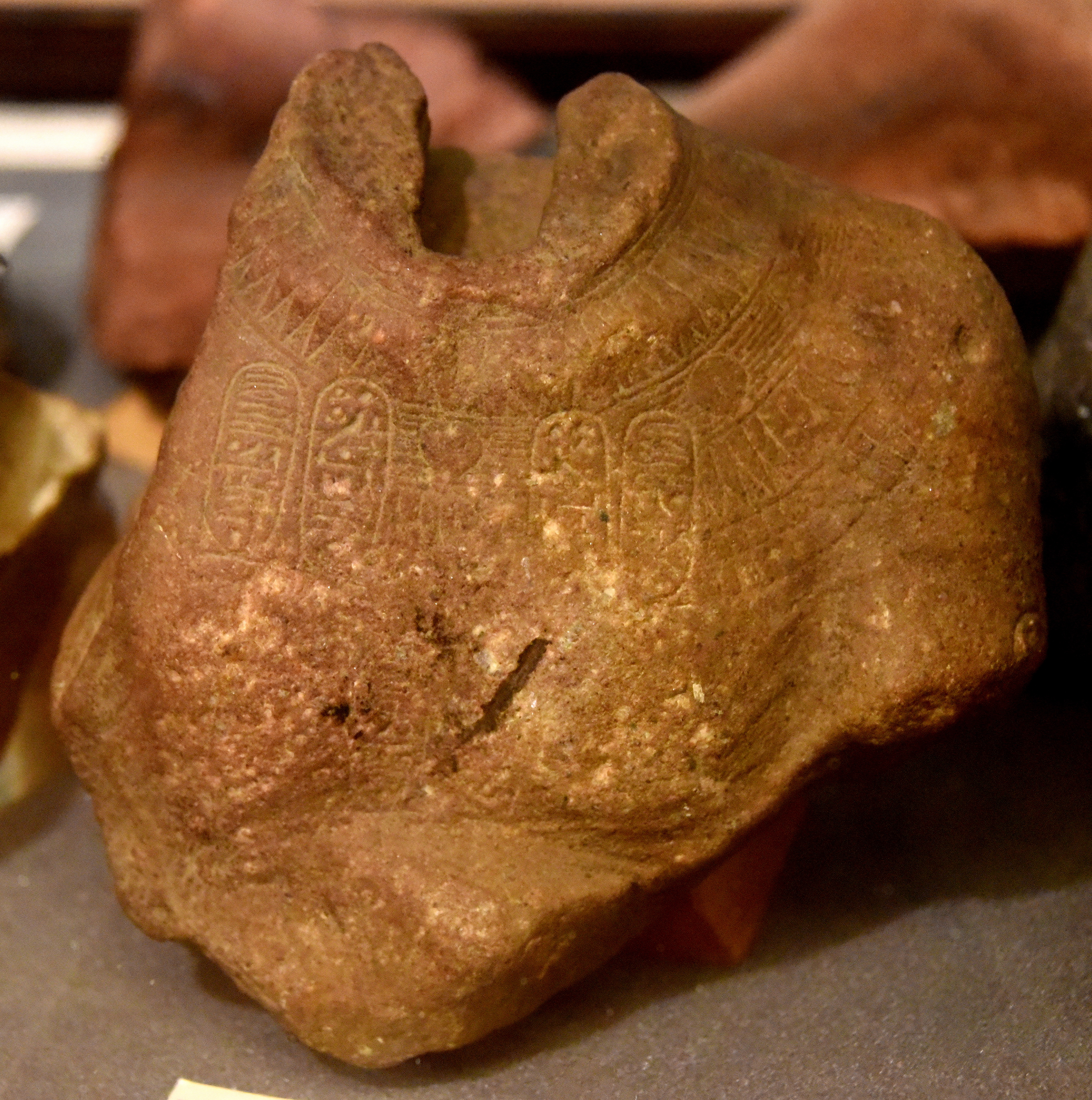
Headless bust of Akhenaten or Nefertiti. Part of a composite red quartzite statue. Intentional damage. Four pairs of early Aten cartouches. Reign of Akhenaten. From Amarna, Egypt. The Petrie Museum of Egyptian Archaeology, London

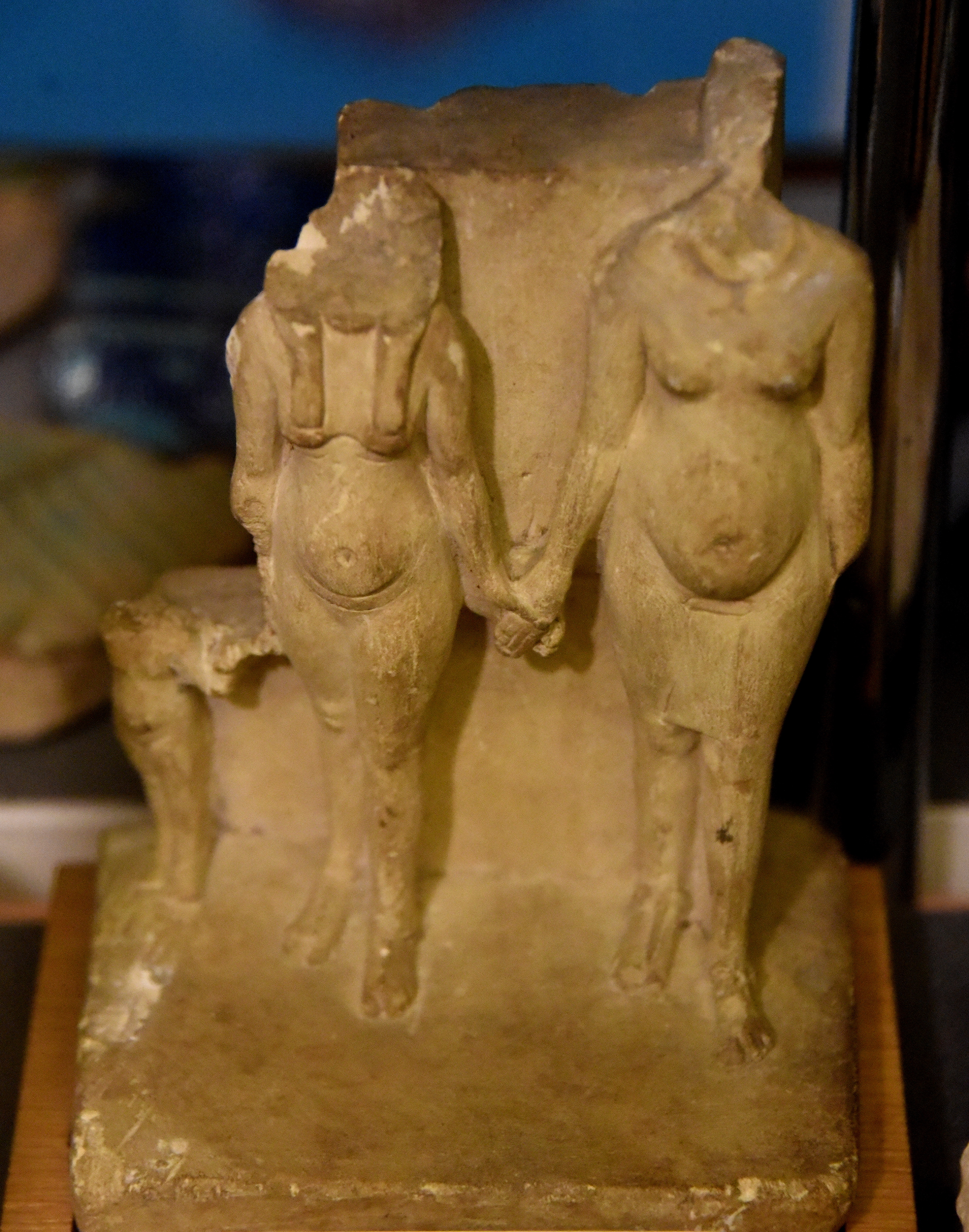
Limestone statuette of Akhenaten and Nefertiti, or Amenhotep III and Tiye, and a princess. Reign of Akhenaten. From Amarna, Egypt. The Petrie Museum of Egyptian Archaeology, London

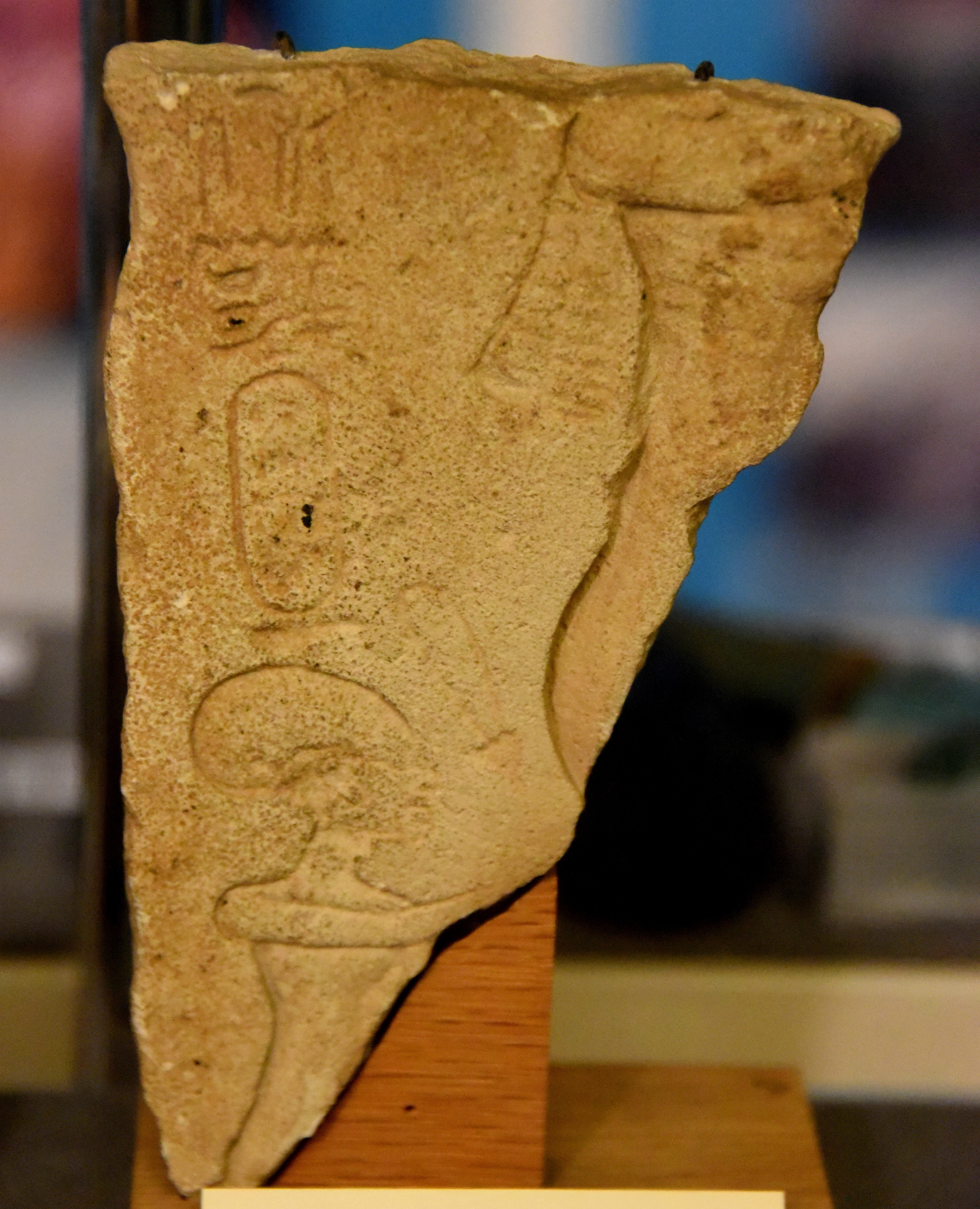
Limestone relief fragment. A princess holding sistrum behind Nefertiti, who is partially seen. Reign of Akhenaten. From Amarna, Egypt. The Petrie Museum of Egyptian Archaeology, London

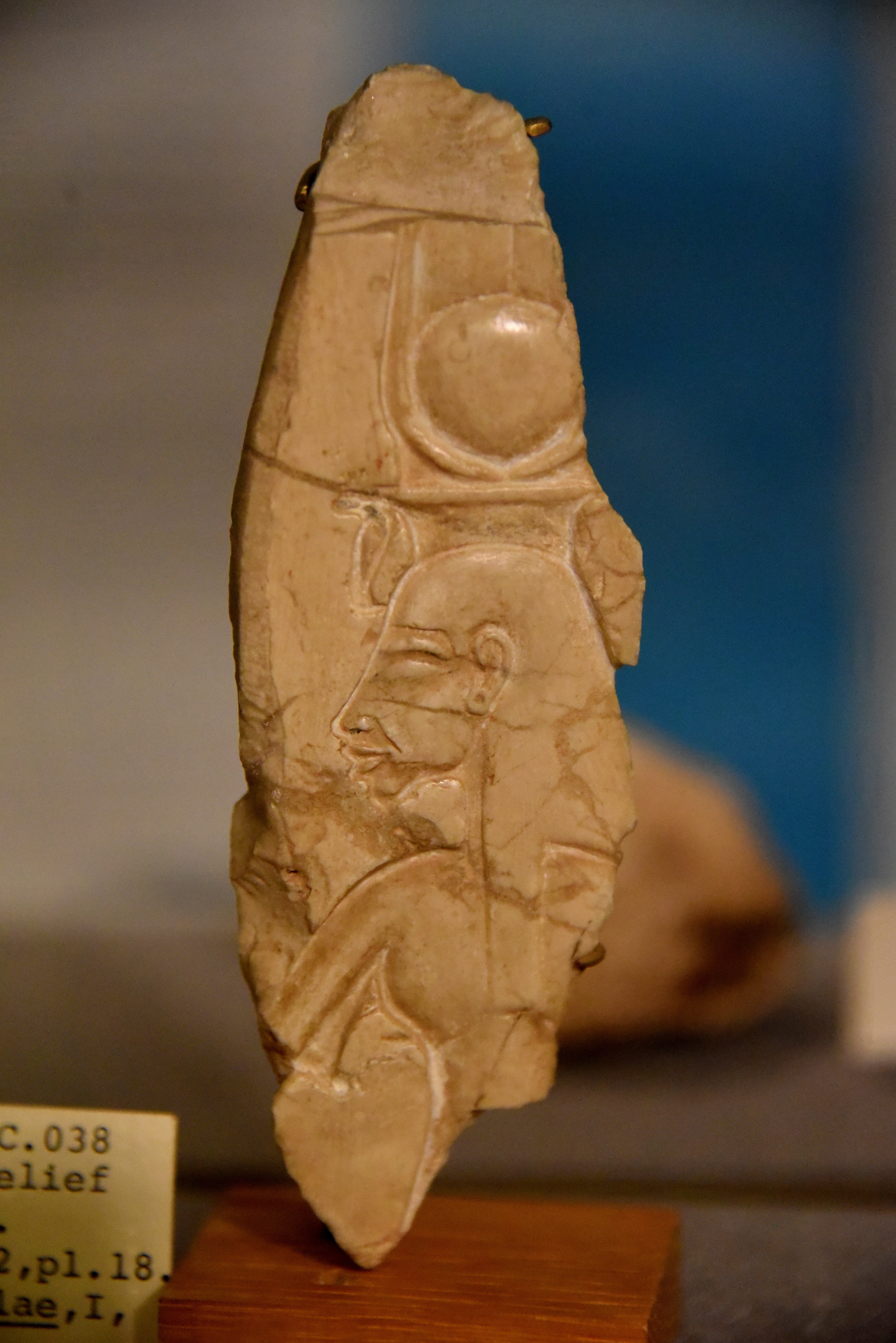
Siliceous limestone fragment relief of Nefertiti. Extreme style of portrait. Reign of Akhenaten, probably early Amarna Period. From Amarna, Egypt. The Petrie Museum of Egyptian Archaeology, London

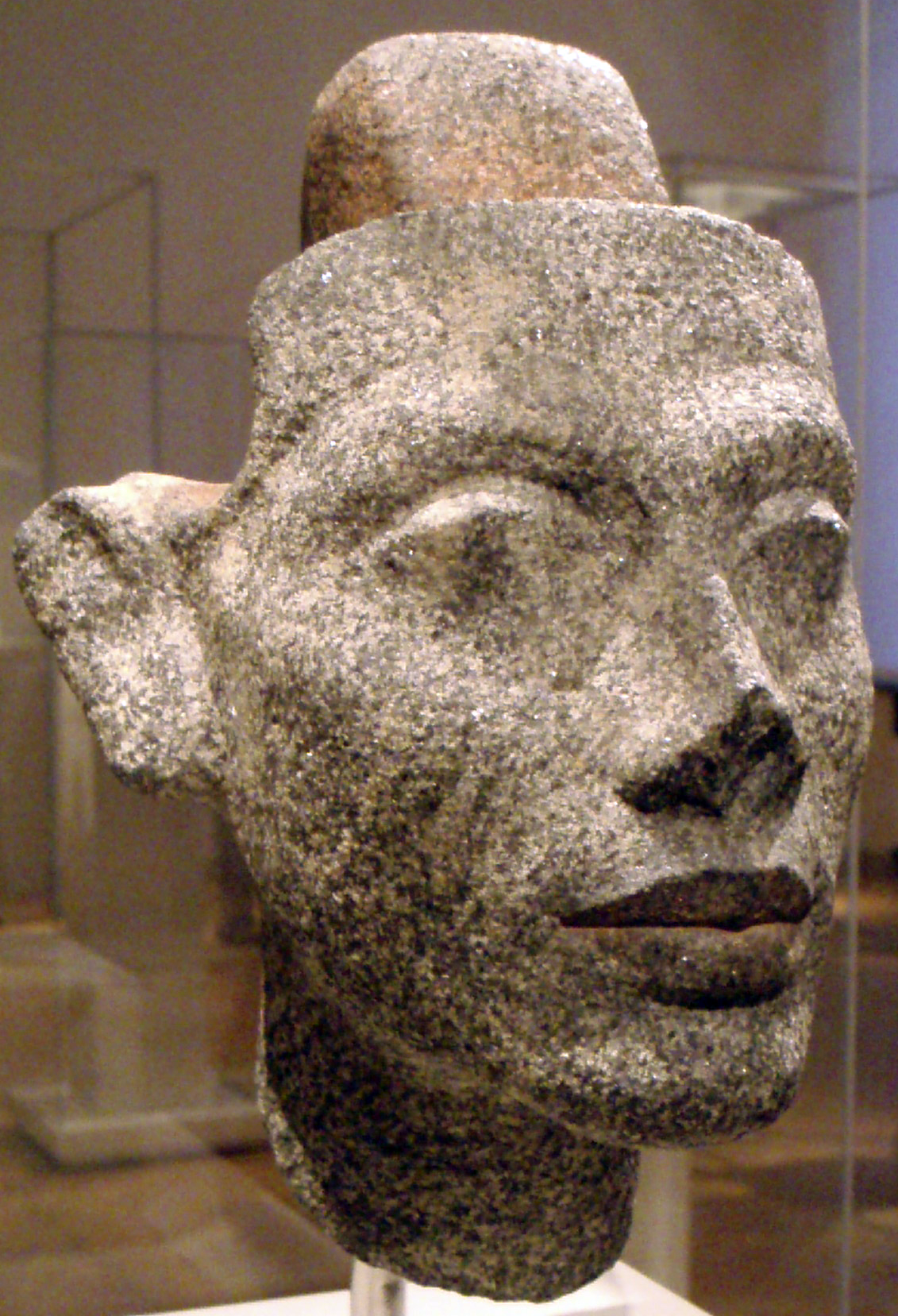
Granite head statue of Nefertiti. The securing post at head apex allows for different hairstyles to adorn the head. Altes Museum, Berlin.

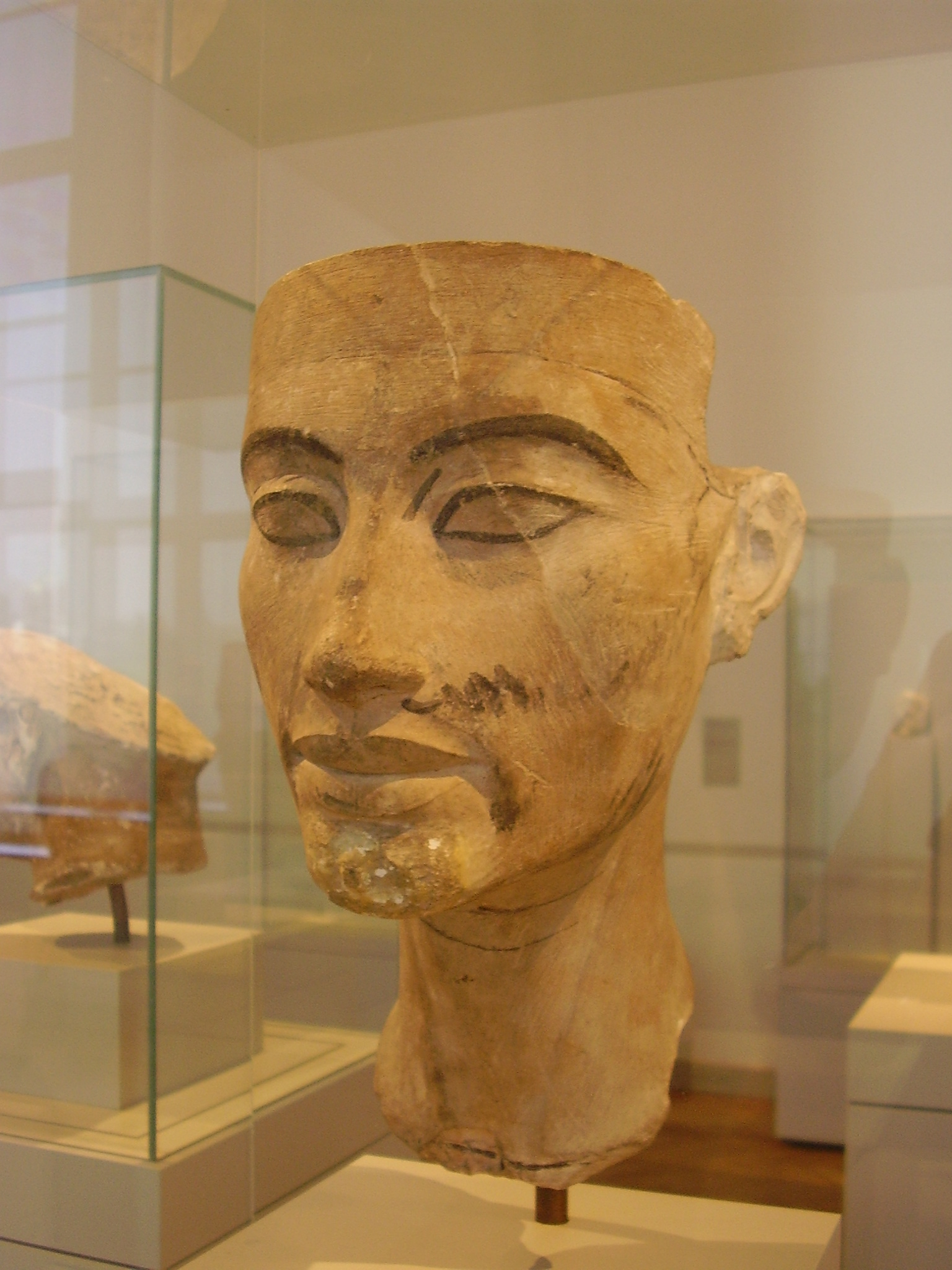
Head statue of Nefertiti, Altes Museum, Berlin.

Akhenaten, Nefertiti and their daughters before the Aten. Stela of Akhenaten and his family, Egyptian Museum, Cairo.

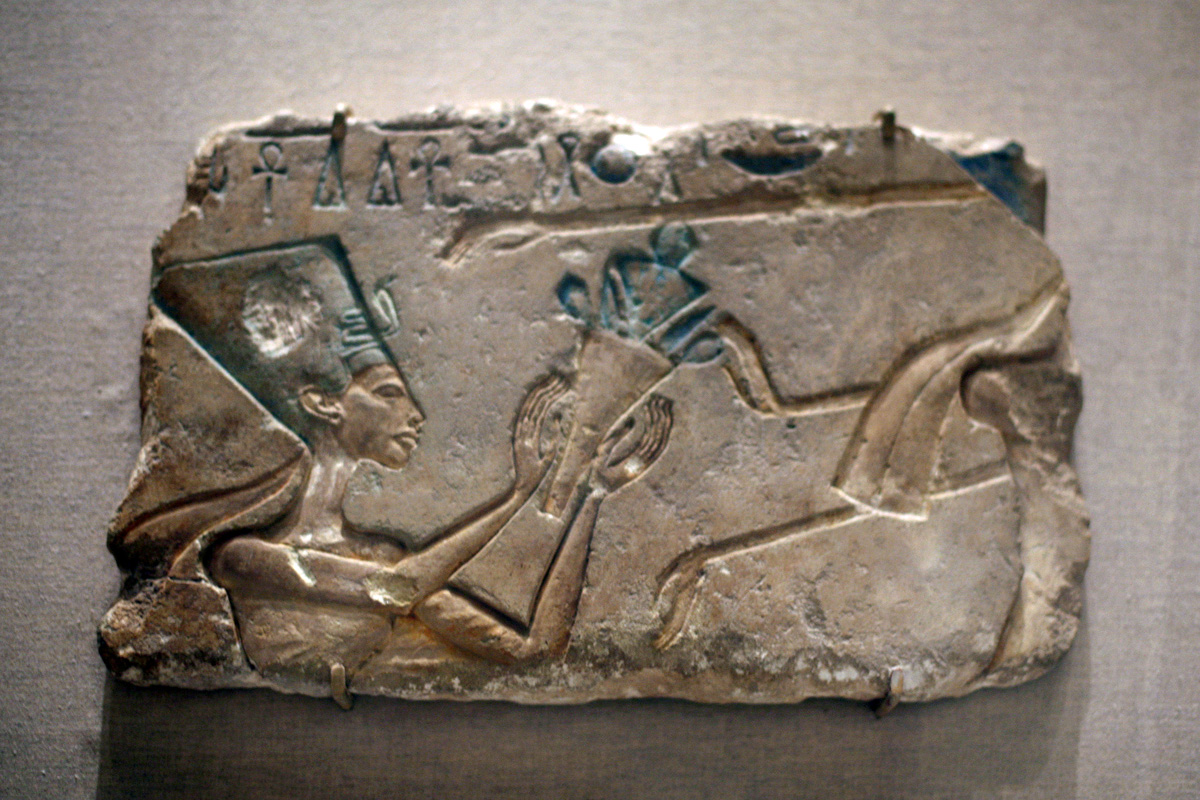
Nefertiti offering oil to the Aten. Brooklyn Museum.

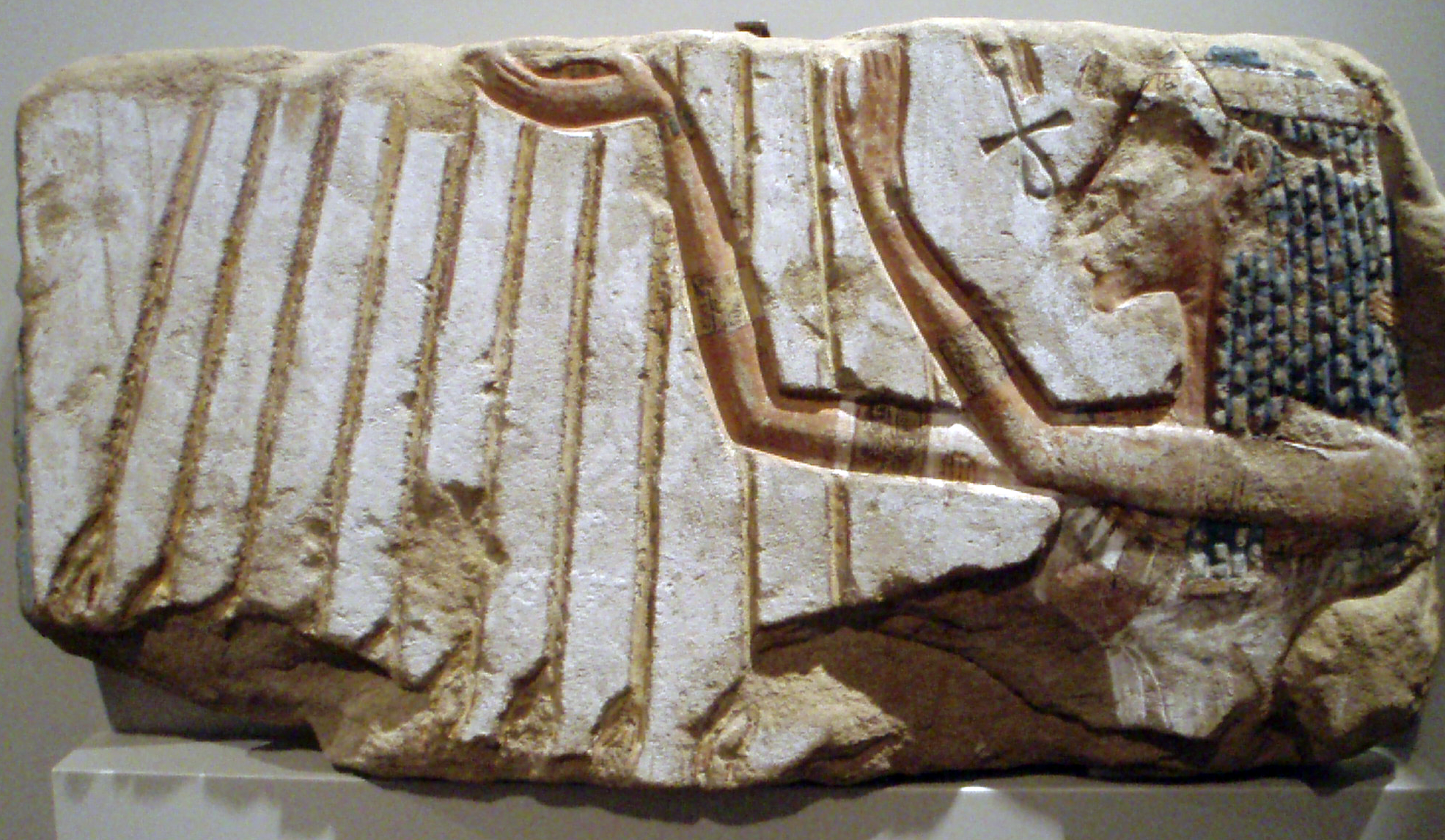
Talatat showing Nefertiti worshipping the Aten. Altes Museum.

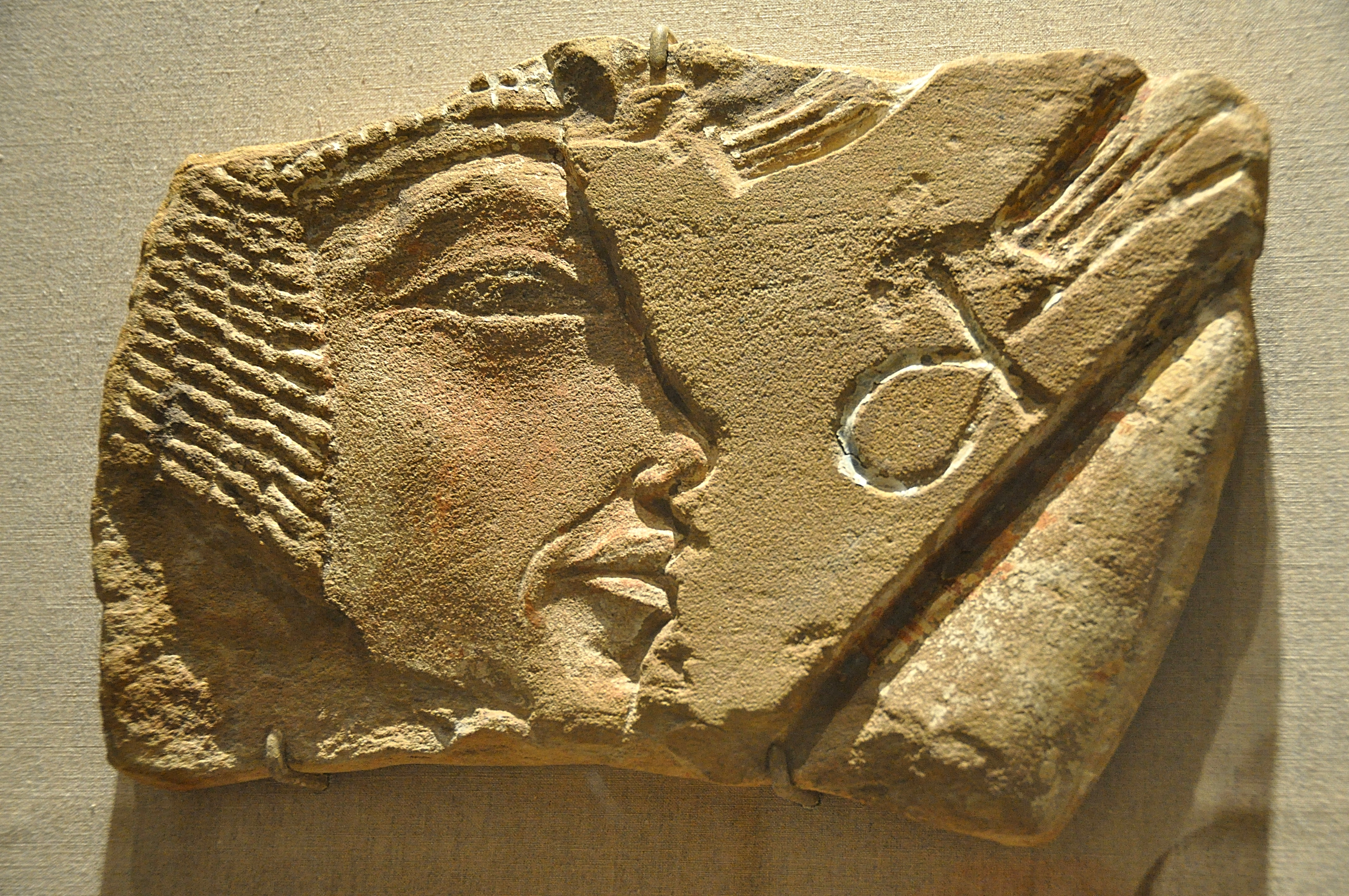
Relief fragment with Nefertiti, Brooklyn Museum.

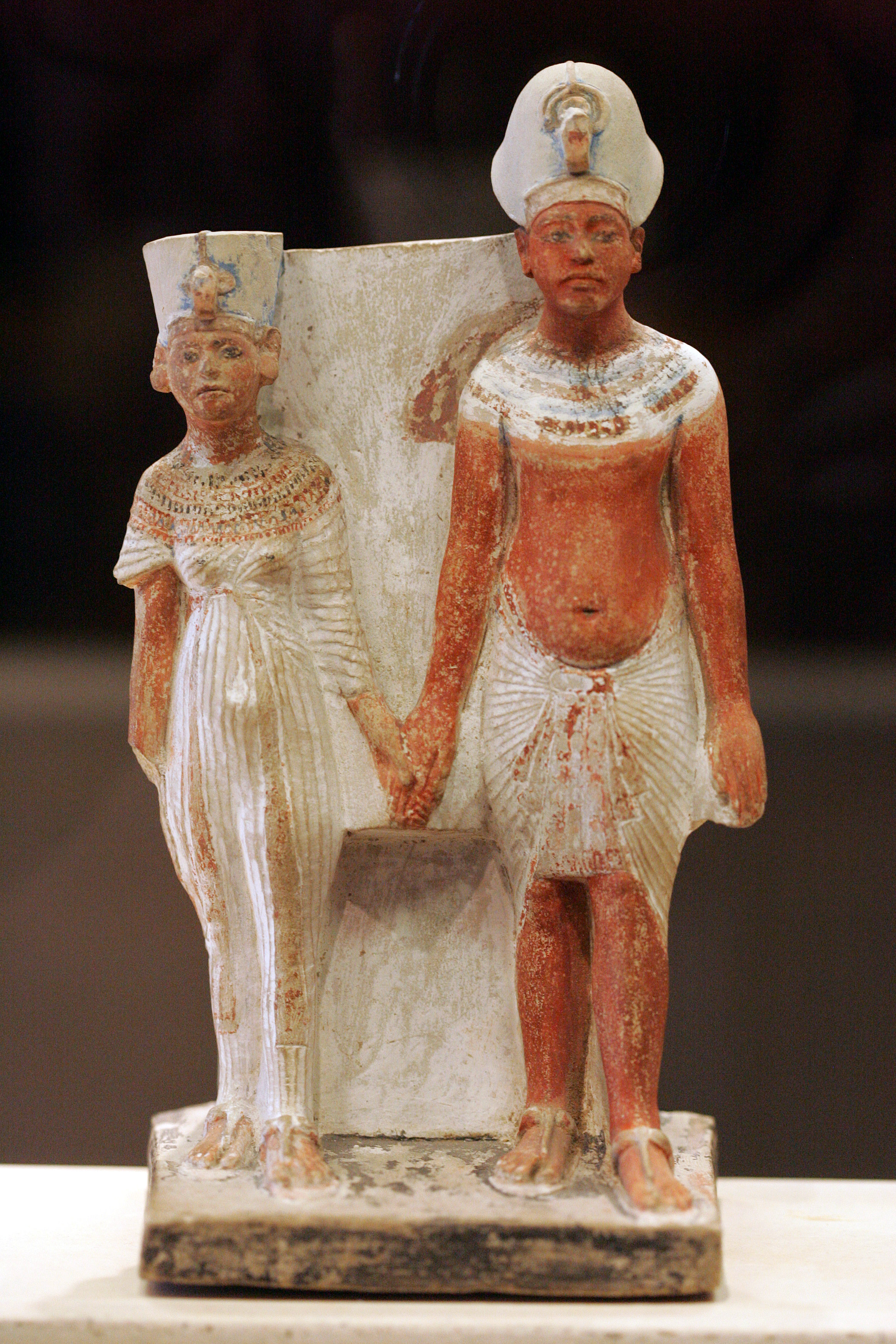
Akhenaten and Nefertiti. Louvre Museum, Paris.

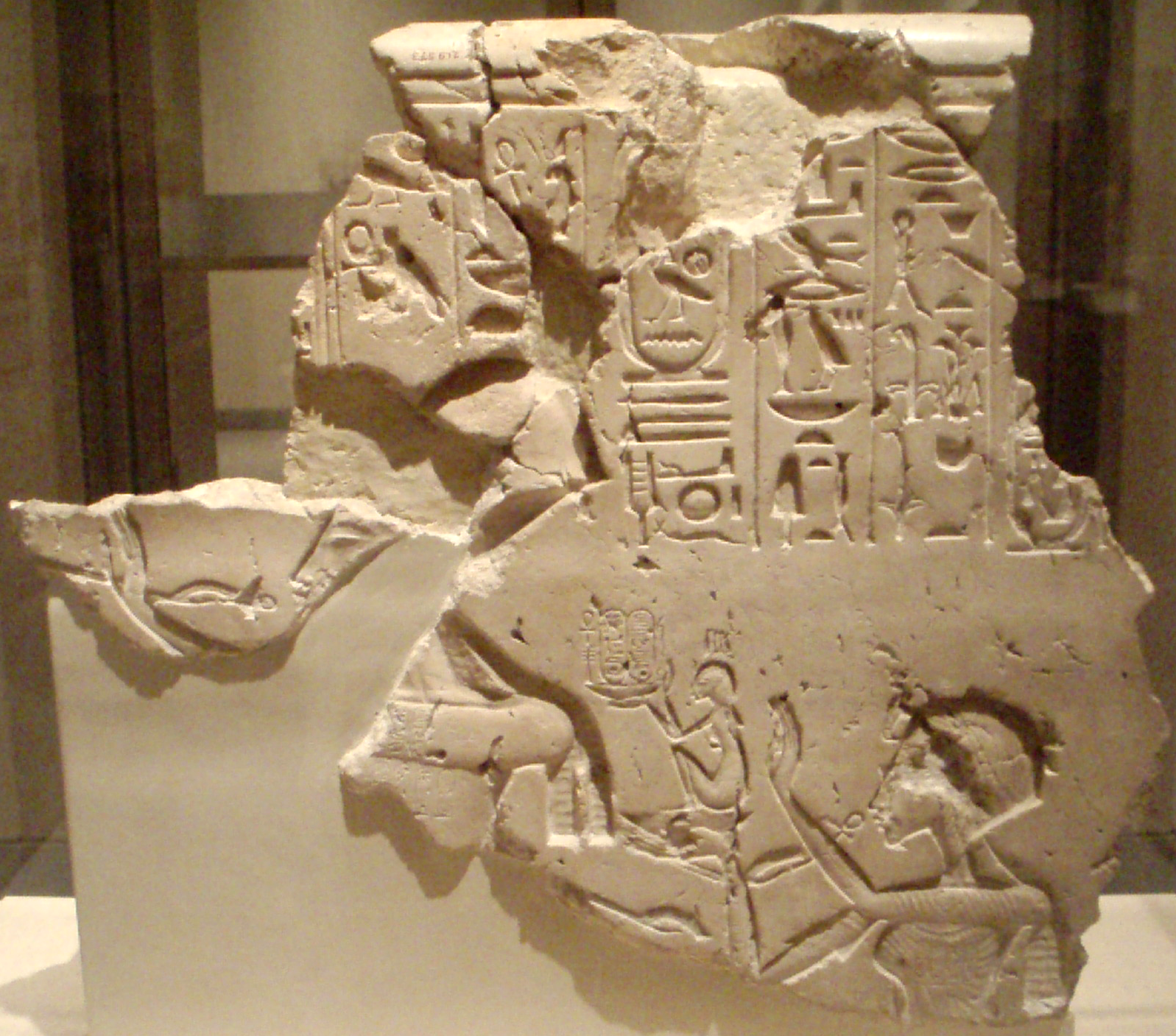
Nefertiti presenting an image of the goddess Maat to the Aten. Brooklyn Museum.

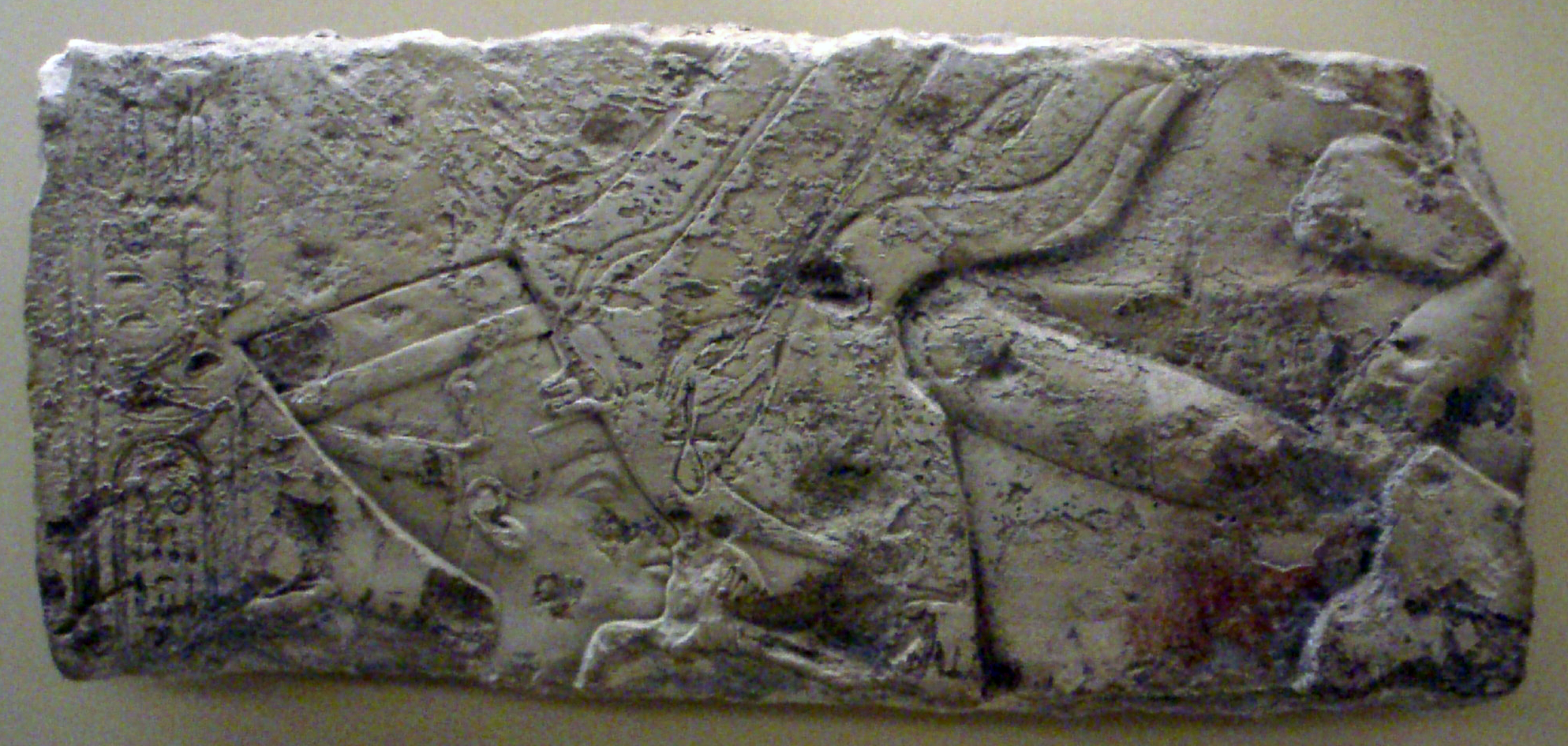
Talatat representing Nefertiti and Akhenaten worshipping the Aten. Royal Ontario Museum.

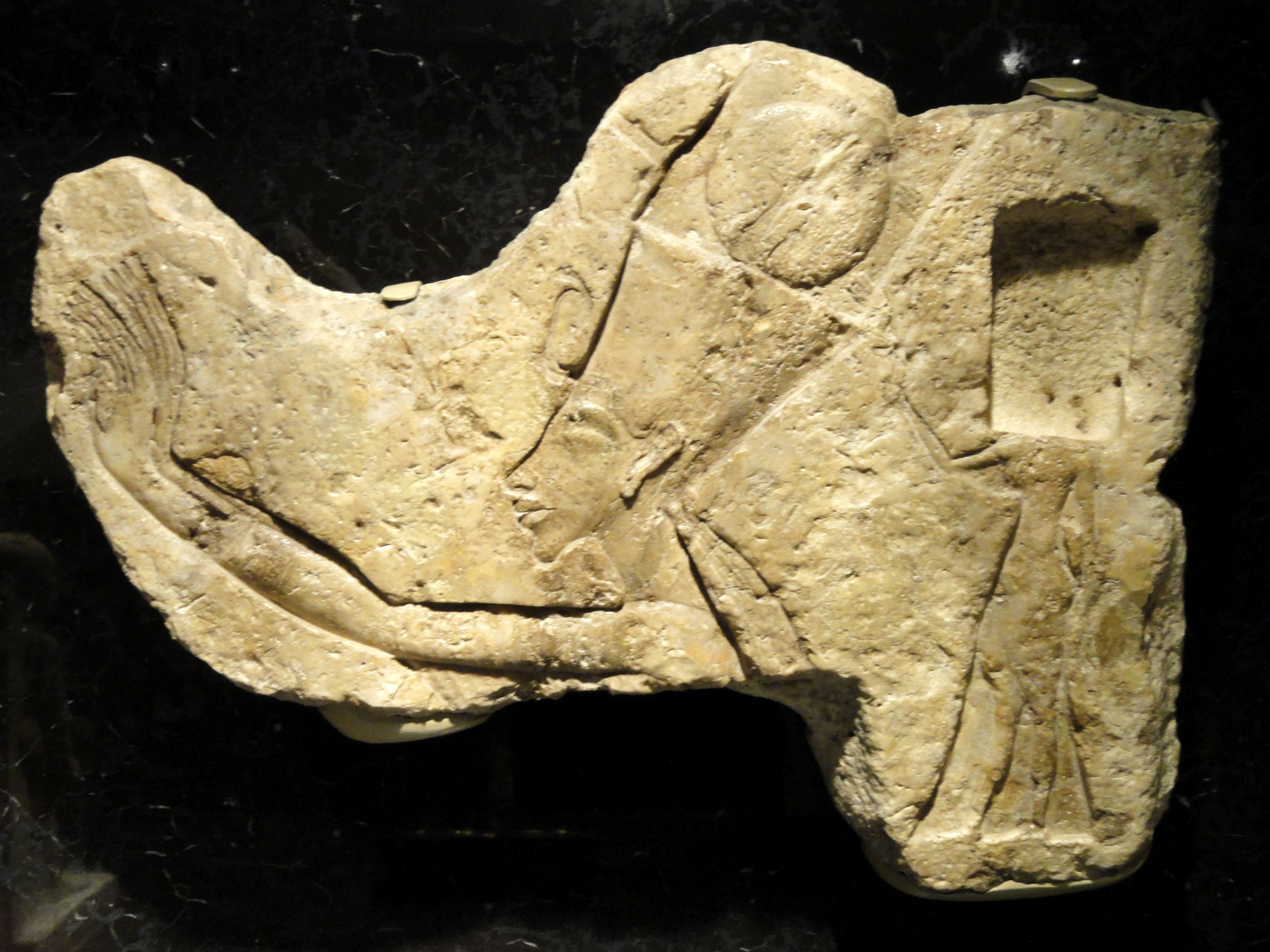
Boundary stele of Amarna with Nefertiti and her daughter, princess Meketaten, Nelson-Atkins Museum of Art.

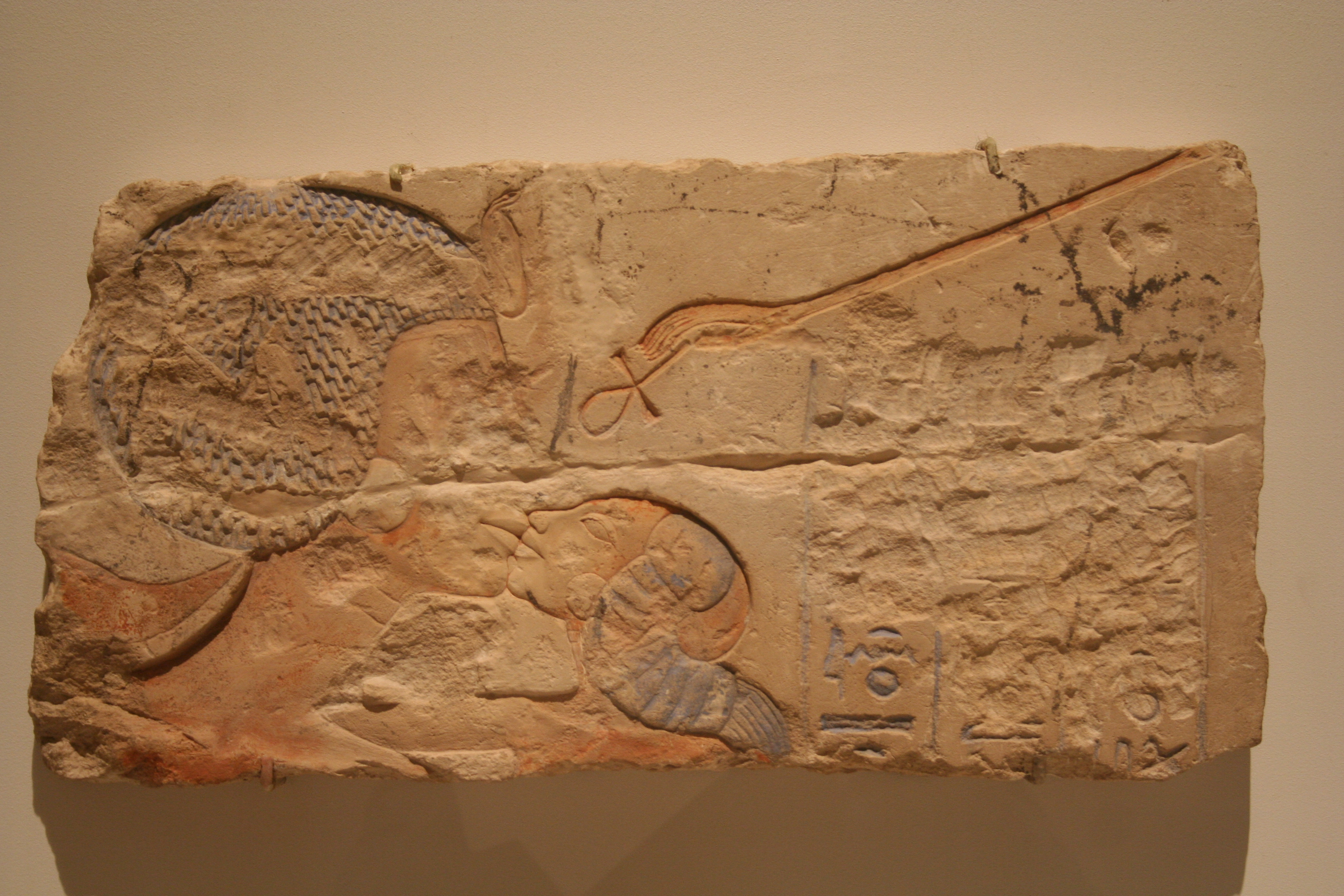
Limestone relief of Nefertiti kissing one of her daughters, Brooklyn Museum.

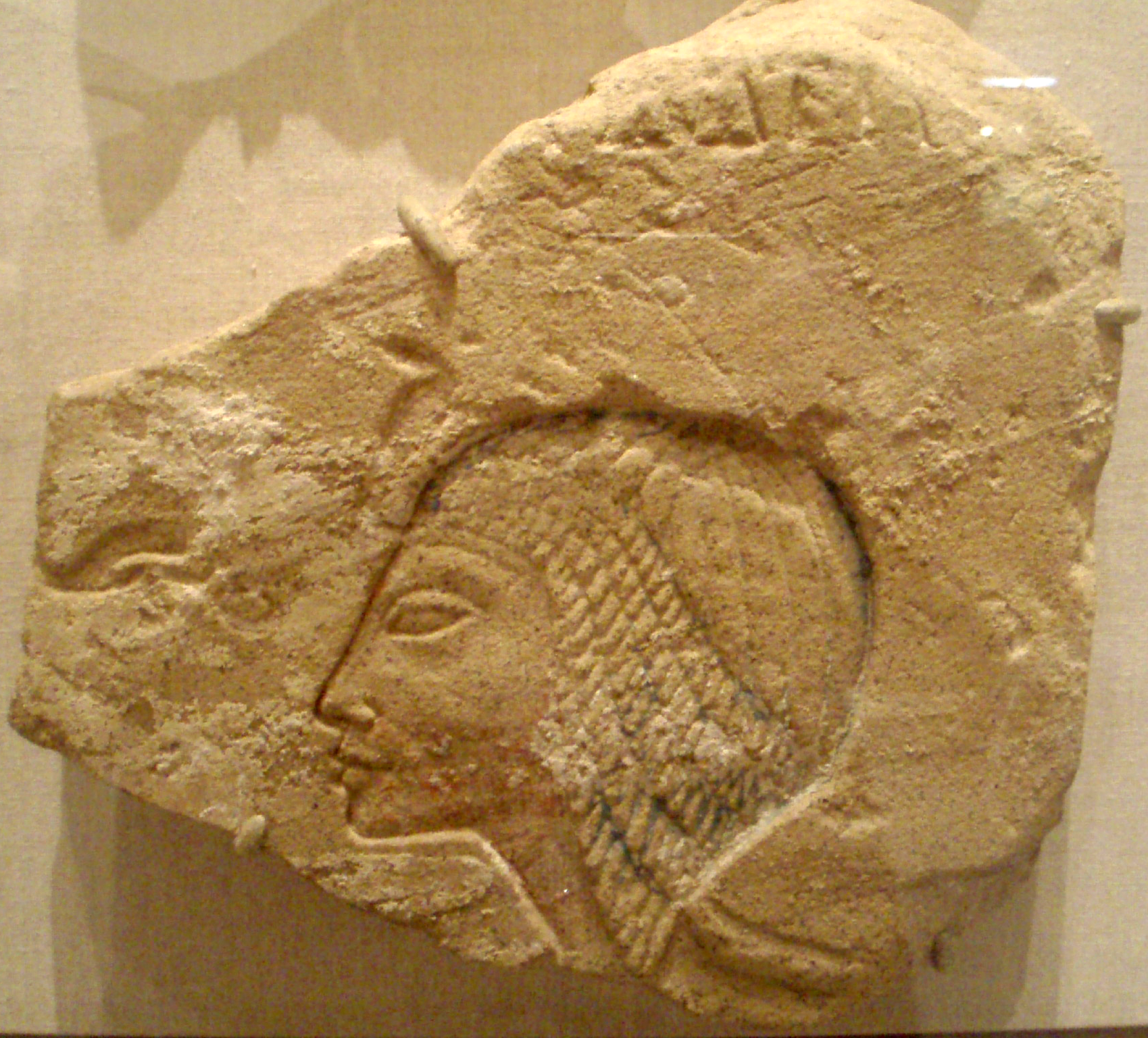
Talatat with an aged Nefertiti, Brooklyn Museum.

== Cultural depictions ==
- Nefertiti was portrayed by Geraldine Chaplin in Nefertiti and Akhenaton (1973), Mexican short film by Raul Araiza.
- Nefertiti was portrayed again by Riann Steele in Doctor Who (2012), in the episode "Dinosaurs on a Spaceship".
- Nefertiti (presented as the same person as Neferneferuaten) is a key part of the archaeological topics in Jacqueline Benson's 2024 historical fantasy novel, Tomb of the Sun King.
- Nefertiti is described in the song "Nefertiti, Sun Goddess" (written by Leo-Neferuaten Boyle and Sovra Wilson-Dickson in December 1998). The song appeared on Leo-Neferuaten Boyle's studio recorded demo album The Aten Shines Again in October 2002 and a YouTube video of the song was created in November 2012.
- Nefertiti is described as the sister of the Mittani Crown Prince in the Red River (1995-2002) (and 2026 anime) which also features Hittite prince Zannanza, son of King Suppililiuma.
