= Northern Palace (Amarna) =

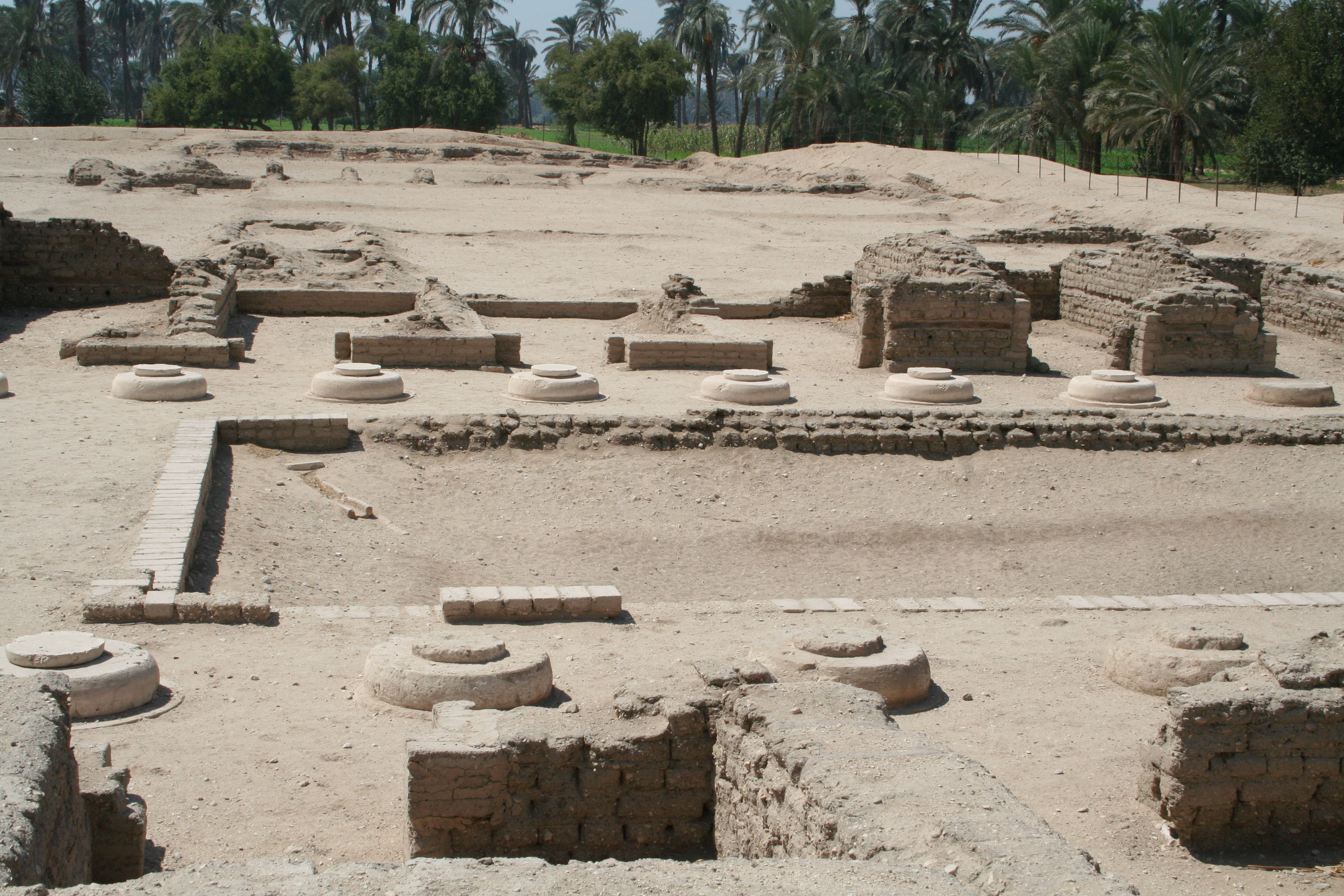
- The remains of the North Palace in 2006
- 27°40′12″N 30°54′12″E
- Type: Palace
- Location: Minya, Egypt

History
- Built: c. 1350 BC

Site notes
- Material: Limestone

The Northern Palace, also called the North Palace, is located in the abandoned Northern Suburbs of the city of Ahketaten (modern Amarna, in Egypt). This palace should not be confused with the North Riverside Palace further north in Amarna.

The Northern Palace is situated between the North Suburb and the North City of Amarna. It is an isolated building facing west to the river and oriented perpendicularly with respect to an extension of the Royal Road. The rectangular structure is arranged around a large open space. On one end of the open space is a throne-room complex. The complex included a pillared hall and a stone built balcony. Next to that area was the private bedroom and bathroom.

To the north of the throne room is a garden court with rooms for personal servants. The staff may have included the unguent preparer Ramose known from two letters that place in Meritaten's household. To the south of the throne-room are further servant quarters. On one side of the open center is and area that was used to house animals. The mangers were decorated with images of cattle, ibexes and antelopes. The structure featured limestone feeding troughs and mangers combined with tethering stones.

The palace is well known for its decorations. Many of the decorations were found in their original position. Common themes include papyrus plants growing in a swampy environment with birds and butterflies.

The residence was initially the home of one of Amenhotep IV's queens. It had been proposed that the palace was the home of the Great Royal Wife Nefertiti, and that the palace was later given as the primary residence of the eldest royal daughter Meritaten. In recent times however it has become clear that the palace was the home of Queen Kiya, and that after her death the palace became the residence of Meritaten.
