= Dakhamunzu =

Egyptian queen

Dakhamunzu (properly Daḫamunzu) is the name of an Egyptian queen known from the Hittite annals The Deeds of Suppiluliuma, which were composed by Suppiluliuma I's son Mursili II. The identity of this queen has not yet been established with any degree of certainty and Dakhamunzu has variously been identified as either Nefertiti, Meritaten or Ankhesenamen. The identification of this queen is of importance both for Egyptian chronology and for the reconstruction of events during the late Eighteenth Dynasty.

However, in recent years it has been noted that Dahamunzu may be the Hittite phonetic rendition of the Egyptian ta hemet nesu, 'the king's wife', and thus is simply the equivalent of addressing her as the equivalent of 'queen'. If so, then Dahamanzu is not a proper name at all and thus not a mysterious synonym for any of the queens discussed here, and is instead only a title. See below on this page.

The episode in The Deeds of Suppiluliuma that features Dakhamunzu is often referred to as the Zannanza affair, after the name of a Hittite prince who was sent to Egypt to marry her.

== Context ==
The Dakhamunzu episode should be seen against the background of Egypt's relations with the other major powers in Western Asia during the second half of the 14th century BC, more specifically the three-cornered struggle for power between Egypt, Mitanni and the newly arising power of the Hittites under Suppiluliuma I. During the late-Amarna period and its immediate aftermath we are almost totally dependent on the Hittite records for information on these matters.

While involved in war with Mitanni, the Hittites were attacked by Egyptian forces in the region of Kadesh, which had only recently come under Hittite control. Suppiluliuma retaliated by simultaneously besieging Mitanni forces at Carchemish and sending forces into the Amqu region, at that time an Egyptian vassal state. At this point the annals inform us that:

[The Egyptians] were afraid. And since, in addition, their lord Nibhururiya had died, therefore the queen of Egypt, who was Dakhamunzu, sent a messenger to [Suppiluliuma].

== The Zannanza affair ==
The annals then recount the message the Egyptian widow queen wrote to Suppiluliuma:

My husband died. A son I have not. But to thee, they say, the sons are many. If thou wouldst give me one son of thine, he would become my husband. Never shall I pick out a servant of mine and make him my husband. I am afraid.

Such an offer to marry a female member of the Egyptian royal family is unprecedented; as Amenhotep III made clear in his correspondence with a foreign king, the gift of women in marriage was, for Egypt, a one-way trade: From time immemorial no daughter of the king of Egypt is given to anyone. Suppiluliuma is therefore surprised and suspicious, the annals report his reaction:

Such a thing has never happened to me in my whole life!

Intrigued, he sends his chamberlain to Egypt to investigate the matter. He orders him:

Go and bring thou the true word back to me! Maybe they deceive me! Maybe (in fact) they do have a son of their lord!

In the meantime, Suppiluliuma concludes the siege of Carchemish, then returns to his capital Hattusa for the winter. The following spring his chamberlain and a messenger from Egypt return to him, bringing a further letter of the queen:

Why didst thou say “they deceive me” in that way? Had I a son, would I have written about my own and my country's shame to a foreign land? Thou didst not believe me and hast even spoke thus to me! He who was my husband has died. A son I have not! Never shall I take a servant of mine and make him my husband! I have written to no other country, only to thee have I written! They say thy sons are many: so give me one son of thine! To me he will be husband, but to Egypt he will be king.

Suppiluliuma however remains suspicious and he tells the Egyptian messenger:

...You keep asking me for a son of mine (as if it were my) duty. [H]e will in some way become a hostage, but [king] you will not make him!

Nevertheless, after further negotiations with the Egyptian messenger and consultation of an earlier peace treaty between the Hittites and Egypt, Suppiluliuma agrees to send one of his sons to Egypt. But this prince, named Zannanza, is killed, possibly before he even reaches Egypt. As the annals make clear, the Hittites accuse the Egyptians for this murder:

They spoke thus: "The people of Egypt killed Zannanza and brought word: ‘Zannanza died!’ And when [Suppiluliuma] heard of the slaying of Zannanza, he began to lament for Zannanza and to the gods he spoke thus: 'Oh gods! I did no evil, yet the people of Egypt did this to me, and they also attacked the frontier of my country".

This leads to recriminations on behalf of Suppiluliuma, who again attacks Amqu, drives the Egyptians from it, and returns with prisoners to Hattusa.

== Aftermath ==
Nothing is told of the eventual fate of Dakhamunzu, but the draft for a letter written by Suppiluliuma might shed more light on the matter. This letter is addressed to an unnamed pharaoh, generally considered Ay, written in response to an earlier letter from this pharaoh to Suppiluliuma. From this correspondence, it appears that this pharaoh came to the throne of Egypt at some time before the murder of Zannanza, and that Suppiluliuma seems to have been unaware of this development at the Egyptian court at the time he sent his son there. This new pharaoh might be seen either as a servant to whom Dakhamunzu was married against her own wish or as supplanting her on the throne, depending on the identification of the individuals involved (see below).

The deaths of both Suppiluliuma and his immediate successor Arnuwanda II are a direct result of the Zannanza affair because both succumbed to a plague brought to Hattusa by the prisoners from Amqu.

== Identification of the Egyptian protagonists ==
Initially, the name Dakhamunzu was believed to be a misreading of Sankhamun, a supposed version of Ankhesenamun, Tutankhamun's widow. However, it has been demonstrated that Dakhamunzu is a Hittite rendering of the Egyptian title ta hemet nesu (Egyptian: tꜣ ḥmt nswt, literally "the king's wife", probably pronounced contemporaneously as /tə ˈħiːmaʔ ʔənˈsiːʔəʔ/) instead of the name of a queen. As a consequence Dakhamunzu has variously been identified as either Nefertiti, Meritaten or Ankhesenamun.

Nibhururiya, the name of the recently deceased pharaoh as it is recorded in the annals, has been seen as a Hittite rendering of the prenomen of either Akhenaten (Neferkheperure) or Tutankhamun (Nebkheperure) and the flexibility of the chronology of the period admits both possibilities. The chronology of events requires that the death of Nibhururiya occurs near the end of Suppiluliuma's life and therefore conventional Egyptian chronology favours Tutankhamun. Linguistic analysis has demonstrated that 'Nibḫururiya' is an accurate Hittite rendering of Tutankhamun's throne name Nebkheperure. In addition, the Amarna letters, which contain Diplomatic correspondence between Egypt and its neighbors, always refer to Akhenaten as 'Napḫurureya' (Hittite rendering of Akhenaten's throne name Neferkheperure) in letters received from the Hittites, further supporting evidence that 'Nibḫururiya' is referring to Tutankhamun. It is also assumed that the situation at the Egyptian court (i.e. the lack of male royal offspring) fits better with the period after Tutankhamun's death. In this case Dakhamunzu should be identified as Ankhesenamun, while the anonymous pharaoh from Suppiluliuma's draft letter can be identified as Ay, a servant Dakhamunzu did not want to marry.

Alternative Egyptian and Hittite chronologies based on recorded astronomical phenomena make Akhenaten a more likely candidate for Nibhururiya, although Smenkhkare cannot be entirely ruled out due to their prenomen being missing. Comparison between the probable times of death for Akhenaten (after the vintaging of wine, i.e. at the end of September or the start of October) and Tutankhamun (in December, based on floral and faunal evidence from his tomb) with the account found in the Hittite annals (which places the reception of Dakhamunzu's first letter in late autumn) also seems to favour the identification of Nibhururiya with Akhenaten. Further evidence to support this identification might come from one of the Amarna letters which seems to deal with the same military actions against Amqu that are reported in the Hittite annals. Since the Amarna archives seem to have been abandoned and closed by the end of Tutankhamun's reign, the presence of this letter there suggests he cannot have been the recently deceased pharaoh from the annals. The recently proposed identification of an Egyptian official named Armaa, who appears in a Hittite document relating events from Mursili II's regnal years 7 and 9, as Horemheb in his function of viceroy and commander in Asia (i.e. before his ascent to the throne) would also rule out Tutankhamun as possible candidate for Nibhururiya.

The identification of Nibhururiya as Akhenaten does however complicate the identity of Dakhamunzu because besides his great royal wife Nefertiti, Meritaten seems to have held the title ta hemet nesu in relation to her father as well. In this case, the identity of Dakhamunzu is largely depended on the identity of Akhenaten's co-regent and successor. Those who see evidence for a gradually changing role for Nefertiti (from great royal wife, over co-regent to sole ruler after Akhenaten's death) will naturally identify Dakhamunzu as Nefertiti, and see the Zannanza affair as further evidence for Nefertiti's continuing importance in the late-Amarna period. In this case it is believed that, in spite of her changed role at the Egyptian court, to the outside world she would have remained known as the king's wife. Supporters of this theory draw a parallel between the co-rule between Hatshepsut and Tuthmosis III earlier in the 18th dynasty, and a possible co-regency between Nefertiti and Tutankhamun. In such a scenario, Tutankhamun may be identified as the unnamed pharaoh from Suppiluliuma's letter, supplanting Nefertiti on the Egyptian throne. Others, however, maintain that Nefertiti predeceased her husband and therefore identify Dakhamunzu/Akhenaten's female co-regent as Meritaten. In this scenario, Smenkhare may be identified as the new unnamed pharaoh, who would then be the servant Dakhamunzu was unwilling to marry, although the identification of Smenkhkare as Zannanza is also suggested as a (more unlikely) possibility. In the event that Smenkhkare was Nibhururiya, Meritaten is again identified as Dakhamunzu.

== Notes and references ==
=== Bibliography ===
- Aldred, C., Akhenaten, King of Egypt (Thames and Hudson, 1988).
- Güterbock, H.G., "The Deeds of Suppiluliuma as told by his son, Mursilli II", Journal of Cuneiform Studies, 10 (1956).
- Reeves, C.N., Akhenaten, Egypt's False Prophet (Thames and Hudson, 2001).
- Christoffer Theis: Der Brief der Königin Daḫamunzu an den hethitischen König Šuppiluliuma I. im Lichte von Reisegeschwindigkeiten und Zeitabläufen, in: Thomas R. Kämmerer (Hrsg.): Identities and Societies in the Ancient East-Mediterranean Regions. Comparative Approaches. Henning Graf Reventlow Memorial Volume (= AAMO 1, AOAT 390/1). Münster 2011, S. 301–331

== See also ==
- Foreign relations of Egypt during the Amarna period
