= North Riverside Palace =

Royal residence in Amarna, Egypt

The North Riverside Palace was a royal residence in the former Egyptian city of Amarna. This palace should not be confused with the North Palace, which was the residence of first Queen Kiya and later Meritaten. Although the North Palace is nearby and is surrounded by several organically expanding towns.

== The Palace ==
The North Riverside palace was the first building one would encounter when entering the city of Amarna from the north. This residence was located about 3 km north of the Central City. This palace complex was likely the main residence of Pharaoh Akhenaten and his family.

The North Riverside Palace was a large citadel surrounded by an enclosing wall. The palace was first excavated in the 1930, but the change in the way that the river runs has washed away a lot of the foundations of the palace. The enclosing wall however was preserved to some extent and shows a 1.5 m (4 ft 11 in) thick wall that had square towers incorporated at regular intervals. A palace of this size likely included gardens. One gateway was excavated and parts of plaster were discovered showing a Pharaoh in a chariot. It is not clear if this Pharaoh was Akhenaten or one of his successors.

== The Royal Progress ==
The royal residences and sunshades such as the Maru-Aten were widely dispersed. Scenes in the Rock Tombs of Amarna show the royal family traveling by chariot. If the main residence was the North Riverside Palace, the family may have traveled along the Royal Road to the other sites at Amarna.
