= Zannanza =

Hittite prince

Zannanza (died c. 1324 BC) was a Hittite prince, son of Suppiluliuma I, king of the Hittites. He is best known for almost becoming the pharaoh of Egypt, but his disappearance under mysterious circumstances caused a diplomatic incident between the Hittites and Egyptian Empire, resulting in a war that ultimately resulted in the death of Suppiluliuma by an unknown plague and a long-lived rivalry between Egypt and the Hittites.

His disappearance is the earliest recorded case of a missing person.

== Biography ==
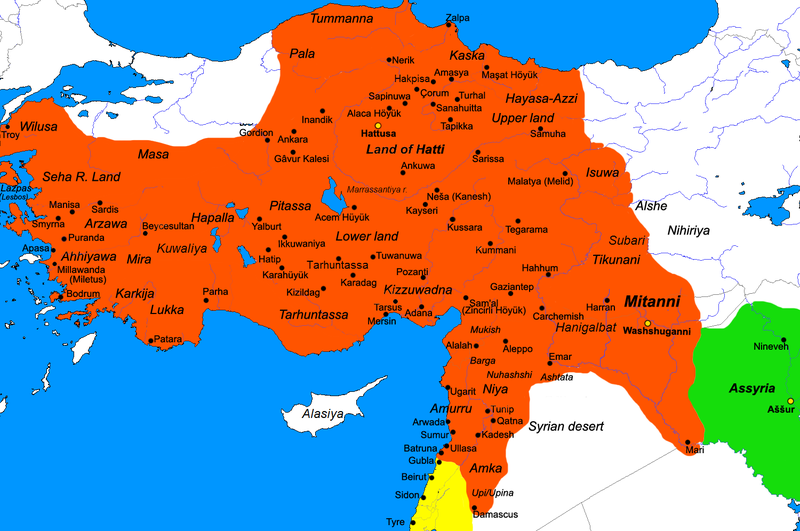
Borders of the Hittite Empire under Suppiluliuma I(c.1350–1322)

Zannanza was born to king Suppilulliuma I and possibly his first wife Henti. He was likely born in the capital of Hattusa after the Hittite prince Arnuwanda II, who was the heir to their father. He also had at least three other brothers including Telipinu, Piyassili, and Muršili II. He additionally had an unknown number of sisters.

After an offer of marriage from an Egyptian queen identified to be Ankhesenamun, he was sent by his father to accept the proposal but went missing before reaching Egypt. It is unknown if he had any children or wives prior to this incident.

== The Zannanza Affair ==
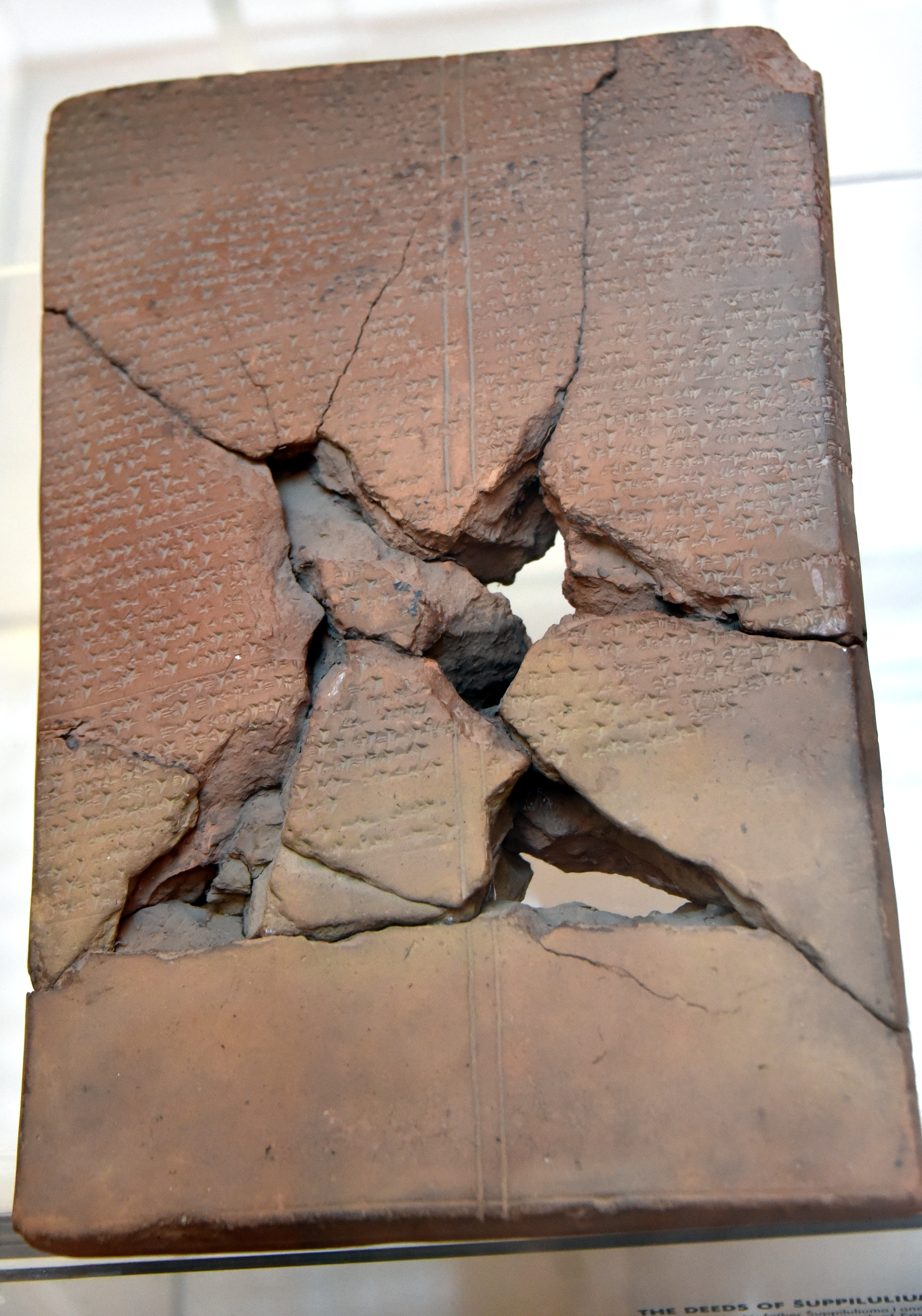
Clay tablet of Deeds of Suppiluliuma I. 14th century BC, from Hattusa

The Egyptian Queen Dakhamunzu, who could have been Meritaten or Nefertiti, but is most often identified as Ankhesenamun, asked Suppiluliuma I to send one of his sons during the late Eighteenth Dynasty of Egypt because she had recently been widowed by the death of Nibhururia (possibly Akhenaten, but more likely Tutankhamun), and had borne no heir. As noted in the Deeds of Suppiluliuma Tablet by his son Mursili, her letter reads,

"My husband died. A son I have not. But to thee they say, the sons are many. If thou wouldst give me one son of thine, he would become my husband. Never shall I pick out a servant of mine and make him my husband! I am afraid!"

It was extraordinary that a consort from outside of Egypt would be sought, given Egyptian women of the royal family were never married to foreigners, so Suppiluliuma was skeptical. After sending an envoy expressing his doubts to the sincerity of the offer, she sent another letter stating,

"Why didst thou say 'they deceive me' in that way? Had I a son, would I have written about my own and my country's shame to a foreign land? Thou didst not believe me and hast even spoken thus to me! He who was my husband has died. A son I have not! Never shall I take a servant of mine and make him my husband! I have written to no other country only to thee have I written. They say thy sons are many: so give me one son of thine! To me he will be husband, but in Egypt he will be king."

At the prospect of one of his sons gaining the throne of one of their primary rivals and the possibility of uniting the two empires, he chose to oblige her request. His son, Zannanza, was chosen and sent to Egypt to become the new pharaoh. However, the Hittite prince never made it past the Egyptian border, though exactly what became of him and how he died is unknown.

His father accused the Egyptians of murdering him. The new king of Egypt, Ay, denied the murder, but acknowledged the death. Angry letters were passed between the two nations, but the matter ended inconclusively. Hittite forces subsequently attacked Egyptian settlements in Syria. Sick prisoners of war brought back to the Hittite Empire after these attacks caused a deadly epidemic that spread rapidly throughout the empire. As a result, Suppiluliuma I himself died from the epidemic.

While the prevailing theory is that Ay had him killed on his way to Egypt, it is possible Horemheb had a hand in the assassination. He was the commander-in-chief of the army during the time of Tutenkamen and Ay, possibly Ay's son in law, and would have also directly benefited from Zannanza's death since he would succeed Ay approximately five years later. However, any theories are treated with a grain of salt due to a lack of evidence on the truth of the matter.

== Consequences of death ==
While relations between Egypt and the Hittites had been strained long before the death of Zannanza, the subsequent events certainly caused greater militarization by both empires. Shortly after the affair Suppiluliuma would invade Syria, which would bring Egyptian prisoners that were unknowingly ill, and ultimately cause the death of Suppiluliuma. But the hostilities would continue long after the transition from the Eighteenth Dynasty to the Nineteenth Dynasty with the Battle of Kadesh during the reign of Ramesses II. But would later culminate in the Treaty of Kadesh that promised peace and a defensive alliance.

=== Family tree ===
Hittite New Kingdom royal family tree according to Trevor Bryce

Kantuzilli (Note: Scholars have suggested that Tudhaliya I/II was possibly a grandson of the Hittite king Huzziya II; the first Tudhaliya is now known to be the son of Kantuzzili (Bryce 1997, p. 131 suggested Himuili, but the new edition, Bryce 2005, p. 122, indicated Kantuzzili).)
Tudhaliya I/II (Note: Bryce (1997) does not consider it clear whether Tudhaliya I/II was one king or two (p. 133); the link points to Tudhaliya II. Among those who identify distinct kings Tudhaliya I and Tudhaliya II, Freu (2007) has Kantuzzili—his son Tudhaliya I—his son Hattusili II—his son Tudhaliya II (p. 311).)	Nikkalmati (Note: Bryce (1997), p. 139.)
Arnuwanda I	Asmunikal
Hattusili II? (Note: The existence of Hattusili II is doubted by many scholars (Bryce 1997, pp. 153–154; Bryce 2005, p. 141). Among those who accept the existence of Hattusili II, Freu (2007), p. 311, has Tudhaliya I—his son Hattusili II—his son Tudhaliya II.)	Tudhaliya III (Note: Bryce (1997), p. 158.)	Daduhepa (Note: Bryce (1997), p. 172.)	Zida (Note: Bryce (1997), p. 174.)
Tudhaliya the Younger (Note: Bryce (1997), p. 168.)	Henti (1)	Šuppiluliuma I	(2) Tawananna (Note: Also known as Malnigal; daughter of Burnaburias II of Babylonia (Bryce 1997, p. 173).)
Arnuwanda II	Telipinu (Note: ‘Great priest’ in Kizzuwadna and king (lugal) of Aleppo (Bryce 1997, p. 174).)	Sarri-Kusuh (Note: King (lugal) of Carchemish.) (Note: Bryce (1997), pp. 174, 203–204.)	Zannanza (Note: Zannanza died on his way to Egypt to marry a pharaoh's widow, probably Ankhesenpaaten, the widow of Tutankhamun (Bryce 1997, pp. 196–198).)	Gassulawiya (Note: Bryce (1997), p. 227.) (1)	Mursili II	(2) Tanuhepa (Note: Bryce (1997), p. 230.)
Talmi-Sarruma (Note: Bryce (1997), p. 220.)	Sahurunuwa (Note: Bryce (1997), p. 222.)	Muwatalli II	Halpasulupi (Note: Haas (2006), p. 91.)	Massanauzzi (Note: Massanauzzi married Masturi, king of the Seha River Land (Bryce 1997, p. 313).)	Hattusili III (Note: Bryce (1997), p. 296.)	Puduhepa (Note: Puduhepa was the daughter of the Kizzuwadnan priest Pentipsarri (Bryce 1997, p. 273).)
Ini-Tesub (Note: Bryce (1997), pp. 346, 363.)	Urhi-Tesub	Kurunta (Note: King (lugal) of Tarhuntassa (Bryce 1997, p. 296); apparently later Great King of Hatti (Bryce 1997, p. 354).)	Nerikkaili (Note: Nerikkaili married a daughter of Bentesina, king of Amurru (Bryce 1997, p. 294).)	numerous daughters (Note: Two daughters of Hattusili III were married to the pharaoh Ramesses II; one was given the Egyptian name Ma(hor)nefrure. Another, Gassuwaliya, married into the royal house of Amurru. Kilushepa was married to a king of Isuwa. A daughter married into the royal family of Babylon. A sister of Tudhaliya IV married Sausgamuwa, king of Amurru after his father Bentesina. From Bryce (1997), pp. 294 and 312.) and sons (Note: Bryce (1997), p. 332.)	Tudhaliya IV (Note: Bryce (1997), p. 363. Tudhaliya IV probably married a Babylonian princess, known by her title of Great Princess (dumu.sal gal) (Bryce 1997, pp. 294, 331).)
Talmi-Tesub (Note: Bryce (1997), p. 363.)	Arnuwanda III (Note: Bryce (1997), p. 361.)	Suppiluliuma II (Note: Last documented Great King of the Land of Hatti.)
Kuzi-Tesub (Note: King and then Great King of Carchemish (Bryce 1997, pp. 384–385).)

- (1) = 1st spouse
- (2) = 2nd spouse
- Small caps indicates a Great King (LUGAL.GAL) of the Land of Hatti; italic small caps indicates a Great Queen or Tawananna.
- Dashed lines indicate adoption.
- Solid lines indicate marriage (if horizontal) or parentage (if vertical).

References:
- Trevor Bryce (1997). The Kingdom of the Hittites. Oxford, England: Clarendon Press.
- Trevor Bryce (2005). The Kingdom of the Hittites (new edition). Oxford, England: Clarendon Press.
- Trevor Bryce (2012). The World of the Neo-Hittite Kingdoms. Oxford, England: Oxford University Press.
- Jacques Freu (2007). Les débuts du nouvel empire hittite. Paris, France: L'Harmattan.
- Volkert Haas (2006). Die hethitische Literatur. Berlin, Germany: de Gruyter.

== See also ==
- List of people who disappeared mysteriously (pre-1910)

== In fiction ==
- Janet Morris wrote a detailed biographical novel, I, the Sun, whose subject was Suppiluliuma I. Zannanza is an important figure in this novel.
- In the historical fiction manga Red River, Zannanza appeared as a character. Like his inspiration, Zannanza was chosen to become the next Pharaoh after Ankhesenamun sent the letter after Tutankhamun died. While en route to Egypt, he and the rest of his party were ambushed and he was murdered. After the attack, the main character Yuri Suzuki is left alive. She then dissolved any disputes between the two nations whereas in history the Hittites attacked the Egyptian settlements in Syria.
- In the historical fiction novel The Egyptian Zannansa is poisoned on his way to Egypt by the narrator Sinuhe who is sent by Horemheb and the priest Ay who want to prevent the Hittites taking over Egypt.
