= Stela of Akhenaten and his family =

Altar image of a pharaoh and his family

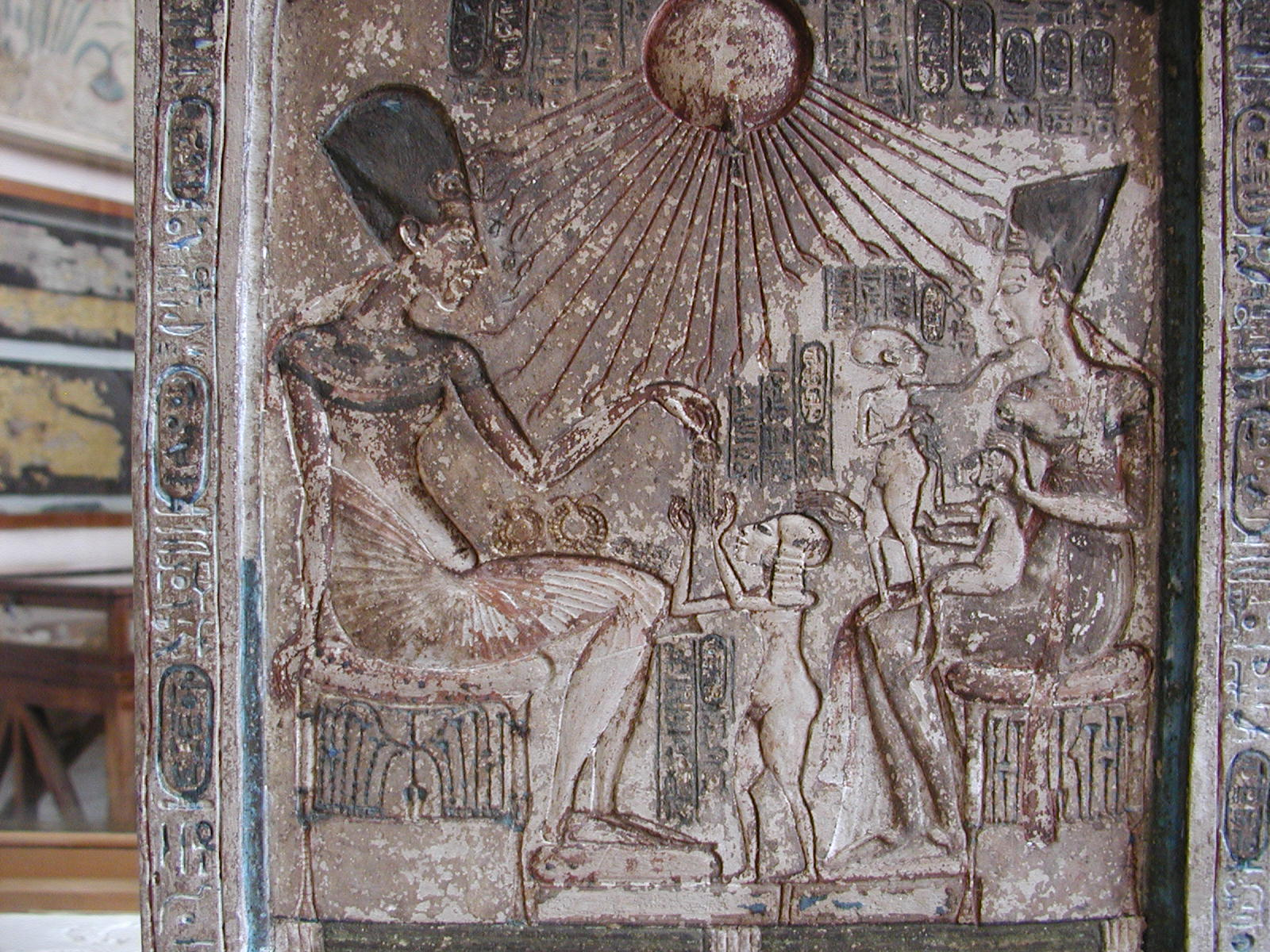
- Material: Limestone
- Length: 39 cm
- Height: 43.5 cm
- Created: c. 1350 BC
- Discovered: 1912; Minya, Egypt
- Discovered by: Ludwig Borchardt
- Present location: Egyptian Museum, Cairo, Egypt
- Identification: JE 44865

The Stela of Akhenaten and his family is the name for an altar image in the Egyptian Museum in Cairo which depicts the Pharaoh Amenhotep IV, his queen consort Nefertiti, and their three children. The limestone stela with the inventory number JE 44865 is 43.5 × 39 cm in size and was discovered by Ludwig Borchardt in Haoue Q 47 at Tell-el Amarna in 1912. When the archaeological finds from Tell-el Amarna were divided on 20 January 1913, Gustave Lefebvre chose this object on behalf of the Egyptian Superintendency for Antiquities (the modern Supreme Council of Antiquities) instead of the Nefertiti Bust.

== Description ==
On the left side, Amenhotep IV sits on a stool, handing a jewel to his eldest daughter, Meritaten, who stands in front of him. Nefertiti sits opposite him, on the right-hand side, playing with two of their daughters on her lap. These are Meketaten and Ankhesenpaaten. In the upper part, in the middle of the stela is the disk of the Aten, whose rays end in hands holding the symbol of life (Ankh) and are thereby depicted as life-bringing. In the background there are various inscriptions with the names and titles of the people depicted. The stela is bordered on three sides by a band of further hieroglyphs, marked with blue paint, which still partially survives. At the base of the stela are small holes on both sides, which indicate that the stela was fitted with wings on each side.

The so-called "doctrinal name" of the Aten used here is still in its first form. The stela's dating to the end of the first half of Akhenaten's reign follows from this, as well as the depiction of the daughters and stylistic features typical of the Amarna period. Such stelae are typical of the Amarna period in Ancient Egypt and are found particularly in the graves at Amarna, which was the capital of Egypt under Akhenaten, with the name Akhetaten. These stelae were altars, which were placed in private chapels or houses for the worship of the royal family and the sun-god Aten.

== Allegations of forgery ==
In an interview for Der Spiegel in 2009 in connection with a claim that the Nefertiti Bust is a forgery, German Egyptologist Rolf Krauss argued that the bust is most likely authentic, while this stela is not. As a basis for his view, Krauss claimed, among other things, that the word Maat (truth, justice) is written incorrectly in four places. He further criticised the depiction of Akhenaten as left-handed, which in his view is contrary to ancient Egyptian iconography. The yellow weathering on the stone was claimed to be fake, not a patina, with the support of colour analysis. Another Egyptologist, Christian Loeben commented favourably, "The relief is a pastiche, a fraudulently manufactured stylistic mishmash"

== Bibliography ==
- Das Ägyptische Museum von Kairo. von Zabern, Mainz 1986, ISBN 3-8053-0640-7, No. 167.
- Wilfried Seipel in the exhibition catalogue Nofretete - Echnaton. von Zabern, Mainz 1976, Nr. 47.
- Cyril Aldred. Akhenaten and Nefertiti - Exhibition catalogue for the 150th anniversary of the Brooklyn Institute of Arts and Sciences, Brooklyn Museum/Viking Press, New York, 1973, ISBN 0670111392, p. 11, Fig. 2 (Illustration is reversed).
