= Deir Abu Hinnis =

Village in Egypt

Deir Abu Hinnis دير أبو حنس
- Location in Egypt
- Coordinates: 27.7902°N 30.9103°E
- Country: Egypt
- Governorate: Minya
- Time zone: UTC+2 (EET)
  - Summer (DST): UTC+3 (EEST)

Deir Abu Hinnis (Arabic: دير أبو حنس) is a village in the Minya Governorate, Egypt, on the eastern side of the Nile. The village includes an archaeological site that contain more than two hundred limestone quarries. The quarries in Deir Abu Hinnis were in use from the Middle Kingdom (2125–1775 BC) to the Coptic Period (3rd century–9th century AD).

The village had a population of 19,638 in 2006.

A 6th-century cave church in the mountains between Deir Abu Hinnis and Deir El Bersha shows the oldest painting of the Flight into Egypt.

== Gallery ==
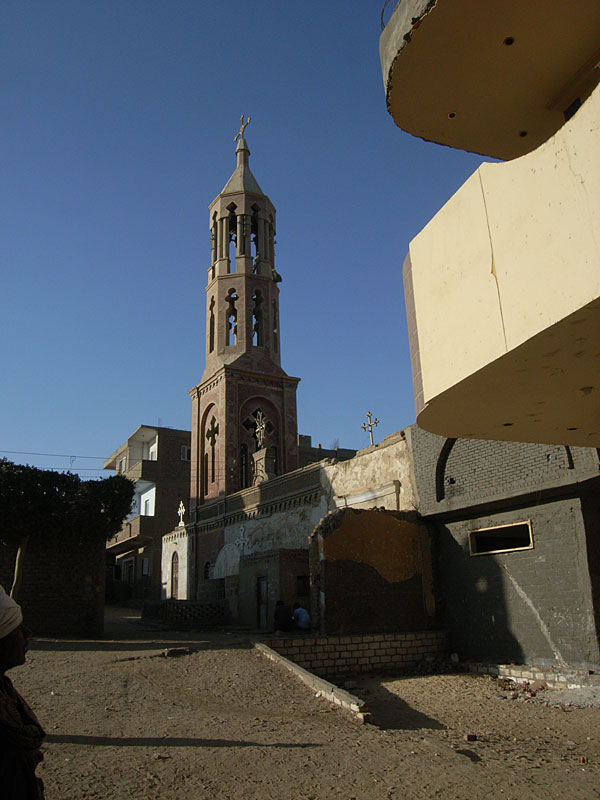
Church of John the Short
