= Amarna succession =

Succession of Egyptian kings

The succession of kings at the end of the Eighteenth Dynasty of Ancient Egypt is a matter of great debate and confusion. There are very few contemporary records that can be relied upon, due to the nature of the Amarna Period and the reign of Akhenaten and his successors and possible co-regents. It is known that Akhenaten reigned for seventeen years, and it was previously believed that in the last 3 or 4 years, he had two co-regents: Smenkhkare, who was possibly his brother or son, and Neferneferuaten, who was either one of his daughters or his Great Royal Wife Nefertiti. It is unknown in which order they followed each other, and neither of their reigns lasted long, for Tutankhamun succeeded them not long after Akhenaten's death.

The last dated appearance of Akhenaten and the Amarna family is in the tomb of Meryre II, and dates from second month, year 12 of his reign. After this the historical record is unclear, and only with the succession of Tutankhamun is it somewhat clarified.

However, the coregency theory has been called into question by the December 2012 announcement of the discovery of a Year 16 III Akhet day 15 inscription dated explicitly to Akhenaten's reign which mentions, in the same breath, the presence of Queen Nefertiti--or the "Great Royal Wife, His Beloved, Lady of the Two Lands, Neferneferuaten Nefertiti"–in its third line. The badly legible five line text, found in a limestone quarry at Deir el-Bersha "mentions a building project in Amarna"–Egypt's political capital under Akhenaten and was deciphered and published by Athena Van der Perre in a 2014 article. This means that Nefertiti was still Akhenaten's living wife late in this pharaoh's 16th year (and second last year); thus, the Amarna pharaohs Smenkhkare and Neferneferuaten could only have succeeded to the throne in Akhenaten's 16th year in a brief 9 month coregency or have had an independent reign of their own over Egypt which lasted for around two full years after this king's death. Today, many Egyptologists believe that the female king Neferneferuaten was likely Nefertiti and that she was the direct predecessor of Tutankhamun.

The archaeological evidence suggests this Eighteenth Dynasty chronology table below is closer to the truth since it agrees with the historical facts.

King	Approx years
Akhenaten	17 years
Ankhkheperure Smenkhkare (coregent)	2 years
Ankhkheperure Neferneferuaten	2 years
Tutankhaten/Tutankhamun	9 years
Ay	4 years
Horemheb	14 years

The royal line of the dynasty died out with Tutankhamun, for two foetuses found buried in his tomb are likely to have been his daughters, according to a 2008 investigation.

== Sources ==
The Coregency Stela, found in a tomb in Amarna possibly shows his queen Nefertiti as his coregent, ruling alongside him.
