= Neferneferuaten (disambiguation) =

Neferneferuaten may refer to several members of the Amarna royal family of the 18th dynasty:

- Neferneferuaten, female ruler or co-regent who coincided with the last years of Akhenaten or just after his reign
- Neferneferuaten Tasherit, the fourth daughter of Akhenaten and Nefertiti

== See also ==
- Nefertiti, who took on the full name Neferneferuaten-Nefertiti around year 5 of the reign of her husband Akhenaten
- Smenkhkare, sometimes confused with Neferneferuaten
