= Smenkhkare =

Egyptian pharaoh

Ankhkheperure

Pharaoh
- Reign: c. 1335 - c. 1334 BC
Royal titulary
Prenomen
Ankhkheperure
Living are the Manifestations of Re
- Consort: Meritaten
- Died: c. 1334 BC
- Dynasty: 18th Dynasty of Egypt

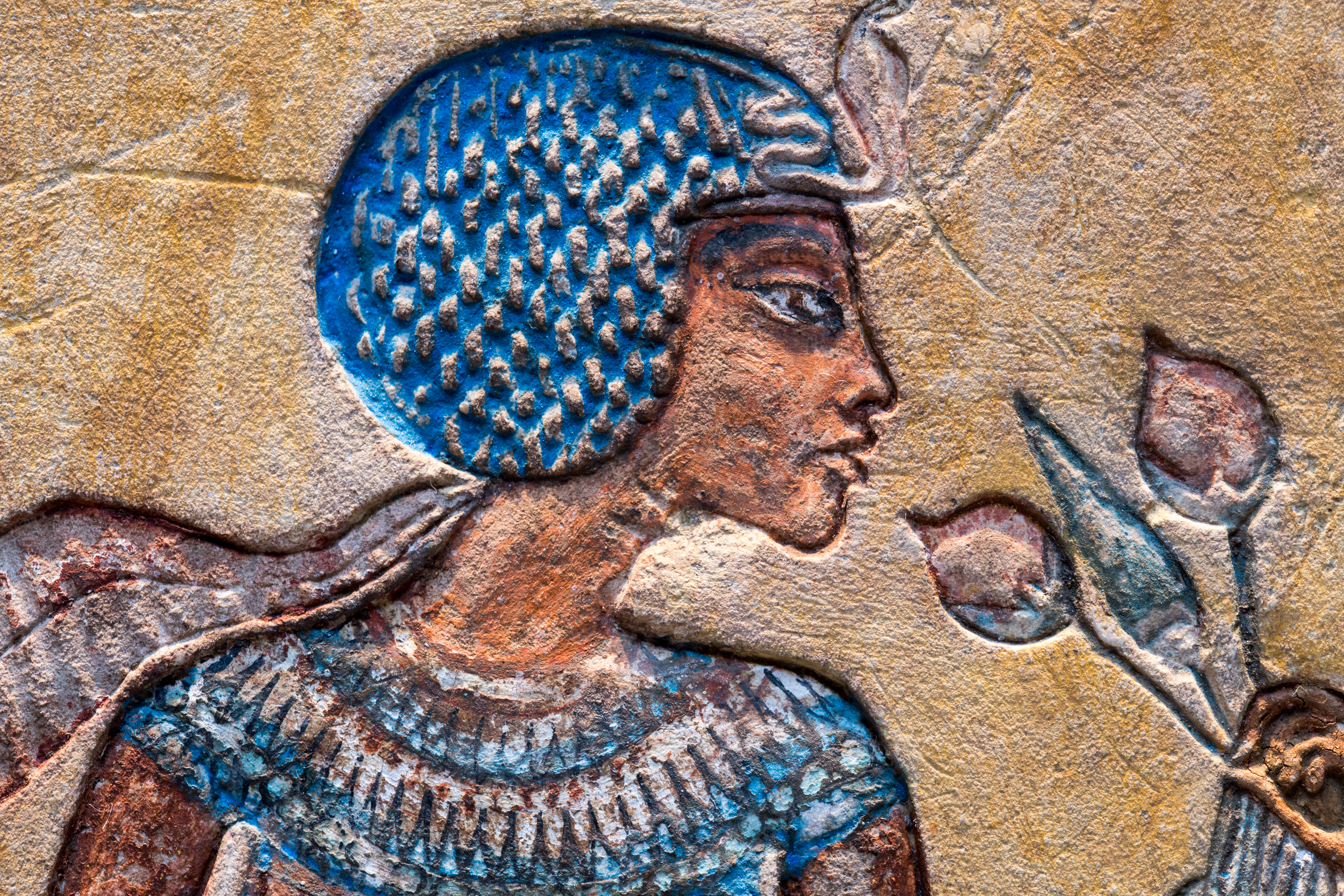
A young pharaoh who may be Smenkhkare depicted in Amarna style

Smenkhkare (alternatively romanized Smenkhare, Smenkare, or Smenkhkara; meaning "Vigorous is the soul of Re"; died c. 1334 BC) was an ancient Egyptian pharaoh of unknown background who lived and ruled during the Amarna Period of the 18th Dynasty. Smenkhkare was married to Meritaten, the daughter of Amenhotep IV, Smenkhkare's probable co-regent. Since the Amarna period was subject to a large-scale condemnation of memory by later pharaohs, very little can be said with certainty about Smenkhkare, who therefore remains subject to immense speculation.

Some researchers believe that Smenkhkare was the same person as female pharaoh Neferneferuaten, while others maintain they were two different individuals. This article follows the stance that Smenkhkare was a male ruler, separate from Neferneferuaten. Smenkhkare is generally considered to have been Amenhotep IV's co-regent but he may also reigned independently.

== Origin and family ==
Smenkhkare's origins are debated. It is assumed that he was a member of the royal family, likely either a brother or son of the pharaoh Amenhotep IV. If he was Amenhotep IV's brother, his mother was likely either Tiye or Sitamun. If a son of Amenhotep IV, he was presumably an older brother of Tutankhaten, as he succeeded the throne ahead of him; his mother was likely an unknown, lesser wife. An alternative suggestion, based on objects from the tomb of Tutankhamun, is that Smenkhkare was the son of Amenhotep IV's older brother, Thutmose and an unknown woman, possibly one of his sisters.

Smenkhkare is known to have married Amenhotep IV's eldest daughter, Meritaten, who was his Great Royal Wife. Inscriptions mention a King's Daughter named Meritaten Tasherit, who may be the daughter of Meritaten and Smenkhkare. Furthermore, Smenkhkare has been put forth as a candidate for the mummy in KV55. If so, he would be the father of Tutankhaten.

== Reign as pharaoh ==
=== Length of reign ===
Clear evidence for a sole reign for Smenkhkare has not yet been found. There are few artifacts that attest to his existence at all, and so it is assumed his reign was short. A wine docket from "the house of Smenkhkare" attests to Regnal Year 1. A second wine docket dated to Year 1 refers to him as "Smenkhkare, (deceased)" and may indicate that he died during his first regnal year.

Some Egyptologists have speculated about the possibility of a two- or three-year reign for Smenkhkare based on a number of wine dockets from Amarna that lack a king's name but bear dates for regnal years 2 and 3. However, they could belong to the other, female, Amarna king who had an attested Year 3 such as Neferneferuaten and are not definitive proof either way.

=== Smenkhkare Hall ===
While there are few monuments or artifacts that attest to Smenkhkare's existence, there is a major addition to the Amarna palace complex that bears his name. It was built around Year 15 and was likely built for a significant event related to him.

== Theories of timing of Smenkhkare's reign ==
Academic consensus has yet to be reached about when exactly Smenkhkare ruled as pharaoh and where he falls in the timeline of Amarna. In particular, the confusion of his identity compared to that of Pharaoh Neferneferuaten has led to considerable academic debate about the order of kings in the late Amarna Period. Aidan Dodson suggests that Smenkhkare did not have a sole reign and only served as Amenhotep IV's co-regent for about a year around Regnal Year 13. James Allen once depicted Smenkhkare as the successor to Neferneferuaten in 2009 and Marc Gabolde has suggested that after Smenkhkare's reign, Meritaten succeeded him as Neferneferuaten. But after the discovery of a Year 16 date for Amenhotep IV's Great King's Wife, Nefertiti, which established that she was still alive in Amenhotep IV's Year 16, Professor J.P. Allen updated his opinion and accepted the hypothesis that Neferneferuaten must be Nefertiti herself in a published GM 249 (2016) paper titled “The Amarna Succession Revised":

"The evidence indicates Smenkhkare ruled only about a year at most....Smenkhkare's premature death probably no later than Amenhotep IV's Regnal Year 14 left only the one-to-four year old heir Tutankhuaten as putative heir....Tutankhamun must have been considered too young to be named coregent in his father's stead....To safeguard Tutankhamun's accession, Amenhotep IV also appointed a female coregent Ankheperure Neferneferuaten, to oversee the transition and probably to instruct him in the new religion. In 2009, I argued that this coregent was Amenhotep IV's fourth daughter, Neferneferuaten, both because it seemed a logical progression in his attempts to produce a son within each of his daughters as they reached puberty, and because evidence was lacking that the other Neferneferuaten, Nefertiti, was still alive in Amenhotep IV's final years. The Year 16 inscription noted [for the existence of Amenhotep IV's wife] at the beginning of this article solves the latter problem, and I (and my students) now think it likeliest that the coregent was in fact, Nefertiti. The arguments for this are more compelling than they are for the daughter...Since Nefertiti was still chief queen in Regnal Year 16 [of Amenhotep IV], her Year 3 as pharaoh must have occurred two years after Amenhotep IV's death, and it was within those two years that the first steps towards reconciliation with Amun occurred."

=== Co-regency with Amenhotep IV ===
Per Dodson's theory, Smenkhkare served only as co-regent with Amenhotep IV and never had an individual rule and Nefertiti became co-regent and eventual successor to Amenhotep IV. Smenkhkare and Meritaten appear together in the tomb of Meryre II at Amarna, rewarding Meryre. There, Smenkhkare wears the khepresh crown, however he is called the son-in-law of Amenhotep IV. Further, his name appears only during Amenhotep IV's reign without certain evidence to attest to a sole reign. The names of the king have since been cut out but were recorded around 1850 by Karl Lepsius. Additionally, a calcite "globular vase" from Tutankhamun's tomb displays the full double cartouches of both pharaohs. However, this is the only object known to carry both names side-by-side. This evidence has been taken by some Egyptologists to indicate that Amenhotep IV and Smenkhkare were co-regents. However, the scene in Meryre's tomb is undated and Amenhotep IV is neither depicted nor mentioned in the tomb. The jar may simply be a case of one king associating himself with a predecessor. The simple association of names, particularly on everyday objects, is not conclusive of a co-regency.

=== Smenkhkare as successor to Neferneferuaten ===
Arguing against the co-regency theory, Allen suggests that Neferneferuaten followed Amenhotep IV and that upon her death, Smenkhkare ascended as pharaoh. Allen once proposed that following Nefertiti's death in Year 13 or 14, her daughter Neferneferuaten-tasherit became Pharaoh Neferneferuaten. After Neferneferuaten's short rule of two or three years, according to Allen, Smenkhkare became pharaoh. Under this theory, both pharaohs succeeded Amenhotep IV: Neferneferuaten as the chosen successor and Smenkhkare as a rival with the same prenomen, perhaps to challenge Amenhotep IV's unacceptable choice. However, a hieratic inscription discovered at the limestone quarry at Deir Abu Hinnis suggests that Nefertiti was alive in Amenhotep IV's Year 16, undermining this theory. There, Nefertiti is referred to as the pharaoh's Great Royal Wife. As noted above, in an updated 2016 Gottinger Miszellen paper titled “The Amarna Succession Revised" published in light of Vander Perre's discovery, J.P. Allen now accepts that the female pharaoh was not Amenhotep IV's daughter Neferneferuaten Tasherit but rather Queen Nefertiti herself who is known to have used the Neferneferuaten title in her lifetime as Amenhotep IV's queen and likely have proclaimed herself as a female king of Egypt when her husband died.

Furthermore, work is believed to have halted on the Amarna tombs shortly after Year 13. Therefore, the depiction of Smenkhkare in Meryre's tomb must date to no later than Year 13. For him to have succeeded Neferneferuaten means that aside from a lone wine docket, he left not a single trace over the course of five to six years.

=== Meritaten as successor to Smenkhkare ===
In comparison to the theories mentioned above, Marc Gabolde has advocated that Smenkhkare's Great Royal Wife, Meritaten, became Pharaoh Neferneferuaten after her husband's death. The main argument against this is a box (Carter 001k) from Tutankhamun's tomb that lists Amenhotep IV, Neferneferuaten, and Meritaten as three separate individuals. There, Meritaten is explicitly listed as Great Royal Wife. Further, various private stelae depict the female pharaoh with Amenhotep IV. However under this theory, Amenhotep IV would be dead by the time Meritaten became pharaoh as Neferneferuaten. Gabolde suggest that these depictions are retrospective. Yet since these are private cult stelae it would require a number of people to get the same idea to commission a retrospective, commemorative stela at the same time. Allen notes that the everyday interaction portrayed in them more likely indicates two living people.

== Identity and confusion over regnal name ==
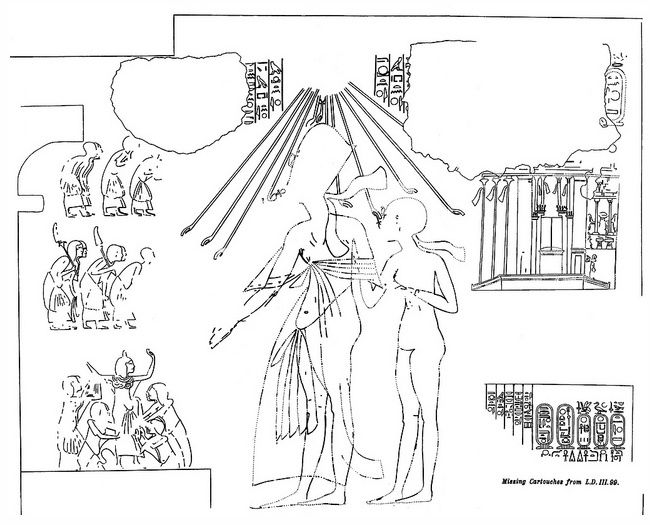
Line drawing from the tomb of Meryre II - the lost names had been recorded previously (inset) as Smenkhkare and Meritaten

There has been much confusion in identifying artifacts related to Smenkhkare because another pharaoh from the Amarna Period bears the same or similar royal titulary. In 1978, it was proposed that there were two individuals using the same name: a male king Smenkhkare and a female Neferneferuaten. Neferneferuaten has since been identified as a female pharaoh who ruled during the Amarna Period and is generally accepted as a separate person from Smenkhkare. Neferneferuaten is theorized to be either Nefertiti or Meritaten. The previous hypothesis that she was Neferneferuaten Tasherit by the Egyptologist James Peter Allen in a 2009 paper was later rejected by the same scholar in a later 2016 paper in favour of Nefertiti with the publication of the Year 16 date showing that Nefertiti was still alive in Amenhotep IV's second last year of rule.

After their initial rediscovery, Smenkhkare and Neferneferuaten were assumed to be the same person because of their similar prenomen (throne name). Typically, throne names in Ancient Egypt were unique. Thus, the use of similar titulary led to a great deal of confusion among Egyptologists. For the better part of a century, the repetition of throne names was taken to mean that Smenkhare changed his name to Neferneferuaten at some point, probably upon the start of his sole reign. Indeed, Petrie makes exactly that distinction in his 1894 excavation notes. Later, a different set of names emerged using the same: "Ankhkheperure mery Neferkheperure [Akhenaten] Neferneferuaten mery Wa en Re [Akhenaten]".

Smenkhkare can be differentiated from Neferneferutaten by the lack of an epithet associated with his throne name. James Peter Allen pointed out the name 'Ankhkheperure' nearly always included the epithet 'desired of Wa en Re' (referring to Amenhotep IV) when coupled with the nomen 'Neferneferuaten'. There were no occasions where 'Ankhkheprure plus epithet' occurred alongside 'Smenkhkare;' nor was plain 'Ankhkheperure' ever found associated with the nomen Neferneferuaten. However, differentiating between the two individuals when 'Ankhkheperure' occurs alone is complicated by the Pawah graffito from TT139. Here, Ankhkheperure is used alone twice when referring to Neferneferutaten. In some instances, a female version 'Ankhetkheperure' occurs; in this case the individual is Neferneferuaten.

The issue of a female Neferneferuaten was finally settled for the remaining holdouts when Allen confirmed Marc Gabolde's findings that objects from Tutankhamun's tomb originally inscribed for Neferneferuaten which had been read using the epithet "...desired of Akhenaten" were originally inscribed as Akhet-en-hyes or "effective for her husband."

=== Theories ===
==== Amenhotep IV and Smenkhkare as gay couple ====
Theories arose when the two pharaohs Smenkhkare and Neferneferutaten were still considered the same, male person, that he and Amenhotep IV could have been gay lovers or even married. This is because of artwork clearly showing Amenhotep IV in familiar, intimate poses with another pharaoh. For example, stele in Berlin depicts a pair of royal figures, one in the double crown and the other, who appears to be a woman, in the khepresh crown. However, the set of three empty cartouches can only account for the names of a king and queen. This has been interpreted to mean that at one point Nefertiti may have been a coregent, as indicated by the crown, but not entitled to full pharaonic honors such as the double cartouche. Furthermore, it is now accepted that other artifacts similar to this one are depictions of Amenhotep IV and Neferneferuaten.

==== Nefertiti as Smenkhkare ====
Alternatively, once the feminine traces were discovered in some versions of the throne names, it was proposed by John Harris Nefertiti was masquerading as Smenkhkare, and ruled both under this name as well name of Neferneferuaten. In such case Smenkhkare/Nefertiti's marriage to Meritaten could be interpreted then as symbolic, with the female Pharaoh and her daughter representing ideological aspects of kingship associated with gender, usually displayed by male king and his main wife. This situation would not be completely unprecedented, as during Hatshepsut's reign generations prior, Hatshepsut was masculinizing her images, while her daughter Neferure, though not married to her mother, acted as first lady of Egypt at her side as High Priestess of Amun.

== Evidence ==
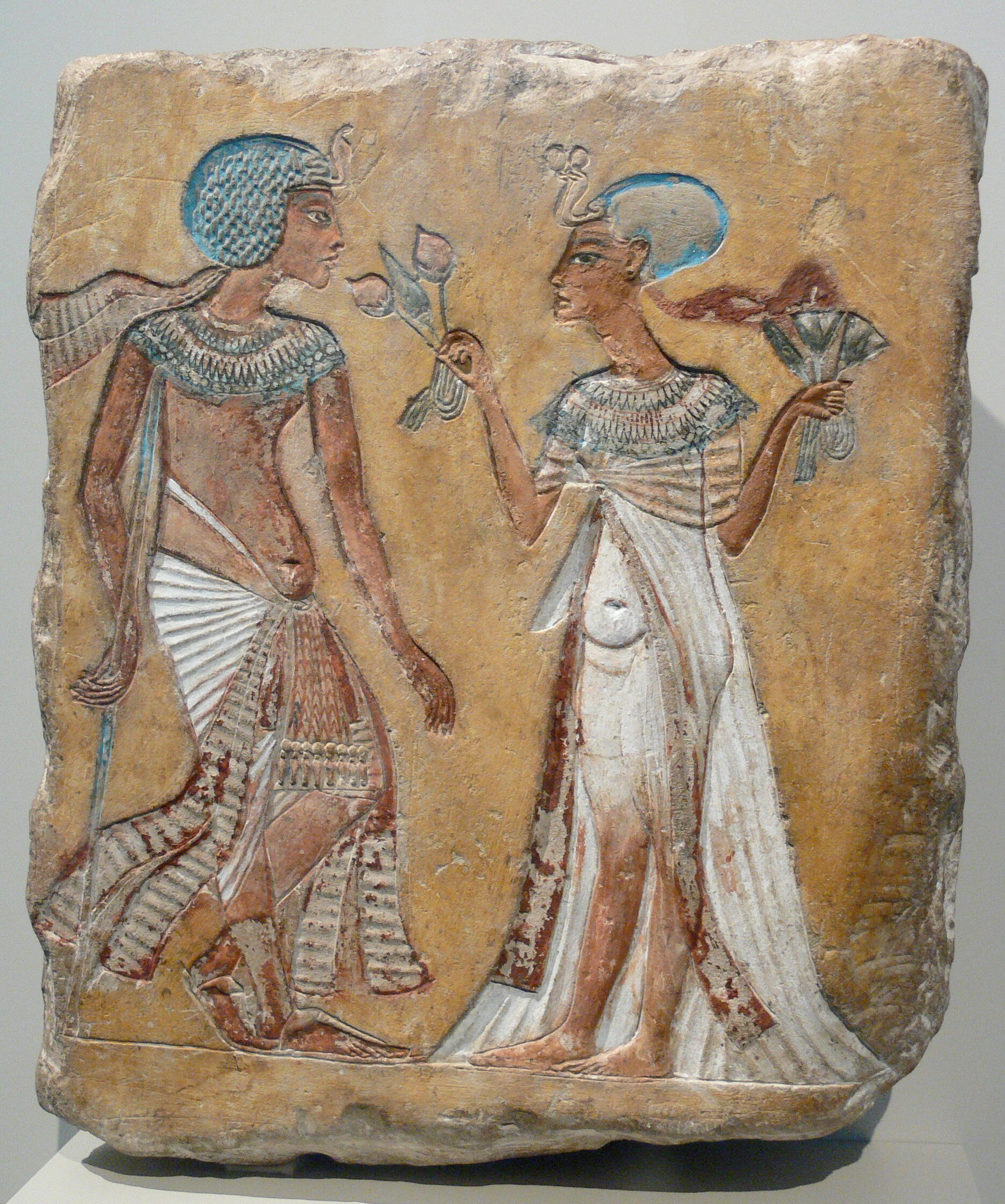
This image is commonly taken to be Smenkhkare and Meritaten, although it may be Tutankhaten and Ankhesenamun

- The Coregency Stela U.C. 410, now in the Petrie Museum. Although badly damaged, partial inscriptions survive. It shows the double cartouche of Amenhotep IV alongside that of Ankhkheperure mery-Waenre Neferneferuaten Akhet-en-hyes ('effective for her husband'). The inscription originally bore the single cartouche of Nefertiti, which was erased along with a reference to Meritaten to make room for the double cartouche of King Neferneferuaten.
- Line drawings of a block depicting the nearly complete names of King Smenkhkare and Meritaten as Great Royal Wife were recorded before the block was lost.
- A cartouche which was stamped on a jar handle before firing, from Tell Jerishe (Tel Gerisa) in Israel. It bears the throne name of Smenkhkare.
- Flinders Petrie documented six rings bearing only the Throne Name 'Ankhkheperure' (the other six with the same Throne Name show an epithet: or Mery Neferkheperure, no. 92 and no. 93; or Mery Waenre, no. 94, 95, and 96) and two more bearing 'Smenkhkare' (with another one bearing the epithet Djeserkheperu, which belonged to Smenkhkare) in excavations of the palace. One example is Item UC23800 in the Petrie Museum which clearly shows the "djeser" and "kheperu" elements and a portion of the 'ka' glyph. Pendlebury found more when the town was cleared.
- A ring bearing his name is found at Malqata in Thebes.
- Perhaps the most magnificent was a vast hall more than 125 metres square and including over 500 pillars. This late addition to the central palace has been known as the Hall of Rejoicing, Coronation Hall, or simply Smenkhkare Hall because a number of bricks stamped Ankhkheperure in the House of Rejoicing in the Aten were found at the site.
- Indisputable images for Smenkhkare are rare. Aside from the tomb of Meryre II, a carved and painted relief showing an Amarna king and queen in a garden is often attributed to him. It is completely without inscription, but since they do not look like Tutankhamun or his queen, they are often assumed to be Smenkhkare and Meritaten, but Amenhotep IV and Nefertiti are sometimes put forth as well.
- An inscription in the tomb of Pairi, TT139, by the other Ankhkheperure (Neferneferuaten), mentions a functioning Amen 'temple of Ankhkheperure'.

Several items from the tomb of Tutankhamun bear the name of Smenkhkare:

- A linen garment decorated with 39 gold daisies along with 47 other sequins bearing the prenomen of Smenkhkare alongside Meritaten's name.
- Carter number 101s is a linen shawl with the name Ankhkheperure
- A compound bow (Carter 48h) and the mummy bands (Carter 256b) were both reworked for Tutankhamun.
- Less certain, but much more impressive is the second anthropoid coffin containing the mummy of Tutankhamun. The face depicted is much more square than that of the other coffins and quite unlike the gold mask or other depictions of Tutankhamun. The coffin is rishi style and inlaid with coloured glass, a feature only found on this coffin and one from KV55, the speculated resting place for the mummy of Smenkhkare. Since both cartouches show signs of being reworked, Dodson and Harrison conclude this was most likely originally made for Smenkhkare and reinscribed for Tutankhamun.

As the evidence came to light in bits and pieces at a time when Smenkhkare was assumed to have also used the name Neferneferuaten, perhaps at the start of his sole reign, it sometimes defied logic. For instance, when the mortuary wine docket surfaced from the 'House of Smenkhkare (deceased)', it seemed to appear that he changed his name back before he died.

Since his reign was brief, and he may never have been more than co-regent, the evidence for Smenkhkare is not plentiful, but nor is it quite as insubstantial as it is sometimes made out to be. It certainly amounts to more than just 'a few rings and a wine docket' or that he 'appears only at the very end of Ahkenaton's reign in a few monuments' as is too often portrayed.

== Death and burial ==
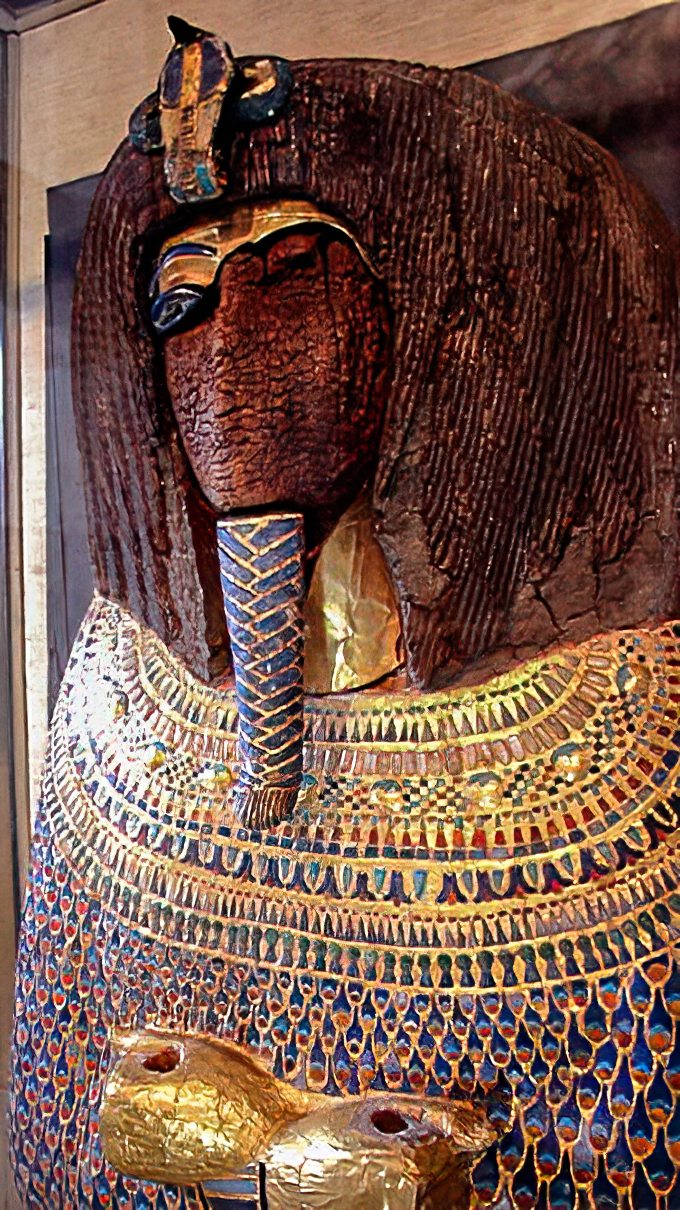
The desecrated royal coffin found in tomb KV55

The location of Smenkhkare's burial is unconfirmed. He has been put forward as a candidate for the mummy discovered in KV55, which rested in a desecrated rishi coffin with the owner's name removed. It is generally accepted that the coffin was originally intended for a female and later reworked to accommodate a male. Over the past century, the chief candidates for this individual have been either Amenhotep IV or Smenkhkare. The case for Smenkhkare comes mostly from the presumed age of the mummy (see below) which, between ages 18 and 26 would not fit Amenhotep IV who reigned for 17 years and had fathered a child near by his first regnal year. There is nothing in the tomb positively identified as belonging to Smenkhkare, nor is his name found there. The tomb is certainly not befitting any king, but even less so for Amenhotep IV.

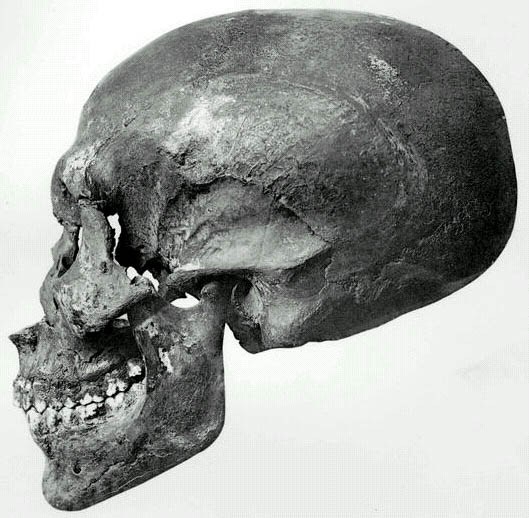
The skull of the mummy in KV55, believed to be Smenkhkare

In 1980, James Harris and Edward Wente conducted X-ray examinations of New Kingdom Pharaoh's crania and skeletal remains, which included the supposed mummified remains of Smenkhkare. The authors determined that the royal mummies of the 18th Dynasty bore strong similarities to contemporary Nubians with slight differences.

Initial studies conducted on the KV55 mummy indicated that the individual was a young man with no apparent abnormalities in his mid-20s or younger. Another study used craniofacial analysis and examined past x-rays on several 18th Dynasty mummies. That study found close cranial similarities between the mummies of Tutankhaten, KV55 and Thutmose IV. In addition, seriological tests published in Nature in 1974 indicated that the KV55 mummy and Tutankhamun shared the same rare blood type. This information led Egyptologists to conclude that the KV55 mummy was either the father or brother of Tutankhaten. A brother seemed more likely since the age would only be old enough to plausibly father a child at the upper extremes.

However, the academic debate was believed concluded following a 2010 genetic study performed by Zahi Hawass that determined that the parents of Tutankhamun were likely the KV55 mummy and "The Younger Lady" mummy from KV35. Chief among the genetic results was, "The statistical analysis revealed that the mummy KV55 is most probably the father of Tutankhamun (probability of 99.99999981%), and KV35 Younger Lady could be identified as his mother (99.99999997%)." The study further identified the two mummies as children of Amenhotep III and Queen Tiye. CT scans also performed on the KV55 mummy indicated that his age at the time of death was likely higher than previous estimates, based on the reveal of age-related degeneration in the spine and osteoarthritis in the knees and spine. These estimates placed the mummy's age at death closer to 40 years than 25. This led to further belief that the mummy was in fact Amenhotep IV.

However, evidence to support the much older claim was not provided beyond the single point of spinal degeneration. Other scholars still dispute Hawass's assessment of the mummy's age and the identification of KV55 as Amenhotep IV. Where Filer and Strouhal relied on multiple indicators to determine the younger age, the new study cited one point to indicate a much older age. One letter to the JAMA editors came from Arizona State University bioarchaeologist Brenda J. Baker. The content was retold on the Archaeology News Network website and is representative of a portion of the dissent:

A specialist in human osteology and paleopathology, Baker takes issue with the identification of the skeletonized mummy KV55 as Tutankhamun's father, Akhenaten. The authors [Hawass et al in JAMA] place this individual’s age at the time of death at 35–45, despite producing no evidence that repudiates well-known prior examinations citing the age in the 18–26 range. These earlier analyses – documented with written descriptions, photographs and radiographs – show a pattern of fused and unfused epiphyses (caps on ends of growing bones) throughout the skeleton, indicating a man much younger than Akhenaten is believed to have been at the time of his death. Baker also uses a photograph of the pubic symphysis of the pelvis to narrow the age of KV55 to 18–23 based on recent techniques used in osteology and forensic anthropology.

An examination of the KV55 mummy was conducted in 1998 by Czech anthropologist Eugen Strouhal. He published his conclusions in 2010 where he 'utterly excluded the possibility of Amenhotep IV':

[T]he unambiguous male skeleton from Tomb 55 proved decisively by a long list of biological developmental features his age at death to be in the range of 19–22 years which fully agrees with the results of the previous determination by Harrison (1966)... He did not possess the slightest dental pathology and not even the onset of degenerative changes in the spine and joints.

Moreover, according to the genetic research KV55 cannot be maternal grandfather of the two daughters of Tutankhamun, who are believed to be children of Amenhotep IV's daughter, Queen Ankhesenamun. Juan Belmonte argues that the most likely solution to this problem is that KV55 body belongs to Smenkhkare, not Amenhotep IV. However he acknowledges that there are also possibilities that Tutankhamun fathered his children by different consort(s) than Ankhesenamun, or that KV55 is indeed Amenhotep IV but he was not the biological father of Ankhesenamun because of Nefertiti's extramarital affair.

== Bibliography ==
- Aldred, Cyril. Akhenaten, King of Egypt (Thames & Hudson, 1988)
- Aldred, Cyril. Akhenaten, Pharaoh of Light (Thames & Hudson, 1968)
- Allen, James P. Two Altered Inscriptions of the Late Amarna Period, Journal of the American Research Center in Egypt 25 (1988)
- Allen, James (2006). "The Amarna Succession" (PDF). Archived from the original on July 1, 2013.
- Allen, James P. Nefertiti and Smenkh-ka-re. Göttinger Miszellen 141; (1994)
- Allen, James P. “The Amarna Succession Revised,” GM 249 (2016), pp.9-13
- Bryce, Trevor R. “The Death of Niphururiya and Its Aftermath.” The Journal of Egyptian Archaeology, vol. 76, 1990, pp. 97–105. JSTOR 3822010
- Clayton, Peter "Chronicle of the Pharaohs," Thames and Hudson, (2006)
- Dayr al-Barsha Project; Press Release, Dec. 2012; Online English Press Release
- Dodson, Aidan (2009). Amarna Sunset: Nefertiti, Tutankhamun, Ay, Horemheb, and the Egyptian Counter-Reformation. Cairo: The American University in Cairo Press. ISBN 978-977-416-304-3.
- Dodson, Aidan; Hilton, Dyan (2004). The Complete Royal Families of Ancient Egypt (First paperback ed.). London: Thames & Hudson. ISBN 978-977-424-957-0.
- Filer, J. "Anatomy of a Mummy." Archaeology, Mar/Apr2002, 55(2)
- Gabolde, Marc. D’Akhenaton à Tout-ânkhamon (1998) Paris
- Giles, Frederick. J. Ikhnaton Legend and History (1970, Associated University Press, 1972 US)
- Giles, Frederick. J. The Amarna Age: Egypt (Australian Centre for Egyptology, 2001)
- Habicht, Michael E. Semenchkare – Phantom-König(in) von Achet-Aton (e-publication, Berlin 2014). ISBN 978-3844281699
- Habicht, Michael E. Smenkhkare: Phantom-Queen/King of Akhet-Aton and the quest for the hitherto unknown chambers in the tomb of Tutankhamun (KV 62) (e-publication, Berlin 2017). ISBN 978-3745041453 Archived 2017-11-12 at the Wayback Machine
- Hawass, Z., Y. Gad, et al. Ancestry and Pathology in King Tutankhamun's Family (2010) in Journal of the American medical Association 303/7.
- Hornung, E. Akhenaten and the Religion of Light, Cornell University, 1999
- Hornung, E. "The New Kingdom"', in E. Hornung, R. Krauss, and D. A. Warburton, eds., Ancient Egyptian Chronology (HdO I/83), Leiden – Boston, 2006.
- Krauss, Rolf. Das Ende der Amarnazeit (The End of the Amarna Period); 1978, Hildesheim
- Miller, J. Amarna Age Chronology and the Identity of Nibhururiya in the Light of a Newly Reconstructed Hittite Text in Altoriental. Forsch. 34 (2007)
- Moran, William L. The Amarna Letters. Baltimore: Johns Hopkins University Press, 1992
- Murnane, W. Ancient Egyptian Coregencies (1977)
- Murnane, W. Texts from the Amarna Period (1995)
- Newberry, P. E. 'Appendix III: Report on the Floral Wreaths Found in the Coffins of Tut.Ankh.Amen' in H. Carter, The Tomb of Tut.Ankh.Amen Volume Two London: Cassell (1927)
- O'Connor, D and Cline, E, (eds); Amenhotep III: perspectives on his reign (1998) University of Michigan Press
- Pendlebury J., Samson, J. et al. City of Akhenaten, Part III (1951)
- Petrie, W. M. Flinders; Tell el Amarna (1894)
- Ridley, Ronald T. (2019). Akhenaten: A Historian's View. The American University in Cairo Press. ISBN 978-977-416-793-5.
- Reeves, C.N. Akhenaten, Egypt's false Prophet (Thames and Hudson; 2001)
- Reeves, C.N. The Valley of the Kings (Kegan Paul, 1990)
- Reeves, C.N. The Complete Tutankhamun: The King – The Tomb – The Royal Treasure. London: Thames and Hudson; 1990.
- Tawfik, Tarek; Thomas, Susanna; Hegenbarth-Reichardt, Ina (2018). "New Evidence for Tutankhamun's Parents: Revelations from the Grand Egyptian Museum". Mitteilungen des Deutschen Archäologischen Instituts, Abteilung Kairo. 74: 179–195.
- Theis, Christoffer, "Der Brief der Königin Daḫamunzu an den hethitischen König Šuppiluliuma I im Lichte von Reisegeschwindigkeiten und Zeitabläufen", in Thomas R. Kämmerer (Hrsg.), Identities and Societies in the Ancient East-Mediterranean Regions. Comparative Approaches. Henning Graf Reventlow Memorial Volume (= AAMO 1, AOAT 390/1). Münster 2011, S. 301–331
- Wente, E. Who Was Who Among the Royal Mummies? (1995), Oriental Institute, Chicago
