= TT139 =

Theban tomb TT139
- Burial site of Pairy or Pairi
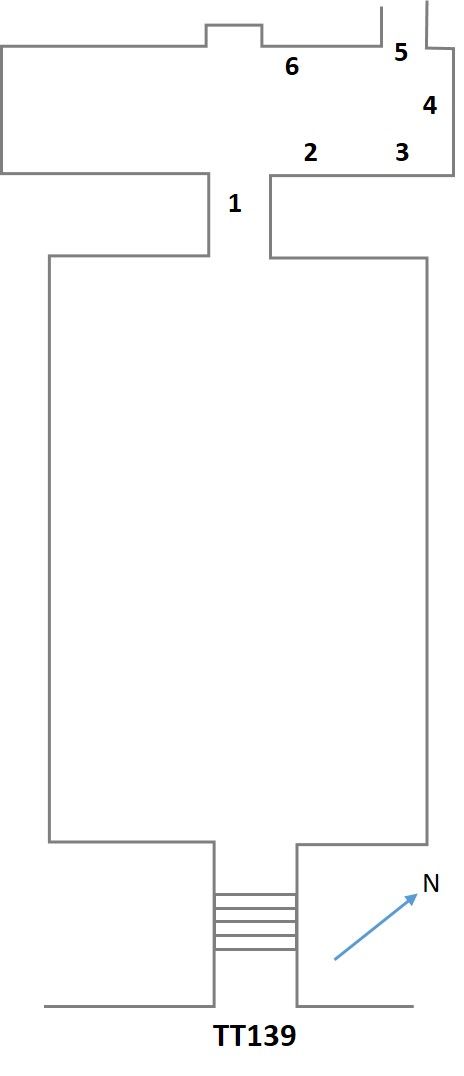
- Floor plan of TT139

- Location within Egypt
- Location: Sheikh Abd el-Qurna, Theban Necropolis
- Layout: T-shaped
- ← Previous; TT138 Next → TT140

The Tomb of the Nobles (Theban tomb) TT139 is located at Sheikh Abd el-Qurna, in the Theban Necropolis, on the west bank of the Nile, opposite Luxor in Egypt. The Tombs of the Nobles was intended for the burials of nobles and officials connected to the ruling houses, especially of the powerful New Kingdom of Egypt from the 18th dynasty to the 20th dynasty. However, the area had already been used as a burial necropolis since the Old Kingdom of Egypt and, subsequently, up to the Saite period (with the 26th dynasty) and Ptolemaic period.

It is the tomb of Pairy or Pairi (Pȝ-jrj), a wab-priest of Amun, overseer of the peasants, dating from the reign of king Amenhotep III (18th Dynasty of Egypt). Pairy also held the title of "High Priest of Ptah at Karnak under Amenhotep III. One of the tomb's chapel walls shows Pairy making offerings to his parents; Pairy's father is identified as a certain Shuroy who was a serving priest and servant of the gods Ptah and Hathor at Thebes.

== Placement of Tomb TT139 ==
Megan O'Neil observes that "while the tombs of the northern part of the hill [at Sheikh Abd el-Qurna] predominately belong to the nobility of the early eighteenth dynasty [of Egypt], the southern enclosure was a popular location for tombs of the latter half of the dynasty. [Tomb] TT139 is fairly isolated, with the closest neighboring tombs belonging to the late eighteenth-dynasty governor and vizier under Amenhotep IV [or Akhenaten], Ramose (TT55), the nineteenth-dynasty "Wab-Priest in Front of Amun", Bekenamun (TT135) and the "First Kings Son", Amenhotep (TT345) of the mid-eighteenth dynasty." As the High Priest of Ptah at Karnak, Pairy was permitted to enter Ptah’s holy sanctuary daily, look upon the god’s effigy, and perform the sacred cult ritual.

O'Neil notes that:

The location and direction in which Pairy chose to situate his tomb amidst his peers was deliberate, and functioned magically to ensure his survival in the afterlife. His final resting place upon the hill [at Sheikh Abd el-Qurna] looked north across the river towards the great temple of Karnak where he loyally served as priest to the gods. This theoretically allowed him to continue to oversee and participate in their cult worship even in death, and to receive offerings reverted to the dead from the god’s temples. The placement of Pairy's tomb was also influenced by its accessibility to living visitors upon whom he relied for commemoration essential for his transfiguration.

Melinda Hartwig states that "In order for the ka or the soul of the deceased to survive in the afterlife it required nourishment through offerings, prayers, and cult rituals performed by priests and relatives, as well as through the recitation of prayers and offering formulas by the tomb’s visitors.

O'Neil concludes:

Once Pairy could no longer depend on family or priests to visit and renew his rites, he relied upon the position of his tomb, which was oriented towards a festival gathering place believed to be located in the vicinity of Ramose's tomb (TT55) south-east of TT139. By situating his tomb chapel here, he hoped to appeal to passersby who had the power to ensure his cycle of rebirth by leaving offerings and reciting the necessary prayers. Text on the right door jamb pleas to the living “...may he give everything good and pure, wine and milk, for the ka of the wab-priest of Amun, Pairy.” The location of TT139 along a processional path enabled Pairy to continue to receive provisions long after the passing of all who knew him, and allowed him to participate eternally with his ancestors in the festivals of the gods as leading porter.

== The Tomb ==
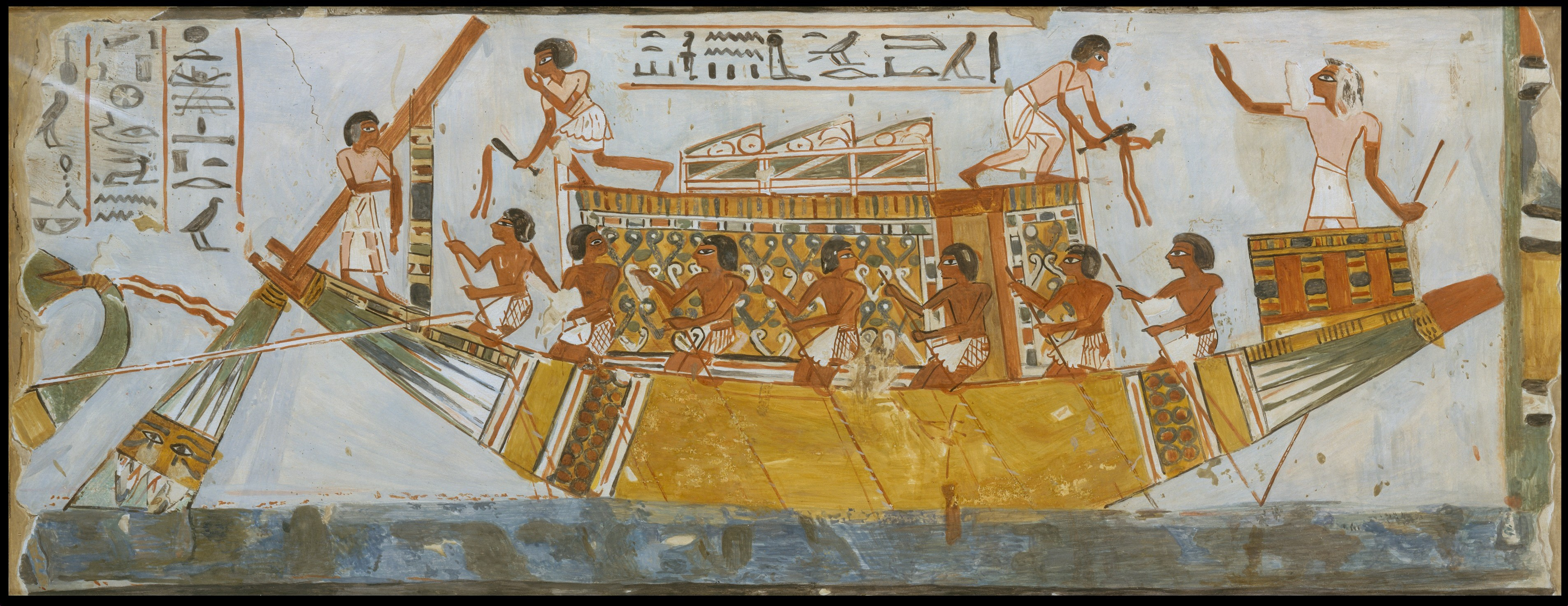
A Barque bringing goods to Pairy in the afterlife

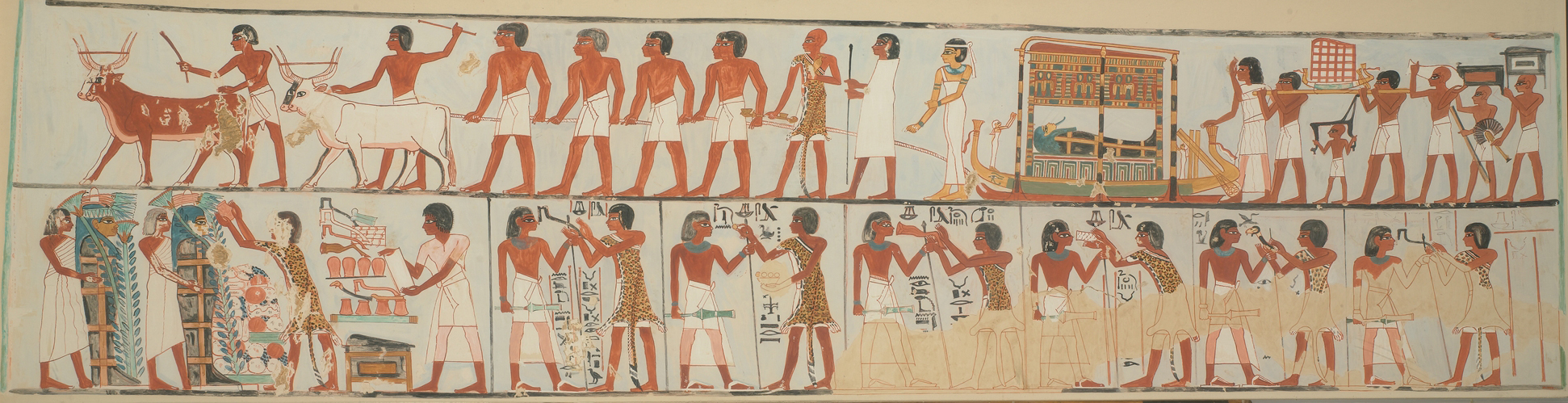
The funeral of procession of Pairy

The entrance to the tomb opens into a courtyard; a short corridor, on whose walls (1 in the plan) the deceased, Pairy with his wife Henutnofret and his family (including a girl indicated as a "royal concubine") pour ointments in libation, leads to a transversal room whose wall paintings are somewhat damaged. However, it is possible to see (2) the son Ptahmose with papyrus flowers; a little further on (3) the sons Amenhotep and, perhaps, Ptahmosi, offering bunches of flowers to the deceased and his wife, and the deceased offering lists of offerings to his parents. On four superimposed registers (4), the deceased and his wife with rows of bearers offering to Osiris, scenes of the funeral procession with the transport of the sarcophagus and the funerary furnishings, the rite of the opening of the mouth officiated by two priests on the mummy and the pilgrimage to Abydos. Above a door (5) the Sons of Horus are hieratic texts dated to Year 3 of the female king Ankhkheperure Neferneferuaten, with hymns to the god Amun by Pawah, Scribe of the divine offerings of Amun in the temple of Ankhkheperure. A last still legible relief represents (6) scenes (unfinished) of the funeral banquet with the son Ptahmose offering lists of offerings to the deceased and to his mother[1].

Archaeological evidence suggests that "the rectangular courtyard of TT139 was once surrounded on all sides by a wall that provided entrance to the structure at the east side (fig. 2.3).93 Although none of the original façade remains intact, the presence of mud brick and limestone fragments, and the architecture of comparable eighteenth-dynasty tombs, support this assumption.

== The Year 3 date of the female king Neferneferuaten ==
Tomb TT139 is also well known for being the only tomb in Egypt to bear a Year 3 date--or any other known date--of the short lived late Amarna female pharaoh named Neferneferuaten--who many other Egyptologists today also believe is Nefertiti such as Chris Naunton, Nozomu Kawai in the American Research Center in Egypt and Aidan Dodson

Aidan Dodson writes in a 2020 article that the inscription for the female king is written as "Year 3, III Akhet 10, Dual King, Lord of the Two Lands, Ankhkheperure-beloved-of-[...], Son of Re, Neferneferuaten-beloved-of-[...] Dodson concludes his article with this passage:

The present writer has discussed the identity of Neferneferuaten and the way in which her reign relates to those of Akhenaten, Smenkhkare, and Tutankhaten in a number of recent works (Dodson 2009; 2014, 140–146; 2018, 34–51). In these, he has argued that (with most—but not all—current researchers) Neferneferuaten was none other than Nefertiti, who transitioned to full female pharaoh during Akhenaten’s Year 16, and (more controversially) that she moved directly from being her husband’s coregent to ruling with Tutankhaten, sharing the latter’s regnal years. On this basis, the writer takes the view that the graffito most likely dates to shortly before the end of Neferneferuaten's career, to be placed just before Tutankhaten's change of name to Tutankhamun.

Some other scholars agree that Neferneferuaten was Nefertiti but think that Neferneferuaten actually had a short sole independent reign of 2 years before being succeeded by Tutankhamun since Tutankhamun promptly abandoned Amarna for Thebes, Egypt after becoming pharaoh...such as Athena van der Perre, and Nozomu Kawai.

James Peter Allen, in "The Amarna Succession Revised", in GM 249 (2016): pp. 9–13 does not take a position whether Neferneferuaten has a sole reign based on her Year 3 date and simply writes below:

The evidence indicates Smenkhkare ruled only about a year at most....Smenkhkare's premature death probably no later than Akhenaten's Regnal Year 14 left only the one-to-four year old heir Tutankhuaten as putative heir....Tutankhamun must have been considered too young to be named coregent in his father's stead....To safeguard Tutankhamun's accession, Akhenaten also appointed a female coregent Ankheperure Neferneferuaten, to oversee the transition and probably to instruct him in the new religion. In 2009, I argued that this coregent was Akhenaten's fourth daughter, Neferneferuaten, both because it seemed a logical progression in his attempts to produce a son within each of his daughters as they reached puberty, and because evidence was lacking that the other Neferneferuaten, Nefertiti, was still alive in Akhenaten's final years. The Year 16 inscription noted [for the existence of Akhenaten's wife] at the beginning of this article solves the latter problem, and I (and my students) now think it likeliest that the coregent was in fact, Nefertiti. The arguments for this are more compelling than they are for the daughter.....Since Nefertiti was still chief queen in Regnal Year 16 [of Akhenaten], her Year 3 as pharaoh must have occurred two years after Akhenaten's death and it was within those two years that the first steps towards reconciliation with Amun occurred. While little is known about the daughter other than her existence, Nefertiti had assumed pharaonic roles and prerogatives throughout Akhenaten’s reign, and the occasional epithet in her nomen Akhet-en-hyes “Beneficial for her husband,” both reflects a relationship that had already existed and mirrors Akhenaten's own nomen [Akh-en-Iten or 'The one who is beneficial to the Aten'] but also with his predecessor...Amenhotep III

== See also ==
- List of Theban tombs

== Bibliography ==
- Sergio Donadoni, Thebes, Milan, Electa, 1999, ISBN 978-88-435-6209-1
- Mario Tosi, Dizionario enciclopedico delle divinità dell'antico Egitto - 2 volumes, Turin, Ananke, 2005, ISBN 978-88-7325-115-6
- Alexander Henry Rhind, Thebes, its Tombs and their tenants, London, Longman, Green, Longman & Roberts, 1862.
- Nicholas Reeves and Araldo De Luca, Valley of the Kings, Friedman/Fairfax, 2001, ISBN 978-1-58663-295-3
- Nicholas Reeves and Richard Wilkinson, The complete Valley of the Kings, New York, Thames & Hudson, 2000, ISBN 978-0-500-05080-4
- Alan Gardiner and Arthur Weigall, Topographical Catalogue of the Private Tombs of Thebes, Londra, Bernard Quaritch, 1913.
- Donald Redford, The Oxford Encyclopedia of Ancient Egypt, Oxford, Oxford University Press, 2001, ISBN 978-0-19-513823-8
- John Gardner Wilkinson, Manners and Customs of the Ancient Egyptians, Londra, John Murray, 1837.
- Bertha Porter and Rosalind Moss, Topographical Bibliography of Ancient Egyptian hieroglyphic texts, reliefs, and paintings. Vol. 1, Oxford, Oxford at the Clarendon Press, 1927.
- David O'Connor and Eric H. Cline, Thutmose III: A New Biography, Ann Arbor (Michigan), University of Michigan Press, 2006, ISBN 978-0-472-11467-2
- William J. Murnane, Texts from the Amarna Period in Egypt, New York, Society of Biblical Literature, 1995, ISBN 978-1-55540-966-1
- Norman de Garis Davies, Two Ramesside Tombs at Thebes, pp. 3–30, New York, 1927.
- Norman de Garis Davies, The Tomb of Nakht at Thebes, New York, Metropolitan Museum of Art, 1917.
- Jiro Kondo, The Re-use of the Private Tombs on the Western Bank of Thebes and Its Chronological Problem: The Cases of the Tomb of Hnsw (no. 31) and the Tomb of Wsr-h3t (no. 51), in Orient n.ro 32, pp. 50–68, 1927.
- O'Neill, Megan C., The Decorative Program of the Eighteenth-Dynasty Tomb of Pairy (TT 139), Georgia State University Thesis, May 9, 2015 PDF
- Kent R. Weeks, The Treasures of Luxor and the Valley of the Kings, pp. 478–483, il Cairo, American University in Cairo Press, 2005.
