= Neferneferuaten =

Ancient Egyptian female ruler

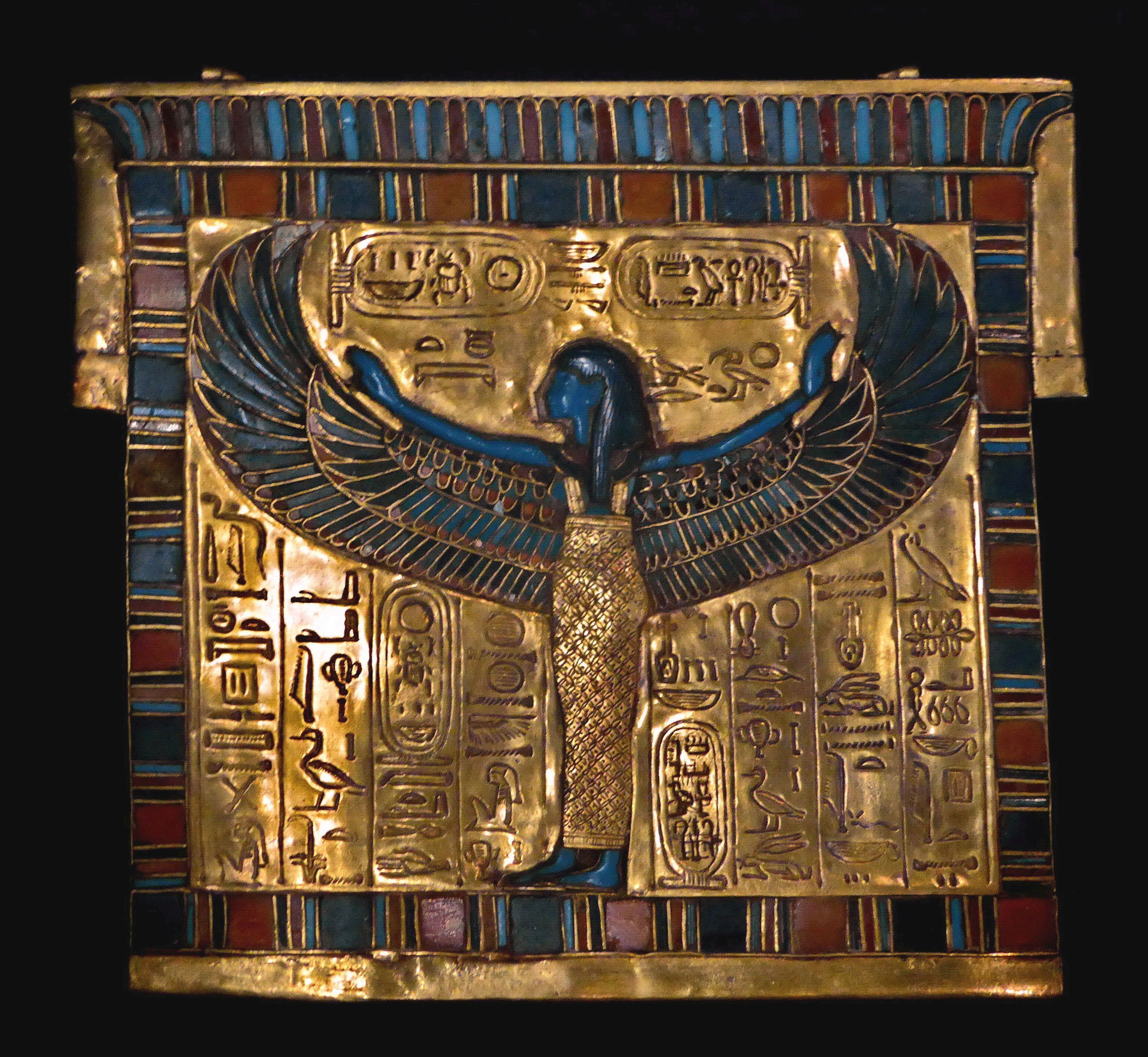
- This gold pectoral of the goddess Nut (Cairo JE61944) originally belonged to the female pharaoh Neferneferuaten since it was inscribed with her cartouches. Later, her cartouches were replaced with those of Tutankhamun.

Pharaoh
- Reign: 1335–1333 BC or; 1334–1332 BC
- Predecessor: Uncertain: Akhenaten (most likely) or Smenkhkare
- Successor: Uncertain: Smenkhkare or Tutankhamun
Royal titulary
Prenomen
Ankhkheperure (plus ephithet)

M23 X1 L2 X1	ra anx xpr Z3A
Nomen
Neferneferuaten (plus ephithet)

G39 N5	i t n N5 nfr nfr nfr nfr
- Consorts: if Nefertiti: Akhenaten if Meritaten: Smenkhkare
- Died: 1333 BC or 1332 BC
- Dynasty: Eighteenth dynasty of Egypt

Ankhkheperure-Merit-Neferkheperure/Waenre/Aten Neferneferuaten (Ancient Egyptian: nfr-nfrw-jtn), or "Neferneferuaten", is the name of a queen regnantof ancient Egypt who reigned in her own right near the end of the Amarna Period during the 18th Dynasty. Her name features feminine gender traces, and one of her epithets was Akhet-en-hyes ("Beneficial for her husband") which proves she was a female pharaoh. This epithet also features in one version of her nomen (birth name) cartouche. (See Ancient Egyptian royal titulary.) The name Neferneferuaten translates as "Perfect/Beautiful is the perfection/beauty of Aten".

There is debate among Egyptologists whether Neferneferuaten is to be identified with Pharaoh Smenkhkare (with whom she shared the throne name Ankhkheperure), or whether they were separate individuals, with Nefertiti, Akhenaten's queen, often proposed as a candidate for her identity.

== Summary ==
Most Egyptologists accept that she was a woman, and likely an individual separate from the male king Smenkhkare. Many specialists in the period believe the epigraphic evidence strongly indicates that she acted for a time as Amenhotep IV's coregent. Since Nefertiti already held the title of "Neferneferuaten" during Akhenaten's reign, it is quite reasonable to identify her as the female pharaoh named Neferneferuaten who succeeded Amenhotep IV on the throne after the latter died and was later succeeded, in turn, by Tutankhaten.

Based on the Pairi or Pawah inscription dated to her third regnal year, it appears she enjoyed a sole reign. How much of her reign was as coregent and how much as sole ruler is a matter of debate and speculation. The same tomb inscription mentions an Amun temple in Thebes, perhaps a mortuary complex, which would seem to indicate that the Amun proscription had abated and the traditional religion was being restored toward the end of her reign. Since much of her funeral equipment was used in Tutankhamen's burial, it seems fairly certain she was denied a pharaonic burial by her successor. The reasons for this remain speculative, as does a regency with Tutankhaten.

== Pharaoh ==
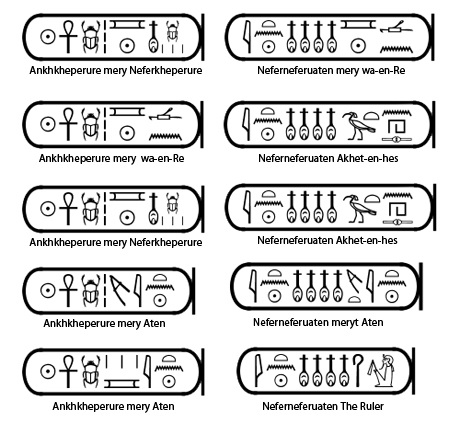
The prenomen (left column) and nomen (right column) forms for Ankhkheperure Neferneferuaten

In the early 1970s, English Egyptologist John Harris noted in a series of papers that cartouches for Neferneferuaten existed that included feminine indicators. These were linked with a few items including a statuette found in Tutankhaten's tomb depicting a pharaoh whose appearance was particularly feminine, even for Amarna art that seems to favor androgyny.

In 1988, James Allen proposed that it was possible to separate Smenkhkare from Neferneferuaten. He pointed out the name 'Ankhkheperure' was rendered differently depending on whether it was associated with Smenkhkare or Neferneferuaten. When coupled with Neferneferuaten, the prenomen included an epithet referring to Akhenaten (such as 'desired of Wa en Re'). There were no occasions where the 'long' version of the prenomen (Ankhkheperure plus epithet) occurred alongside the nomen 'Smenkhkare', nor was the 'short' prenomen (without epithet) ever found associated with the nomen 'Neferneferuaten'. Additionally, a feminine 't' glyph is often present in the prenomen, nomen, or epithets. Later, the French Egyptologist Marc Gabolde noted that several items from the tomb of Tutankhamun, originally inscribed for Neferneferuaten and initially thought to read "...desired of Akhenaten", when translated correctly, were inscribed as Akhet-en-hyes or "One Who is Beneficial for Her Husband". His reading was later confirmed by James Peter Allen who translated the epithet as "Effective for her husband" which has the same essential meaning.

The use of epithets (or lack of them) to identify the king referenced in an inscription eventually became widely accepted among scholars and regularly cited in their work although a case for exempting a particular inscription or instance will occasionally be argued to support a larger hypothesis. The "female king" identity is also supported by the feminine form of "the justified" under the prenomen Ankhkheperure-Mery-Waenre.

=== Manetho's Aegyptiaca ===
Manetho was an Egyptian priest of the 3rd century BC, in the early years of the Hellenistic period, a thousand years after the Amarna Period. His lost literary work Aegyptiaca (History of Egypt), written in Greek and now known only in fragmentary form from later writers claiming to quote his work, is the sole ancient record available. Because of the deliberate suppression of histories of the Amarna succession by rulers that followed, Manetho's Amarna Period sources were incomplete at best.

Manetho's Epitome, a later epitome (summary) of Manetho's work, describes the late Eighteenth Dynasty succession as Orus or "Amenophis for 30 years 10 months". After Orus, who is most likely Amenhotep III, comes "his daughter Acencheres for 12 years 1 month then her brother Rathotis for 9 years". According to Marc Gabolde, Acencheres is Ankhkheperure with a transcription error converting 2 years, 1 month into the 12 years, 1 month reported (Africanus and Eusebius cite 32 and 16 years for this person). Akhenaten is not even mentioned in the most accurate 18th dynasty regnal list of the epitome of Aegyptiaca compiled by Josephus in Contra Apionem. Most scholars agree that Rathotis refers to Tutankhamun; therefore, the succession order also supports Acencheres as Ankhkheperure. Manetho states that Rathotis is followed by "his son Acencheres for 12 years 5 months, his son Acencheres II for 12 years 3 months", which demonstrates the limits to which Manetho may be relied upon for accuracy about the Amarna Period.

Marc Gabolde theorized that the "Acencheres" referenced by the third century BC Egyptian priest Manetho was a form of "Ankhkheperure". According to Manetho in Aegyptiaca (History of Egypt), the late Eighteenth Dynasty Orus was succeeded by "his daughter Acencheres for 12 years 1 month then her brother Rathotis for 9 years". According to Gabole, a transcription error converted 2 years, 1 month into the 12 years, 1 month reported (Africanus and Eusebius cite 32 and 16 years for this person). Another possibility is that Ankhkheperure Neferneferuaten was another of the Achencheres kings who ruled for 2 years and 5 months or 2 years and 3 months once one deducts a superfluous 10 years from her recorded reign all of which accord well with her highest known date—her Year 3 which implies a minimal reign of 2 to 3 years in the Egyptian dating system.

== Identity ==
By the late20th century, there was "'a fair degree of consensus'" that Neferneferuaten was a female pharaoh and Smenkhkare a separate male pharaoh, particularly among specialists of the period. Many Egyptologists believe she also served as coregent on the basis of the stela and epithets, although a sole reign seems very likely, given that the Pairi inscription is dated using her regnal years. Opinion is more divided on the placement and nature of the reign of Smenkhkare in relation to her.

Most Egyptologists see the two names to indicate two separate individuals and consider this as the simplest and more likely view. Most name changes in the Amarna period involved people incorporating -Aten into their name or removing an increasingly offensive -Amun element.

The focus now shifts to the identity of Neferneferuaten, with each candidate having its own advocate(s), a debate that may never be settled to the satisfaction of all. Akhenaten is known to have died in his 17th year from wine docket evidence found at Amarna.

=== Nefertiti ===
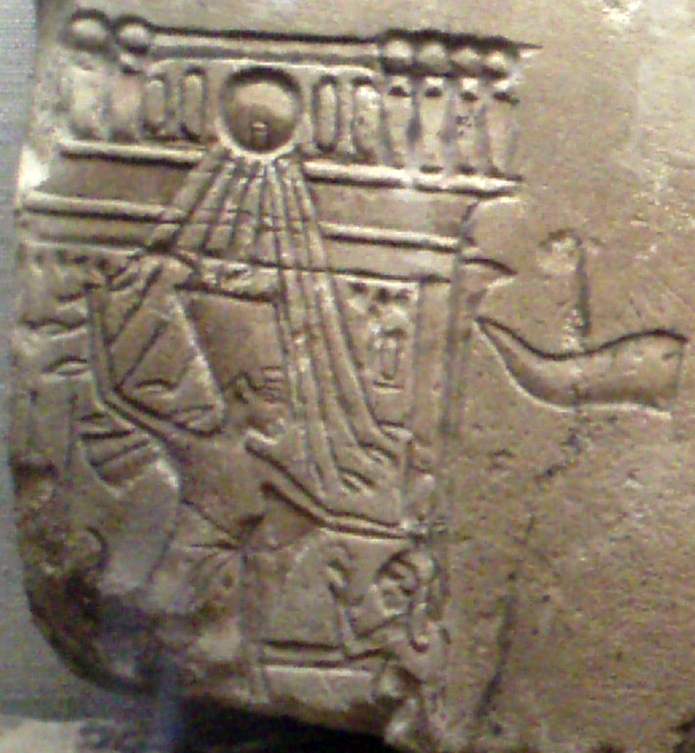
Nefertiti depicted in familiar scene of a king smiting Egypt's enemy

Even among Egyptologists who advocate for the identification of Nefertiti as Neferneferuaten, the exact nature of her reign can vary. Nefertiti was an early candidate for King Neferneferuaten, first proposed in 1973 by J. R. Harris. The apparent use of a portion of her name made her an obvious candidate even before Neferneferuaten's gender was firmly established. Remains of painted plaster bearing the kingly names of Neferneferuaten found in the Northern Palace, long believed to be the residence of Nefertiti, supports the association of Nefertiti as the king. Nefertiti was in the forefront during her husband's reign and even depicted engaging in kingly activities such as smiting the enemies of Egypt. The core premise is that her prominence and power in the Amarna Period was almost unprecedented for a great royal wife, which makes her the most likely and most able female to succeed Akhenaten.

More importantly, Nefertiti is known to have held the title of "Neferneferuaten" during Akhenaten's reign when she was his Great Queen or "The Beautiful One has Come". Until 2012, Nefertiti's last dated depiction was from Year 12 of Akhenaten's reign, which suggested that she had died shortly after. However, she is now known to have still been alive in the second to last year of Akhenaten's reign and still bearing the title of Great Royal Wife, based on an ink inscription dated explicitly to 'Year 16 III Akhet day 15' [of Akhenaten] in a limestone quarry at Dayr Abū Ḥinnis. This inscription would argue against a coregency of more than about a year, if at all, as the inscription attests to Nefertiti's position still as Akhenaten's great royal wife—and not a pharaoh with a royal title—just before the start of Akhenaten's final year.

This affects theories proposed by some Egyptologists, such as Aidan Dodson, who see Neferneferuaten as both a coregent of Akhenaten, a sole ruler, and regent or coregent of Tutankhamun. Despite her highest attested year being Year 3, he suggests she counted her regnal years only after Akhenaten's death, a view put forth by Murnane to account for the lack of double dates in the New Kingdom, even when a coregency is known to exist. Dodson then speculates that she may later have shared Tutankhamun's regnal dating, in effect deferring senior status at least nominally to him. He proposes that Neferneferuaten helped guide the reformation in the early years of Tutankhaten and conjectures that the return to the dominance of the Amun priesthood is the result of her 'rapid adjustment to political reality'. To support the Nefertiti-Tutankhamun coregency, he cites jar handles bearing her cartouche and others bearing those of Tutankhaten from Northern Sinai. This is not a view shared by the excavators, who note that sealings and small objects such as bezel rings from many Eighteenth Dynasty royals including Akhenaten, Ay, Queen Tiye, and Horemheb were found, and that "linking Tutankhamun and Neferneferuaten politically, based on the discovery of their names on amphorae at Tell el-Borg, is unwarranted". Gabolde likewise considered a coregency or regency unlikely.

Van der Perre considers it likely Nefertiti assumed the royal office using the name Neferneferuaten, adopting the throne name briefly used by Smenkhkare in combination with her own name, but that the chance of a co-regency period is slim. References to Akhenaten that were added to her names as epithets, confirm her legitimacy. The epithets changed over time: initially conferring legitimacy, then linking to the deified deceased king, before finally changing to 'Beloved of Aten' and 'the ruler' late in her reign. Furthermore, it has been suggested that Smenkhkare may also be Neferneferuaten, a view still held by a few such as Nicholas Reeves and until 2004 by Dodson. Aidan Dodson, since 2014, now agrees that the female pharaoh Nefereruaten was Nefertiti himself and has written so as such in his 2020 book titled "Nefertiti: Queen and Pharaoh of Egypt".

The Coregency Stela (UC 410), mentioned earlier, might resolve the question if it were not so badly damaged. The name Neferneferuaten replaced Nefertiti's name on it. How the image of Nefertiti was changed to match the new inscription could settle matters if her image was not missing. If her entire image was replaced it would mean Nefertiti was replaced by someone else called King Neferneferuaten and perhaps that she died. If just a new crown was added to her image, it would argue quite strongly that Nefertiti adopted a new name and title. As it is, the scene seems to be another of the royal family including at least Meritaten. Replacing the name Nefertiti with the name King Neferneferuaten in a depiction of the royal family, still seems to favor Nefertiti as the new king.

The primary argument against Nefertiti had been that she likely died sometime after Year 12, which was the last known dated depiction of her until 2012. However, an inscription discovered in 2012 showed that she was still alive in Year 16 of her husband's reign. Evidence put forward to suggest she predeceased Akhenaten includes pieces of an ushabti indicating her title at death was Great Royal Wife; wine dockets from her estate declining and ceasing after Year 13; Meritaten's title as Great Royal Wife alongside Akhenaten's name on items from Tutankhamun's tomb indicating she likely replaced Nefertiti in that role; the floor of the tomb intended for her shows signs of cuts being started for the final placement of her sarcophagus. A single ushabti for Nefertiti seems scant evidence for her death, given there are about 200 shabti for Akhenaten. It is possible the two pieces belonged instead to two separate shabtis, one of Nefertiti and the other of Meritaten. Alternately, it may have been a votive offering placed in the burial of a deceased family member such as Meketaten.

=== Meritaten ===
Rolf Krauss proposed in 1973 that Meritaten was Pharaoh Neferneferuaten. He speculated Meritaten might have ruled with the feminine prenomen 'Ankh-et-kheperure' after Akhenaten's death and before Smenkhkare's accession. In his argument, Smenkhkare then takes the masculine form of her prenomen upon gaining the throne through marriage. Although few Egyptologists endorsed the whole hypothesis, many did accept Meritaten at times as the probable or possible candidate for a female Ankhkheperure ruling for a time after Smenkhkare's death and perhaps, as regent to Tutankhaten.

The primary argument against Meritaten, either as Krauss's pro tempore Ankh-et-kheperure before marriage to Smenkhkare or as Akhenaten's coregent King Neferneferuaten, is that she is well attested as wife and great royal wife to Smenkhkare. For her to have later ruled as king means necessarily, and perhaps incredibly for her subjects, that she stepped down from King to the role of King's Wife. This view places Smenkhkare after Neferneferuaten, which requires the Meryre depiction to be drawn 5–6 years after the 'Durbar' depiction it is alongside, and several years after work on tombs had stopped.

The counter to this argument comes from Marc Gabolde, who offers political necessity as the reason for Meritaten's demotion. He sees the inscribed box (Carter 001k tomb naming her alongside Akhenaten and Neferneferuaten) as depicting Meritaten in simultaneous roles using the name Neferneferuaten as coregent and using her birth name in the role of royal wife to Akhenaten. He has also proposed that the Meryre drawing was executed in advance of an anticipated coronation that ended up not taking place due to his death. Most recently, Gabolde has proposed that Meritaten was raised to coregent of Akhenaten during the final years of his reign and that she succeeds him as interregnum regent using the name Ankhkheperure. He also identifies her as the subject of the Dakhamunzu affair, with the Hittite prince Zannanza ascending the throne as Smenkhkare. As there is no evidence as to when or where he died nor that he was murdered, Gabolde believes that he completed the trip and died only after becoming king. The proposal continues that, after his death, she adopts full pharaonic prerogatives to continue to rule as King Ankhkheperure Neferneferuaten. Since Tutankamun was alive and of royal lineage, Gabolde argues that Meritaten's actions almost certainly must be taken as intending to prevent his ascension to king. The Smenkhkare-Zannanza version garners little support among Egyptologists. With the presence of Tutankhamun, Miller points out Meritaten "would presumably have needed the backing of some powerful supporter(s) to carry out such a scheme as the tahamunzu episode, one is left with the question of why this supporter would have chosen to throw his weight behind such a daring scheme".

Since Nefertiti has been confirmed to be living as late as Year 16 of Akhenaten's reign however, the Meritaten theory becomes less likely because she would no longer be the most senior living person to be at court using either the name Neferneferuaten nor be identified as "Effective for her husband" as the epithet of a ruling female pharaoh. Secondly, both Aidan Dodson and the late Bill Murnane have stressed their opinions that the female ruler Neferneferuaten and Meritaten cannot be the same person. As Dodson writes:

...the next issue is clearly her [i.e., Neferneferuaten's] origins. Cases have been made for her being the former Nefertiti (Harris, Samson and others), Meryetaten (Krauss 1978; Gabolde 1998) and most recently Neferneferuaten-tasherit, [the] fourth daughter of Akheneten (Allen 2006). Of these, Meryetaten's candidature seems fatally undermined by the existence of the KV62 box fragment JE61500, which gives the names and titles of Akhenaten, Neferneferuaten and Meryetaten as clearly separate individuals.

=== Neferneferuaten-tasherit ===
James Allen originally proposed that Pharaoh Neferneferuaten was the same person as Neferneferuaten-tasherit, Akhenaten and Nefertiti's fourth daughter. in 2009. Allen argued that Neferneferuaten-tasherit was the clear answer because the two individuals shared a name and, at the time, it was believed that Nefertiti was dead by the late period of her husband's reign. According to Allen, the 'tasherit' portion of her name may have been dropped, either because it would be unseemly to have a King using 'the lesser' in their name, or it may have already been dropped when Nefertiti died. However, Allen later rejected this theory after additional evidence was published that Nefertiti was alive later in Year 16 of Akhenaten's reign than previously thought. Allen now agrees that this female king was indeed Nefertiti herself with the publication of the Year 16 date showing that Nefertiti was still alive in Akhenaten's second last year of rule in a 2016 Göttinger Miszellen paper.

== General chronology ==
=== Original succession ===
There was previously no broad consensus on the succession order of Smenkhkare and Neferneferuaten. Akhenaten's great royal wife Nefertiti had been last attested as alive in Year 12 of Akhenaten at a public reception of foreign tribute or durbar scene with the other members of the Egyptian royal family both in Amarna Tomb 1 and in the Tomb of Meryre II. The period from the 13th regnal year of Akhenaten to the ascension of Tutankhaten was unclear to modern historians. The reigns of Smenkhkare and Neferneferuaten were very brief and left little monumental or inscriptional evidence to draw a clear picture of political events. Adding to this, Neferneferuaten shares her Ankhkheperure prenomen (throne name) with Smenkhkare, and her nomen (birth name) with Nefertiti, making identification very difficult at times. With little dated evidence to fix their reigns with any certainty, the evidence was subject to interpretation.

Many encyclopedic sources and atlases show Smenkhkare succeeding Akhenaten on the basis of a research tradition dating back to 1845, and some still conflate Smenkhkare with Neferneferuaten. The lack of unique names continued to cause problems in books and papers written before the early 1980s: an object might be said to bear the name "Smenkhkare", when it could also be translated to "Ankhkheperure". Advocates for Smenkhkare as the direct successor of Akhenaten make the case that she is attested as "Great Royal Wife" just before the start of Akhenaten's final regnal year.

Prior to 2014, Neferneferuaten was sometimes thought to have ruled between Akhenaten and Smenkhkare.

=== Revised succession ===
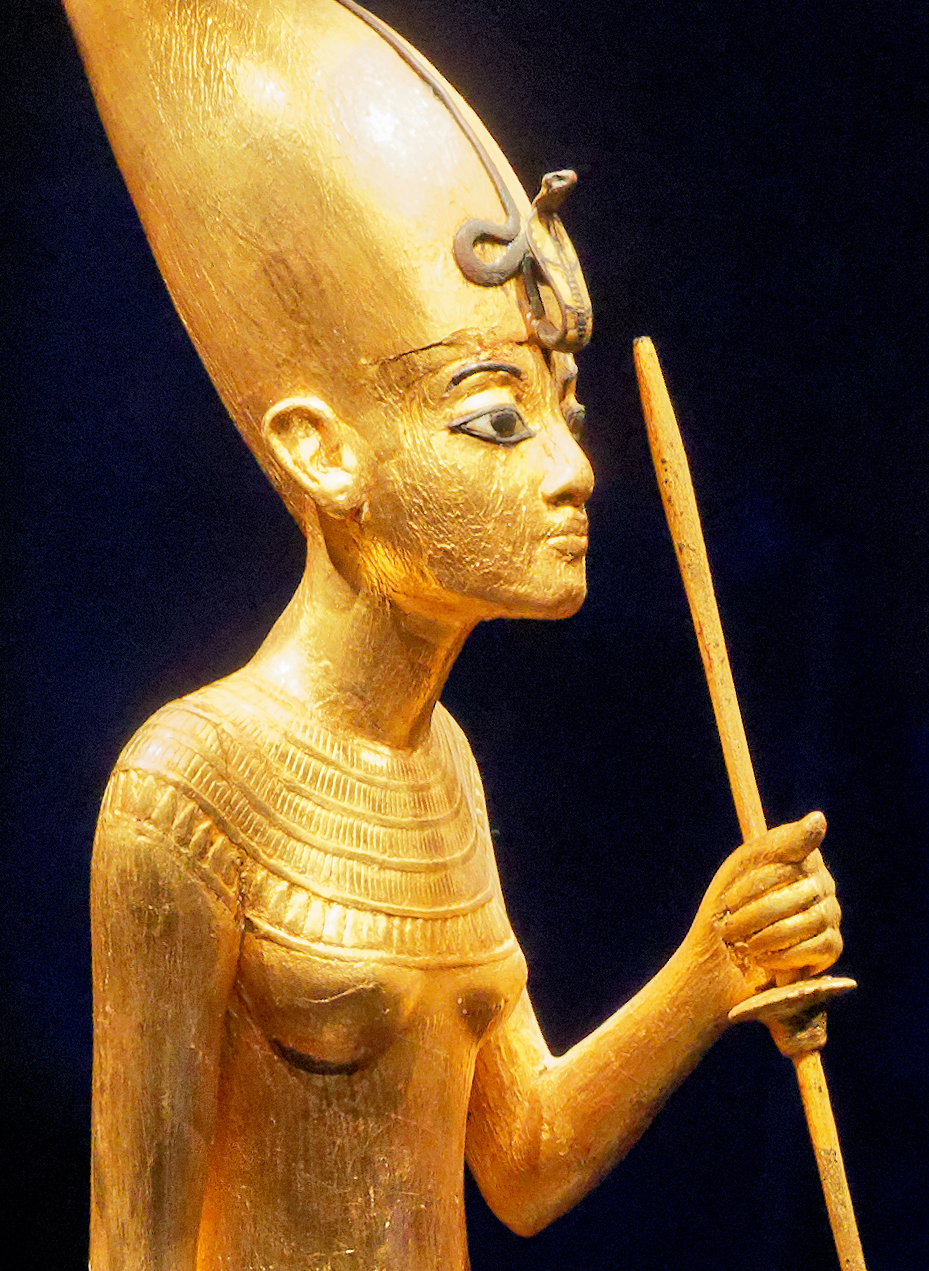
This gilded statuette nominally portrays the male king Tutankhamun on the back of a black leopard (out of frame) but despite the face being reworked, the image shows the figure's feminine breasts, which clearly identifies it as originally belonging to the burial equipment of this king's predecessor, the female pharaoh Neferneferuaten.

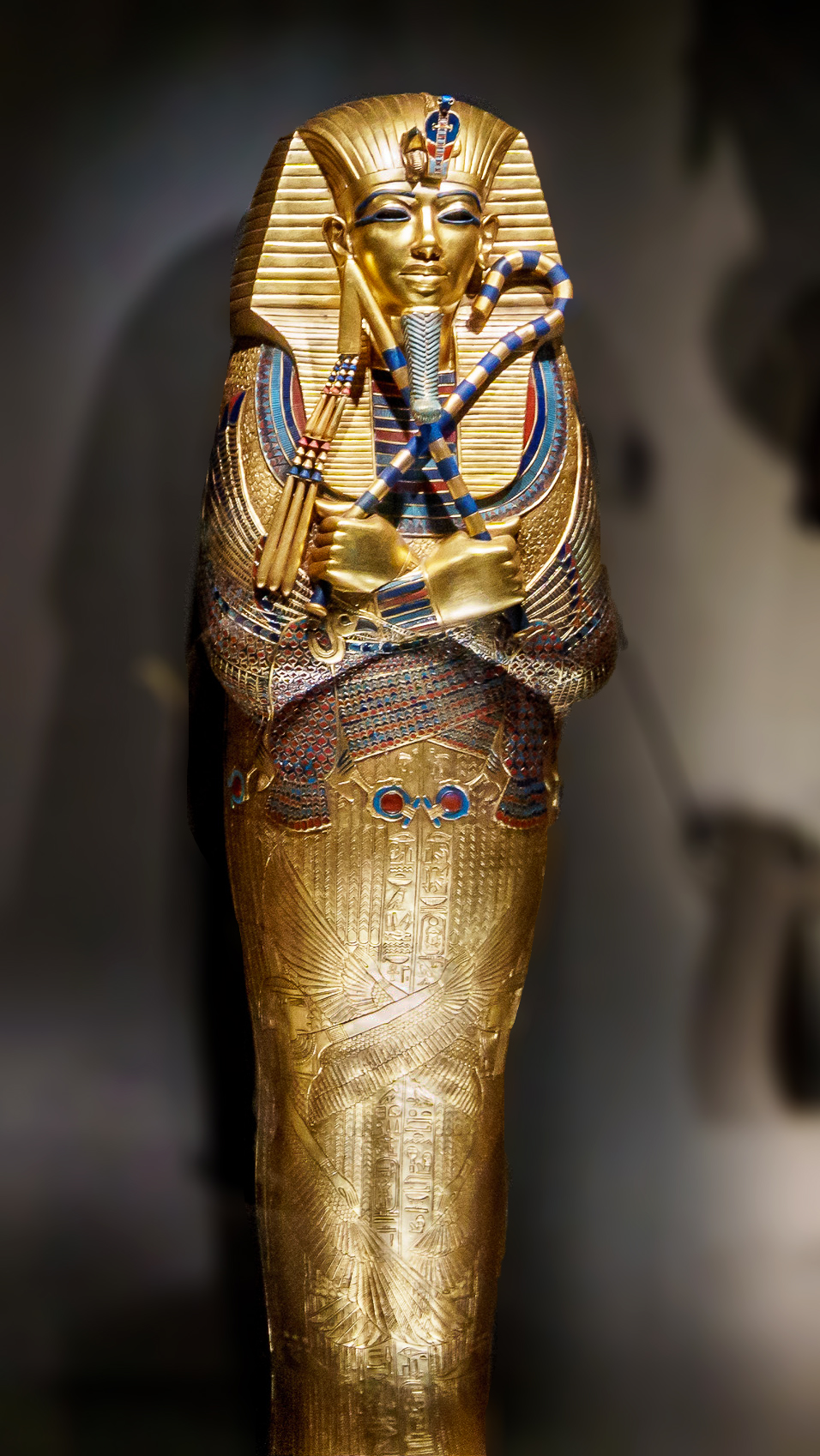
This replica of Tutankhaten's stunning solid gold inner coffin (JE 60671) features distinctly feminine lines of the stomach and hips which identifies it as belonging to the burial equipment of this king's original female predecessor, Neferneferuaten

Marc Gabolde cites the Smenkhkare wine docketto Smenkhkare succeeding Akhenaten. Aidan Dodson proposes that: Smenkhkare did not have an independent reign; that Neferneferuaten must have come after him; that Smenkhkare's reign was entirely that of a coregent; and that Smenkhkare's reign ended in Year 14 or 15 of Akhenaten's reign. Finally, James Peter Allen previously used the wine docket and the strong association of Neferneferuaten with Akhenaten in epithets and on stelae to speculate that both Neferneferuaten and Smenkhkare succeeded Akhenaten, each as a rival claimant.

However, the 2014 publication of a red ochre ink inscription—first discovered in 2012—for Nefertiti at a limestone quarry in Deir Abu Hinnis as "Great Royal Wife" in Regnal Year 16 of Akhenaten makes clear that Nefertiti was still alive and still serving as this King's Great Royal Wife in what was Akhenaten's second to last year as king. The Year 16 ink inscription was translated as:

"Regnal year 16, first month of the inundation season, day 15. May the King of Upper and Lower Egypt live, he who lives of Maat, the Lord of the Two Lands Neferkheperure Waenre, l.p.h. the Son of Re, who lives of Maat, the Lord of the Crowns Akhenaten, l.p.h., whose life span is long, living forever and ever, the King's Great Wife, his beloved, the lady of the two lands Neferneferuaten-Nefertiti, living forever and ever. Beloved of Re, the ruler of the two horizons, who rejoices in the horizon in his name of Re ///, who comes as the Aten. the /// the work of the Mansion of the Aten, under the authority of the king's scribe Penthu, under the authority of overseer of work///."

The discovery that Nefertiti was still alive in the second last Year of Akhenaten—his 16th Year—strongly indicates that she was most likely the female king Neferneferuaten and the direct successor to Akhenaten. This would require Akhenaten having chosen Smenkhkare as his successor in his Year 12. Smenkhkare died before Akhenaten, however, forcing Akhenaten to elevate Nefertiti to the throne as Neferneferuaten to secure his legacy. Nozomu Kawai writes:

...it can be suggested that Akhenaten appointed Nefertiti as his coregent after the demise of his male coregent, Smenkhkare. Smenkhkare's widowed queen, Meritaten, seems to have kept her title as his great royal wife. Simultaneously, Neferneferuaten obtained another epithet, Axt-n-H(j)=s, "One Who is Beneficial for Her Husband", which Gabolde used to prove this king's female identity beyond doubt... However, it is worth noting that this coregency does not seem to have lasted a long time. After Akhenaten's death, Neferneferuaten continued in power as sole ruler for approximately three years. During her sole reign, Neferneferuaten also obtained new epithets. She replaced the name of Akhenaten with references to the Aten in her prenomen and nomen. The epithet of her prenomen was then mry-Itn, "Beloved of Aten", while the epithet of her nomen became HoA-mAat, "Ruler of Truth".

James P. Allen wrote below in his updated 2016 Göttinger Miszellen paper:

The evidence indicates Smenkhkare ruled only about a year at most....Smenkhkare's premature death probably no later than Akhenaten's Regnal Year 14 left only the one-to-four year old heir Tutankhuaten as putative heir....Tutankhamun must have been considered too young to be named coregent in his father's stead....To safeguard Tutankhamun's accession, Akhenaten also appointed a female coregent Ankheperure Neferneferuaten, to oversee the transition and probably to instruct him in the new religion. In 2009, I argued that this coregent was Akhenaten's fourth daughter, Neferneferuaten Tasherit, both because it seemed a logical progression in his attempts to produce a son within each of his daughters as they reached puberty, and because evidence was lacking that the other Neferneferuaten, Nefertiti, was still alive in Akhenaten's final years. The Year 16 inscription noted [for the existence of Akhenaten's wife] at the beginning of this article solves the latter problem, and I (and my students) now think it likeliest that the coregent was in fact, Nefertiti. The arguments for this are more compelling than they are for the daughter...Since Nefertiti was still chief queen in Regnal Year 16 [of Akhenaten], her Year 3 as pharaoh must have occurred two years after Akhenaten's death, and it was within those two years that the first steps towards reconciliation with Amun occurred. While little is known about the daughter other than her existence, Nefertiti had assumed pharaonic roles and prerogatives throughout Akhenaten's reign, and the occasional epithet in her nomen Akhet-en-hyes "Beneficial for her husband," both reflects a relationship that had already existed and mirrors Akhenaten's own nomen [Akh-en-Iten or 'The one who is beneficial to the Aten'], which described his relationship not only with his god but also with his predecessor, the Tjehen-Aten "dazzling Aten," Amenhotep III. Moreover, if as now seems probable, the appointment of a female coregent was intended not to ensure her own succession but that of the young Tutankhuaten, then it is far more likely that Akhenaten would have turned to the older more experienced woman who had served as his virtual co-ruler than to a young daughter who had just reached puberty....

That most of Tutankhamun's funerary equipment was originally made for or inscribed with the name of the female king Neferneferuaten strongly suggests that Tutankhamun, in fact, directly succeeded Neferneferuaten on the throne after the female king died. With the discovery of so many objects from the female king Neferneferuaten's own funerary equipment—carved in her name or bearing distinct feminine faces—in Tutankhamun's own burial, many Egyptologists today such as Chris Naunton, Aidan Dodson, Athena van der Perre, James Peter Allen since 2016 and Nozomu Kawai accept that Neferneferuaten was Tutankhamun's predecessor—or coregent in the case of Dodson—and that this female ruler was Nefertiti.

Athena van der Perre notes:

After the death of Semenkhkare, the royal family had to face the problem of succession again....At some point after Semenkhkare's disappearance, Akhenaten must have decided that there was only one person capable of reigning and tutoring Tutankhaten after his death. The new regent would use the name Ankhkheperure Neferneferuaten. The reign of "king" Neferneferuaten is actually better documented than that of Semenkhkare....The name is attested in Amarna, Thebes and Tell el-Borg. Mud jar sealings referring to the "(wine of the) estate of Neferneferuaten, beloved of Waenra," were also discovered in Saqqara. Nefertiti, who already played an important role in Amarna, and already bore the name Neferneferuaten, is in my view the most likely candidate for this function. Her name was extended with epithets inside the cartouches; Ankhkheperure mr.y X Neferneferuaten mr.y Y, where X and Y could differ. After her husband's death, Nefertiti would reign the country herself. During a short period, probably near the beginning of her reign, she used the female variant "Ankhetkheperure." The epithets were used to show the affection between Akhenaten and his wife and to confirm the legitimacy of her position. The epithet Ꜣḫ.t n hy=s "who is effective for her husband," clearly confirms the femininity of "King" Neferneferuaten....Titles such as ḥm.t nsw.t (wr.t) and mw.t-nsw.t continue to be used by queens after the accession of another king, so Meritaten kept the title she gained while being married to Semenkhkare. This implies that the only female person to whom the epithet may apply is in fact Nefertiti, who was the actual wife of Akhenaten. During her sole reign, Nefertiti also used other epithets. She replaced the name of her former husband with references to Aten and Akhetaten in her prenomen and she added the title "ḥḳꜢ " in her nomen.

Nozomu Kawai observes:

The numerous objects of Neferneferuaten in Tutankhamun's tomb are difficult to understand. Since Neferneferuaten was the direct predecessor of Tutankhamun, the latter should have been responsible for the former's burial. Reeves and van der Perre suggested that Neferneferuaten was originally buried at Amarna and later moved to Thebes by Tutankhamun and the new tomb might have been too small for all her funerary equipment and thus, the remaining objects were modified for Tutankhamun. However, I would rather propose that Tutankhamun did not give Neferneferuaten credit as his predecessor and did not bury her properly as king....Instead, the remaining unused funerary equipment prepared for her burial was eventually appropriated for Tutankhamun's [own] burial.

The archaeological evidence suggests this Amarna-era 18th Dynasty chronology table below is closer to the truth since it agrees with the historical facts.

King	Approx years
Amenhotep IV	17 years
Ankhkheperure Smenkhkare (coregent)	2 years
Ankhkheperure Neferneferuaten	2 years
Tutankhaten/Tutankhamun	9 years
Ay	4 years
Horemheb	14 years

== Key evidence ==
Several Year 1 and Year 2 dates associated to a king "Ankhkheperure" with the use of title of the chief wine vintner named hrj b3h found at Amarna likely belong to Neferneferuaten's reign since Akhenaten only founded Amarna in his 5th Regnal Year and the same vintner's title is also recorded on wine vintages corresponding from Years 13 through 17 of Akhenaten's reign; therefore, the use of the wine with this vintner's title must belong to the immediate post-Akhenaten period. Prior to Year 13 of Akhenaten, the chief vintner held the title of hrj k3mw which is attested when wine labels from Years 5 to Year 12 of his reign were available at Amarna. Under Year 1 of either Neferneferuaten or Tutankhamun, the chief wine vintner's title of hrj k3mw "was reintroduced and continued to be used as wine jar labels in the tomb of Tutankhamun show". While Tutankhamun likely abandoned Amarna almost immediately upon his reign, Neferneferuaten still ruled Egypt from Amarna during her short 2–3 year reign. The use of wine from the last years of Akhenaten's reign in Year 1 and 2 of Ankhkheperure Neferneferuaten would not be unexpected. The late Egyptologist Erik Hornung, also noted in 2006 that:

"A regnal year 3 is also attested at Amarna in the labels on vessels for various commodities. Year 3 continues year 1 and 2 of King 'Ankhkheperure' as labels of year 2 and 3 belonging to a single delivery of olive oil prove (Hornung, Untersuchungen, 88–89). There are only 3 wine jar labels of year 3 which cannot represent a complete vintage, because the yearly mean number of wine jar labels is 50 to 60. The disproportion is explicable if the change from regnal year 2 to 3 occurred during the sealing of the wine jars."

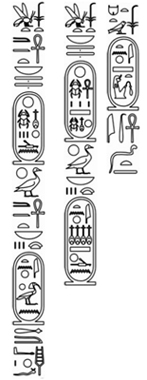
Inscription from the Carter 001k artifact, a box from Tutankhamun's tomb naming Neferneferuaten's cartouche in the middle column.

Unlike Smenkhkare, there are no known named depictions of Neferneferuaten; she is only securely attested in inscriptions. Of particular interest is the lid of a box (Carter 001k) inscribed with the following:

King of Upper and Lower Egypt, Living in Truth, Lord of the Two Lands, Neferkheperure-Waenre

Son of Re, Living in Truth, Lord of Crowns, Akhenaten, Great in his duration
King of Upper and Lower Egypt, Lord of the Two Lands, Ankhkheperure Mery-Neferkheperre
Son of Re, Lord of Crowns, Neferneferuaten Mery-Waenre

Great Royal Spouse, Meritaten, May she Live Forever

The most definitive inscription attesting to Neferneferuaten is a long Year 3 hieratic inscription or graffito in the tomb of Pairi (TT139) written by a scribe named Pawah:

Regnal year 3, third month of Inundation, day 10. The King of Upper and Lower Egypt, Lord of the Two Lands Ankhkheperure Beloved of Aten, the Son of Re Neferneferuaten Beloved of Waenre. Giving worship to Amun, kissing the ground to Wenennefer by the lay priest, scribe of the divine offerings of Amun in the Mansion [temple] of Ankhkheperure in Thebes, Pawah, born to Yotefseneb. He says:
"My wish is to see you, O lord of persea trees! May your throat take the north wind, that you may give satiety without eating and drunkenness without drinking. My wish is to look at you, that my heart might rejoice, O Amun, protector of the poor man: you are the father of the one who has no mother and the husband of the widow. Pleasant is the utterance of your name: it is like the taste of life... [etc.]
"Come back to us, O lord of continuity. You were here before anything had come into being, and you will be here when they are gone. As you caused me to see the darkness that is yours to give, make light for me so that I can see you...
"O Amun, O great lord who can be found by seeking him, may you drive off fear! Set rejoicing in people's heart(s). Joyful is the one who sees you, O Amun: he is in festival every day!"
For the Ka of the lay priest and scribe of the temple of Amun in the Mansion of Ankhkheperure, Pawah, born to Yotefseneb: "For your Ka! Spend a nice day amongst your townsmen." His brother, the outline draftsman Batchay of the Mansion of Ankhkheperure.

Nicholas Reeves sees this graffito as a sign of a "new phase" of the Amarna revolution, with Ankhkheperure Neferneferuaten "taking a decidedly softer line" toward the Amun priesthood. Therefore, Neferneferuaten might have been the Amarna-era ruler who first reached an accommodation with the Amun priests and reinstated the cult of Amun—rather than Tutankhamun as previously thought—since her own mortuary temple was located in Thebes, the religious capital of the Amun priesthood and Amun priests were now working within it. However, Egypt's political administration was still situated at Amarna rather than Thebes under Neferneferuaten's reign.

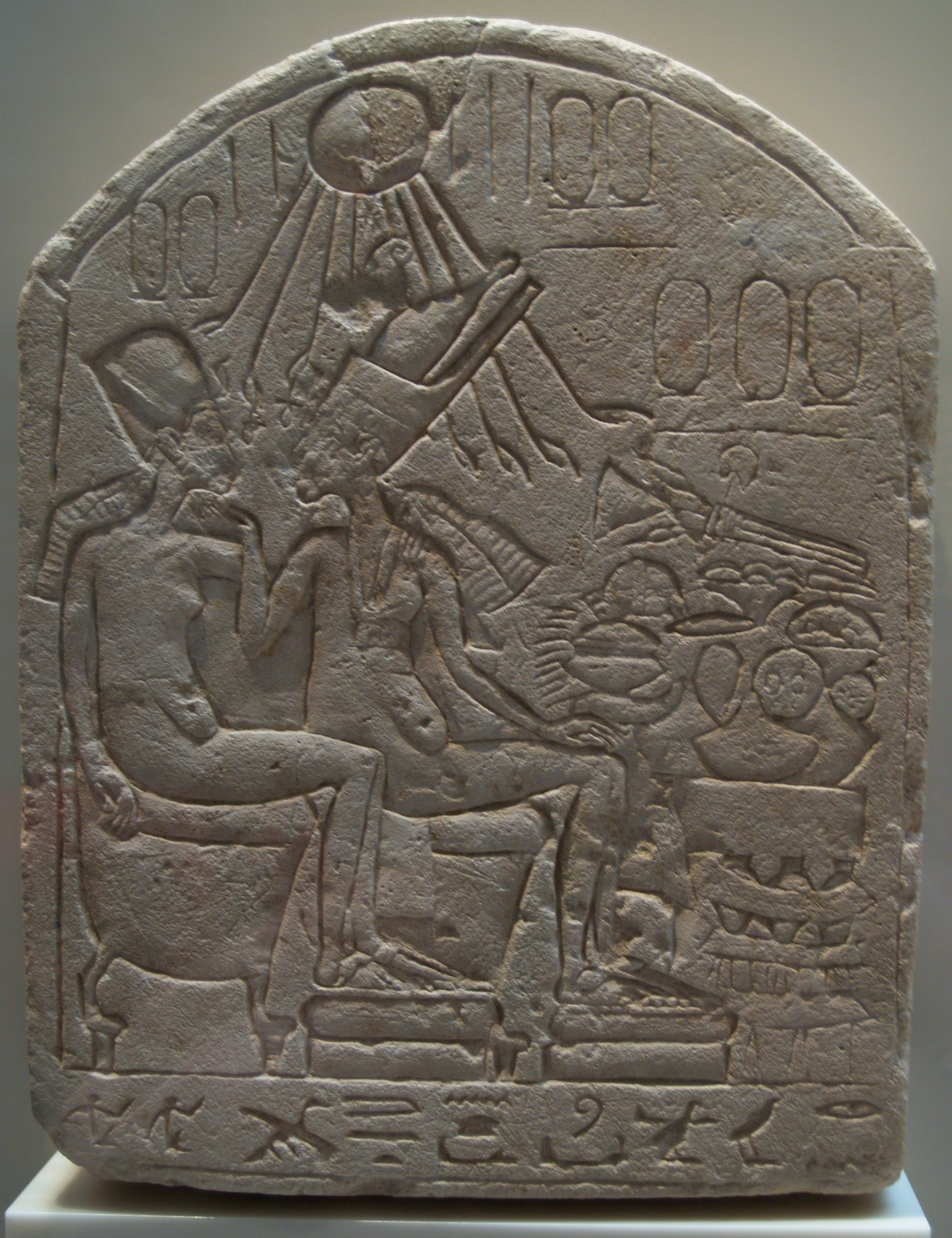
Two crowned kings are depicted on Berlin Stele 17813, a female king (left) is caressing Akhenaten, Ägyptisches Museum und Papyrussammlung, Neues Museum, Berlin

There are several stele depicting two kings—with each wearing a different traditional king's crown—in various familiar, almost intimate scenes. All of them are unfinished or uninscribed and some are defaced. These include:

- An unfinished stele (#17813, Berlin) depicts two royal figures in a familiar, if not intimate, pose. One figure wears the double crown, while the other wears a headpiece which is similar to that from the familiar Nefertiti bust, but is the Khepresh or "blue crown" worn by a king. Aidan Dodson cites this stele to support the idea that Nefertiti may have acted as coregent, as indicated by the crown, but not entitled to full pharaonic honors such as the double cartouche.

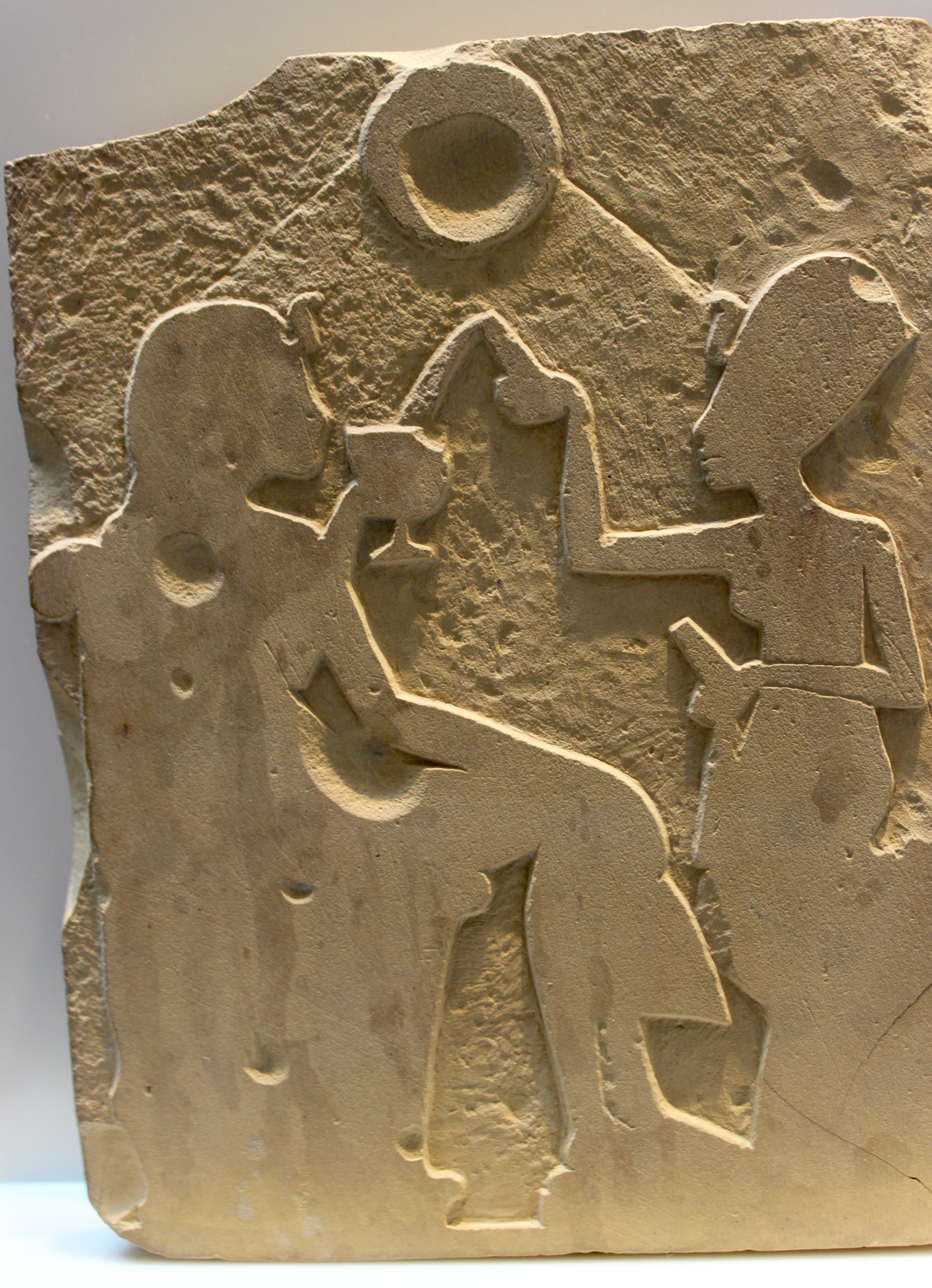
A female king (right), usually identified as Nefertiti, wearing the blue crown, while affectionately pouring water for Akhenaten, Ägyptisches Museum und Papyrussammlung, Altes Museum, Berlin

- Berlin 25574 depicts what clearly seems to be Akhenaten and Nefertiti wearing her flat top headpiece. They are accompanied by four empty cartouches—enough for two kings, one of which seems to have been squeezed in. Reeves sees this as an important item in the case for Nefertiti. When the stele was started, she was great royal wife and thus portrayed with the flat top headpiece. She was elevated to coregent shortly afterward and a fourth cartouche was squeezed in to accommodate two kings.
- Flinders Petrie discovered seven limestone fragments of a private stele in 1891, now in the Petrie Museum, U.C.410 sometimes called the Coregency Stela. One side bears the double cartouche of Akhenaten alongside that of Ankhkheperure mery-Waenre Neferneferuaten Akhet-en-hyes ("effective for her husband"), which had been carved over the single cartouche of Nefertiti.

The clues may point to a female coregent, but the unique situation of succeeding kings using identical throne names may have resulted in a great deal of confusion.

=== Possible sole reign ===
Allen later showed that Neferneferuaten's epithets were of three types or sets. They were usually in the form of "desired of ...", but were occasionally replaced by "effective for her husband". In a few cases, the names can be followed by 'justified' using feminine attributes. The term 'justified' (maet kheru) is a common indicator that the person referenced is dead; a similar reference associated with Hatshepsut in the tomb of Penyati is taken to indicate she had recently died. Finally, a few of Neferneferuaten's cartouches bear unique epithets not associated with Akhenaten at all. These include "desired of the Aten" and "The Ruler". Allen concluded that the strong affiliation with Akhenaten in the epithets and the number of them made it likely that Neferneferuaten had been his coregent and therefore, preceded Smenkhkare. The "effective..." epithets, then represent a period during which Akhenaten was incapacitated, but may also date from a time after Akhenaten's death. Finally, the less common 'Akhenaten-less' versions represented a period of sole reign for Neferneferuaten.

Allen offers a possible explanation for the use of the same throne name by two successive kings. He suggested that the almost constant references to Akhenaten may be proclamations of legitimacy on the part of Neferneferuaten, with the epithets functioning to assert her as Akhenaten's chosen successor or coregent. This implies there may have been resistance to the choice of Neferneferuaten, resistance was anticipated. This appears to be supported by her funerary items being usurped to deny her a king's burial. He suggests that adoption of the throne name Ankhkheperure by Smenkhkare was "to emphasize the legitimacy of Smenkh-ka-re's claim against that of Akhenaton's "chosen" (/mr/) coregent". That is, a division in the royal house put Smenkhkare on the throne as a rival king to Neferneferuaten. This was offered as a simple and logical reading of the evidence to explain the nature of the epithets, the use of identical prenomens by successive kings and that she was denied a royal burial. However, with no dated evidence of rival or contemporaneous kings it remains conjecture.

However, since Smenkhkare disappears from the political scene late in Akhenaten's reign and Neferneferuaten instead appears, the most likely explanation is that Smenkhkare—who is attested in an unfinished durbar scene from the Tomb of Meryre II (TA2) at Amarna dated to Year 12 of Akhenaten—must have died perhaps 1 or 2 years after since this relief scene was never finished by the craftsman. Athena Van der Perre observes that:

After the death of Semenkhkare, the royal family had to face the problem of succession again. Akhenaten was left with two royal wives (Nefertiti and Meritaten) and one possible future successor, who was still too young to reign (Tutankhaten [ie. Tutankhamun]). At some point after Semenkhkare's disappearance, Akhenaten must have decided that there was only one person capable of reigning and tutoring Tutankhaten after his death. The new regent would use the name Ankhkheperure Neferneferuaten. The reign of "king" Neferneferuaten is actually better documented than that of Semenkhkare. Several attestations were found, revealing some interesting facts about this king's reign. The name is attested in Amarna, Thebes and Tell el-Borg. Mud jar sealings referring to the "(wine of the) estate of Neferneferuaten, beloved of Waenra", were also discovered in Saqqara. Nefertiti, who already played an important role in Amarna, and already bore the name Neferneferuaten, is in my view the most likely candidate for this function....After her husband's death, Nefertiti would reign the country herself.

The Egyptologists, Rolf Krauss, Athena Van Der Perre and Nozomu Kawai both assign the female king Neferneferuaten an independent reign of between 2 and 3 years between Akhenaten and Tutankhamun.

Athena Van Der Perre concludes:

The attestations of the name confirm the reign of Neferneferuaten, which, if this was Nefertiti, could not have started until after the 1st month of the 16th year of Akhenaten, as has been shown in the quarry inscription at Deir Abū Ḥinnis. So far, no evidence has been found about the queen's demise. The most likely possibility is that she died after reigning at least 3 years. After her death, Tutankhaten―now a boy approximately 8 years old―would start his own reign. With no queen-mother left to guide him, the actual power came into the hands of a small group of high officials at the court.

== Reuse of Neferneferuaten's funerary equipment for Tutankhamun's burial ==
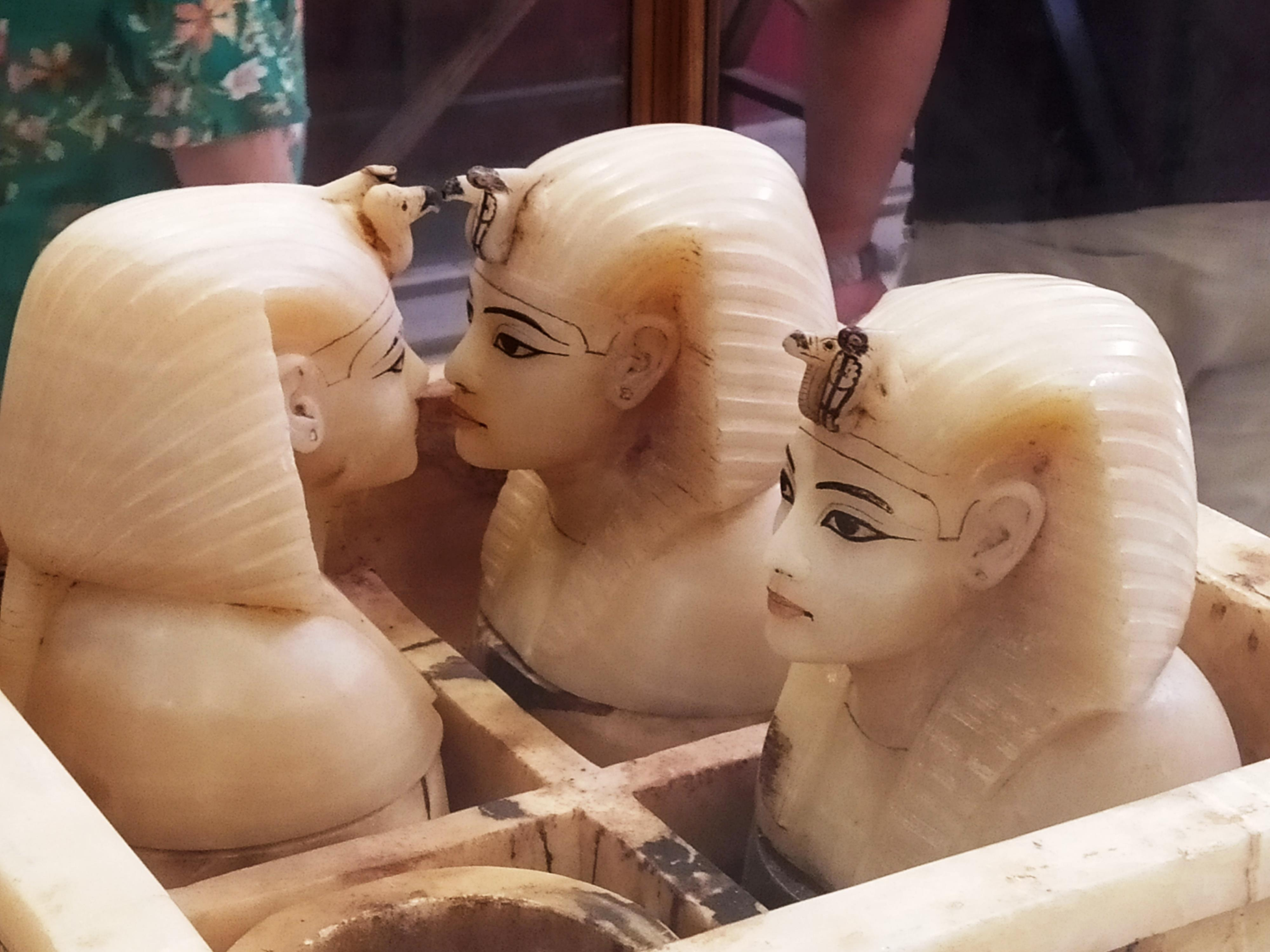
The faces of the canopic jars of Tutankhamun have distinctively female features with the holes in the ear lobes being fully pierced--a feature which identifies the original owner as an adult female since post-pubescent adult male pharaohs did not wear earrings.

According to Nicholas Reeves, almost 80% of Tutankhamun's burial equipment from KV62 was derived from Neferneferuaten's original funerary goods, including the gold funerary mask, middle coffin, canopic jars, several of the gilded shrine panels, shabti-figures, boxes and chests, and royal jewelry, and adapted for use after his unexpected early death. In 2015, Reeves published evidence showing that an earlier cartouche on Tutankhamun's famous gold mask reads, "Ankheperure mery-Neferkheperure" or (Ankheperure beloved of Akhenaten); therefore, the mask originally was made for Nefertiti, Akhenaten's great royal wife, who used the royal name Ankheperure when she assumed the throne after her husband's death.

This development implies that either Neferneferuaten was deposed in a struggle for power, possibly deprived of a royal burial as a king by Tutankhamun's officials, or that she died a natural death but was not buried with her own funerary equipment—by Tutankhamun's officials when Tutankhamun succeeded her as king since Tutankhamun was the officially recognised heir to the throne but Neferneferuaten (ie. Nefertiti) refused to step aside due to the Boy King's relative youth. As Nozomu Kawai concludes:

The fact that a number of objects found in Tutankhamun's tomb had been made for the burial of Neferneferuaten, adapted and reinscribed for Tutankhamun's use, implies that Tutankhaten and his entourage did not want to recognize the preceding reign. Neferneferuaten had assumed sole reign despite the fact that Tutankhaten, the crown prince, was the legitimate successor. Instead of giving up her kingship to a young boy, Neferneferuaten may have wished to continue her sole rule not only because she was already reigning, but also because Tutankhaten was just a boy between five and 10 years old. Although Neferneferuaten began restoring the cults of Amun and other deities she also simultaneously maintained the cult of Aten at Amarna, resulting in a dissatisfied faction of [royal] officials [such as Ay and Horemheb] and priests who advocated a quick return to orthodoxy. When Neferneferuaten's reign ended, probably after about three years, Tutankhaten and Akhenaten's third daughter Ankhesenpaaten were the only surviving members of the Amarna royal family.

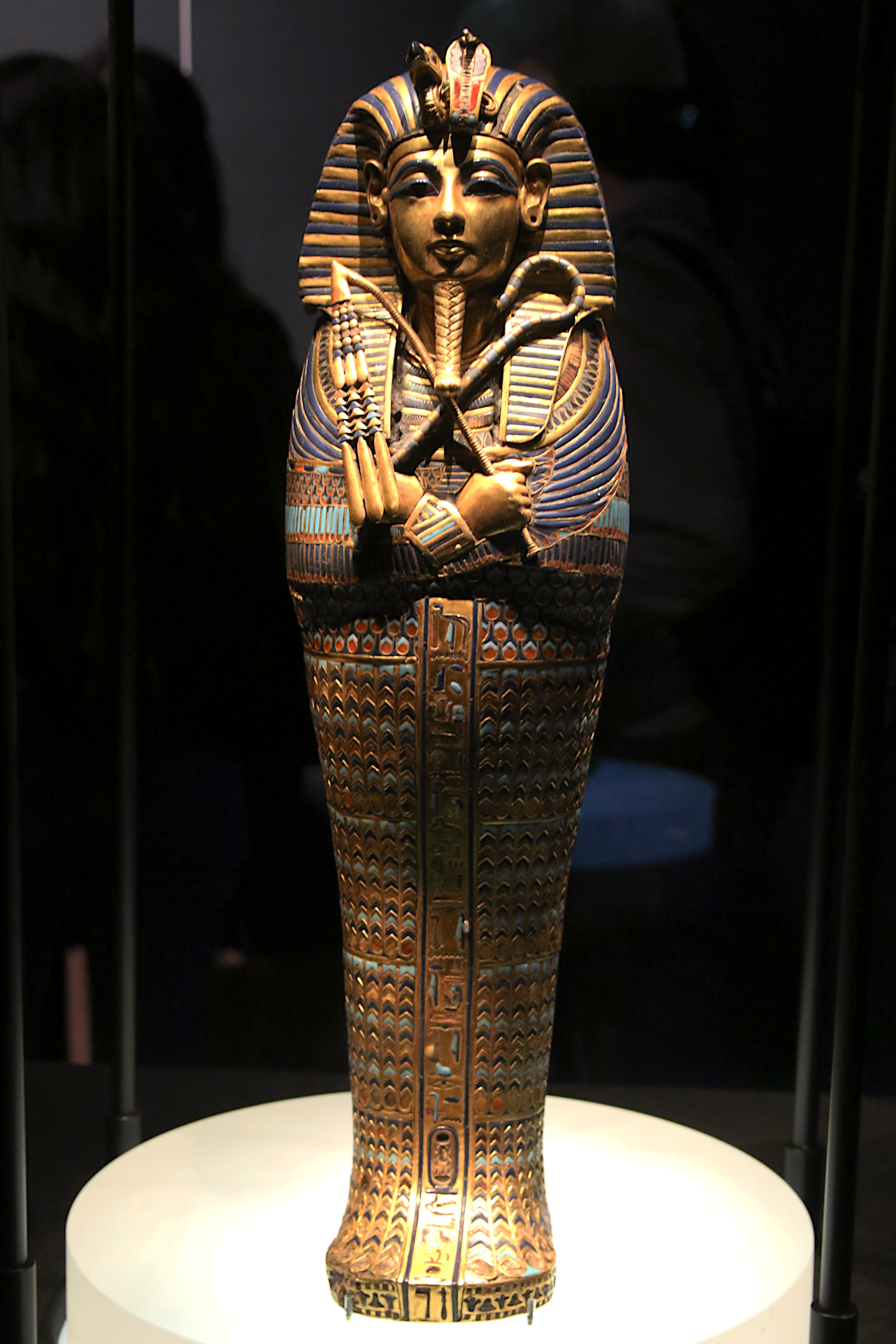
A miniature canopic coffin of Tutankhamun. Traces of Neferneferuaten's cartouches were identified underneath the cartouches of Tutankhamun in the interior of his four miniature golden canopic coffins

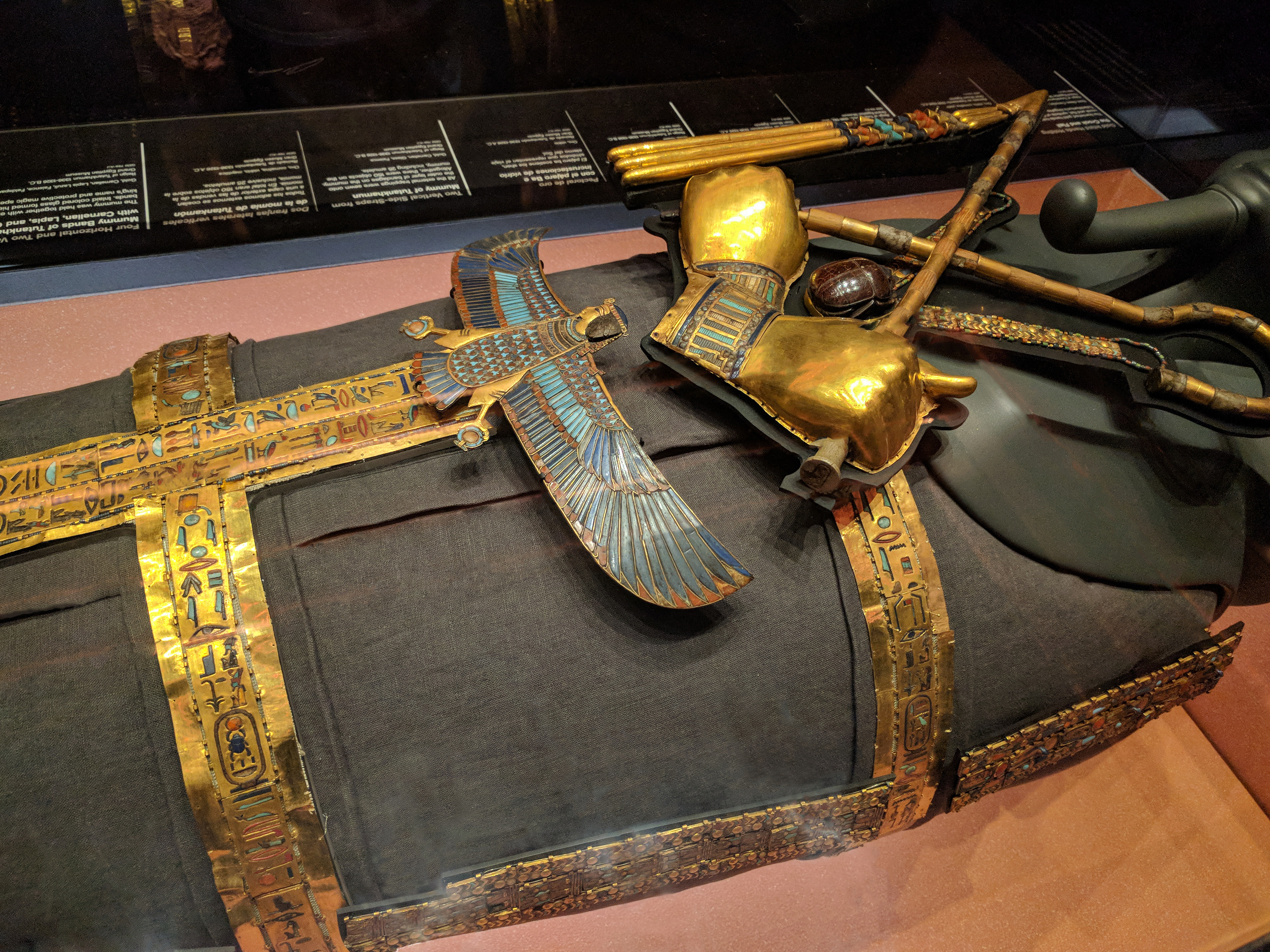
The external trappings of Tutankhamun's mummy (the gold hands, the crook and flail, a gold chain which hung from the Ba-bird and a series of eight golden mummy bands) also held a spelling of Neferneferuaten's prenomen: "Ankhkheperure-Meryt-Neferkheperure"

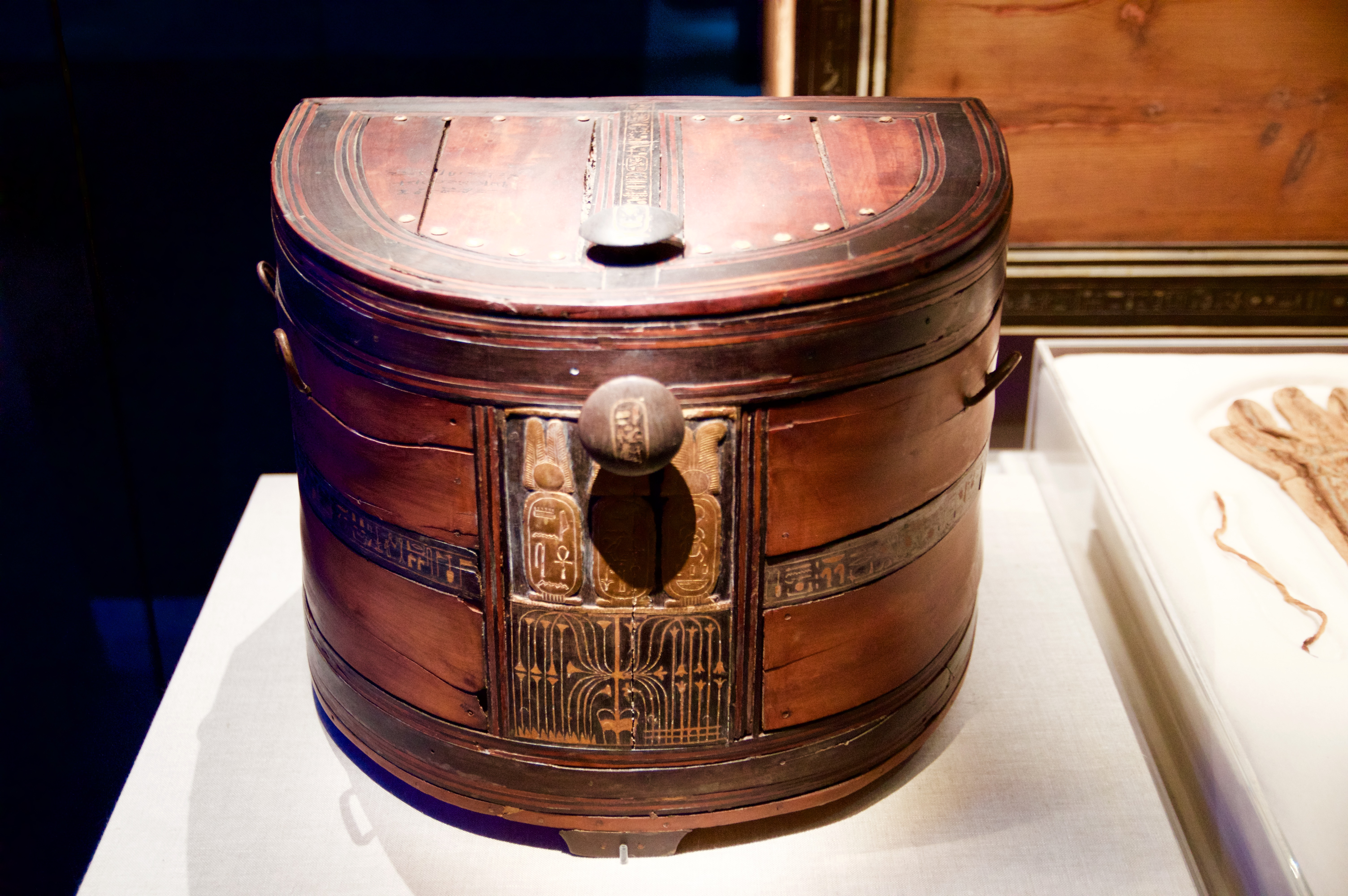
The round-fronted chest (Cairo JE 61495) from the antechamber of Tutankhamun's tomb. The knob on the chest that contains Tutankhamun's cartouche had been written over the name of Neferneferuaten

The golden Nut pectoral (Carter no. 261p1) or (Cairo JE61944) was reused for the funeral of Tutankhamun. Howard Carter noted that Tutankhamun's cartouche replaced earlier ones containing the name of Akhenaten. Marc Gabolde successfully demonstrated that the original cartouches reinscribed with Tutankhamun's nomen and prenomen were those of Neferneferuaten with the variation of Ankhkheperure-Mery-Waenre and Neferneferuaten-Akhetenhies "One Who is Beneficial for Her Husband," proving Neferneferuaten was a female king who was at the same time the wife of Akhenaten.

The main inscription consists of an adaptation of the formula 777b from the Pyramid Texts, indicating the return to religious orthodoxy that the country was undergoing when the pectoral was made. Evidence from the pectoral suggests that Neferneferuaten was a female king during the restoration of orthodoxy following Akhenaten's death.

Numerous items in Tutankhamun's tomb (KV62) were originally inscribed for Neferneferuaten with her royal name or her royal epithet. Among them is Carter 261p(1), a stunning gold pectoral depicting the goddess Nut. Other items include the stone sarcophagus, mummy wrappings, royal figurines; canopic items (chest, coffinettes, and jar stoppers), various bracelets and even shabti figures. These include:

- "Inscribed Strip from the Lid of a Box (GEM 354, JE 61500, Carter no. 1k)" which refers to "Neferneferuaten beloved of Waenre".
- Box (Carter no. 79+574) originally bore an inscription of the prenomen and nomen of Neferneferuaten as well as the name of Meritaten. It was later altered for Tutankhamun and Ankhesenamun.
- a pair of blue bracelets of Akhenaten and Neferneferuaten (Carter no. 620 [41, 42]) which still bear these king's royal names discovered in the Annex of Tutankhamun's tomb.
- three gold sequins of Neferneferuaten assumed to be found from the Tomb of Tutankhamun (now in the National Museums of Scotland, Edinburgh A.1959.451) "though none is recorded by Carter"
- The External Trapping of Tutankhamun's Mummy (Carter no. 256b) include Neferneferuaten's prenomen Ankhkheperure-Meryt-Neferkheperure.
- A round fronted box chest (Carter No. 79, Cairo JE 61495) bears a box knob which was discovered in the Antechamber of Tomb KV 62. Tutankhamun's cartouche had been superimposed over the name of a royal predecessor, Neferneferuaten.
- Moreover, Tutankhamun's solid gold, innermost coffin (Carter 255, JE 60671) features "distinctly feminine lines of the stomach and hips—an evident carry-over from its original [female] owner, Neferneferuaten".
- The gilded statuette of Tutankhamun riding a leopard shows this figure with women's breasts—which clearly identifies this object as belonging to the original burial equipment of this king's predecessor—the female pharaoh Neferneferuaten.
- Tutankhamun's canopic jar lids feature distinctively female features such as fully pierced holes in the ear lobes—a feature which identifies the original owner as an adult female because post-pubescent adult male pharaohs did not wear earrings according to Nicholas Reeves. The gold canopic coffins also included traces of Neferneferuaten's cartouches beneath Tutankhamun's cartouches. Marc Gabolde and James P. Allen discovered the epithet Axt-n-H(j)=s, "One Who is Beneficial for Her Husband" known in Neferneferuaten's nomen on these canopic coffins."

== Online presentation regarding Neferneferuaten ==
- Tutankhamun's Reign: What New Evidence Reveals Youtube presentation by Nozomu Kawai (Kanazawa University) at the Museo Egizio 18 December 2023 (see 14:18 to 18:48)
- KS2 Understanding the Reigns of Tutankhamun and his predecessors from the objects in the Tomb of Tutankhamun Youtube presentation by Nozomu Kawai (Kanazawa University) at the Centro de História da Universidade de Lisboa in 2023 (see 09:00 to 44:00)
