= Coregency Stela =

Ancient Egyptian stela

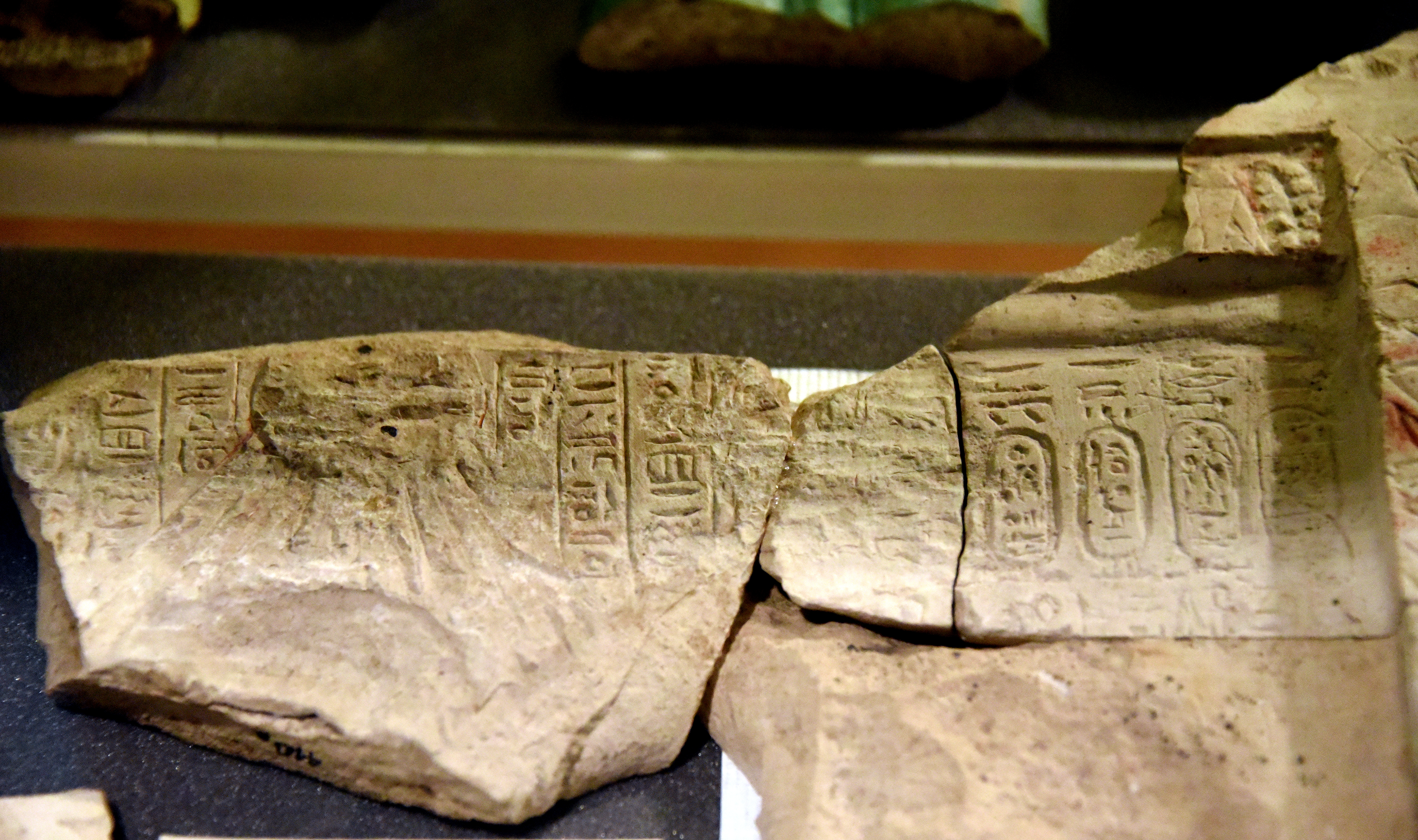
- Material: Limestone
- Created: c. 1350 BC
- Discovered: Minya, Egypt
- Present location: Petrie Museum, England, United ingdom

The Coregency Stela is an ancient Egyptian stela dating from the late 18th Dynasty of Egypt. It consists of seven limestone fragments, which were found in a tomb at Amarna. The tablet shows the figures of Amenhotep IV, Nefertiti, and Meritaten. At some time after the stela was made, Nefertiti's name had been chiselled out and was replaced with Ankhkheperure Neferneferuaten, the name of Amenhotep IV's co-regent. At the same time Meritaten's name was replaced with that of Ankhesenamun, Amenhotep IV and Nefertiti's third daughter.

The stela might shed light on the events of the little-known late-Amarna Period (14th century BC) and the question of Amenhotep IV's immediate succession. Restoration and interpretation of the stela vary, but it has been suggested that it supports the claim that Nefertiti should be identified as Akhenaten co-regent and successor.

The stela is currently in the Petrie Museum in London.
