= Marc Gabolde =

French Egyptologist

Marc Gabolde (born 30 May 1957 in Nantes) is a French Egyptologist, specialist of the Eighteenth Dynasty and the Amarna period.

After obtaining a Ph.D. in Egyptology at the University Lumière Lyon 2 in 1992, he joined Scientific IFAO (1993-1997). Since 1999 he has been a lecturer at the Université Paul Valéry - Montpellier III. He has conducted archaeological missions in the Valley of the Queens, Karnak, Balat, Tebtunis and Amarna. Gabolde is the author of D'Akhénaton à Toutânkhamon (2000).

== Publications ==
- Akhenaton : Du mystère à la lumière, coll. Découvertes Gallimard (nº 478), Paris, Gallimard, 2005, 128 pp. ISBN 207030745X
- Collab with Jean-Luc Bovot, Jean-Luc Chappaz and Rolf Krauss, Akhénaton et l'époque amarnienne, Paris, Khéops, 2005, 318 pp. ISBN 2950436862
- D'Akhénaton à Toutânkhamon, Paris, Inst. Arch. Hist. Antiquité, 2000, 310 pp. ISBN 2911971027
- Toutankhamon, Éditions Pygmalion 2025 (in French). ISBN978-2-7564-1789.9.
