= James Peter Allen =

American Egyptologist (born 1945)

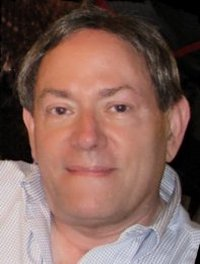
- Allen in 2015
- Born: 22 April 1945 (age 81)
- Education: Saint Meinrad Seminary and School of Theology (BA) 1968, University of Chicago (PhD) 1981
- Occupations: Egyptologist and Professor at Brown University
- Website: vivo.brown.edu/display/jpallen

James Peter Allen (born April 22, 1945) is an American Egyptologist, specializing in language and religion. He was curator of Egyptian Art at the Metropolitan Museum of Art from 1990 to 2006. In 2007, he became the Charles Edwin Wilbour Professor of Egyptology at Brown University. In 2008, he was elected president of the International Association of Egyptologists. He received his PhD from the University of Chicago of Near Eastern Languages and Civilizations.

== Early life and education ==
The oldest of three siblings, Allen was born according to his wife Susan, "into the U.S. Army" ... as his father proposed to his mother on an Army requisition form when his father was stationed in Burma. Both parents were in the U.S. Army and Allen was two weeks old when World War 2 ended in Europe. The family moved to Frankfurt, Germany where Allen learned to speak fluent German. In 1953, the family moved to San Antonio, Texas. When the family moved to Baltimore, Allen "bought a copy of Mercer’s An Egyptian Grammar and began learning Middle Egyptian from it."

He attended Saint Meinrad Seminary and School of Theology in Indiana, graduating in 1968 and his thesis “Genesis in Egypt: the Philosophy of Ancient Egyptian Creation Accounts" would later be published in 1988 as Genesis in Egypt. After receiving a scholarship, Allen moved to the University of Chicago of Near Eastern Languages and Civilizations where he was influenced by the writings of linguist Hans Polotsky and began learning Gardiner's sign list and Akkadian. Allen met his future wife, Susan at the University as she was studying Near Eastern archaeology. They were married in 1970.

It is my hope that this final edition of this grammar can serve not only as an introduction to the language of Egypt’s 4000 years of ancient history but also as the basis for a new effort to understand the language for what it really was and to let the ancient Egyptians speak in their own voice instead of the one we have so far given them … This book is, in part, an effort to embark on the third century of Egyptology with an open mind, and to set forth not as missionaries bringing the presumed benefits of Western ideology to a benighted past but as explorers seeking to understand the past on its own terms.

— James Peter Allen from Coptic: A Grammar of Its Six Major Dialects - 2020

== Career ==
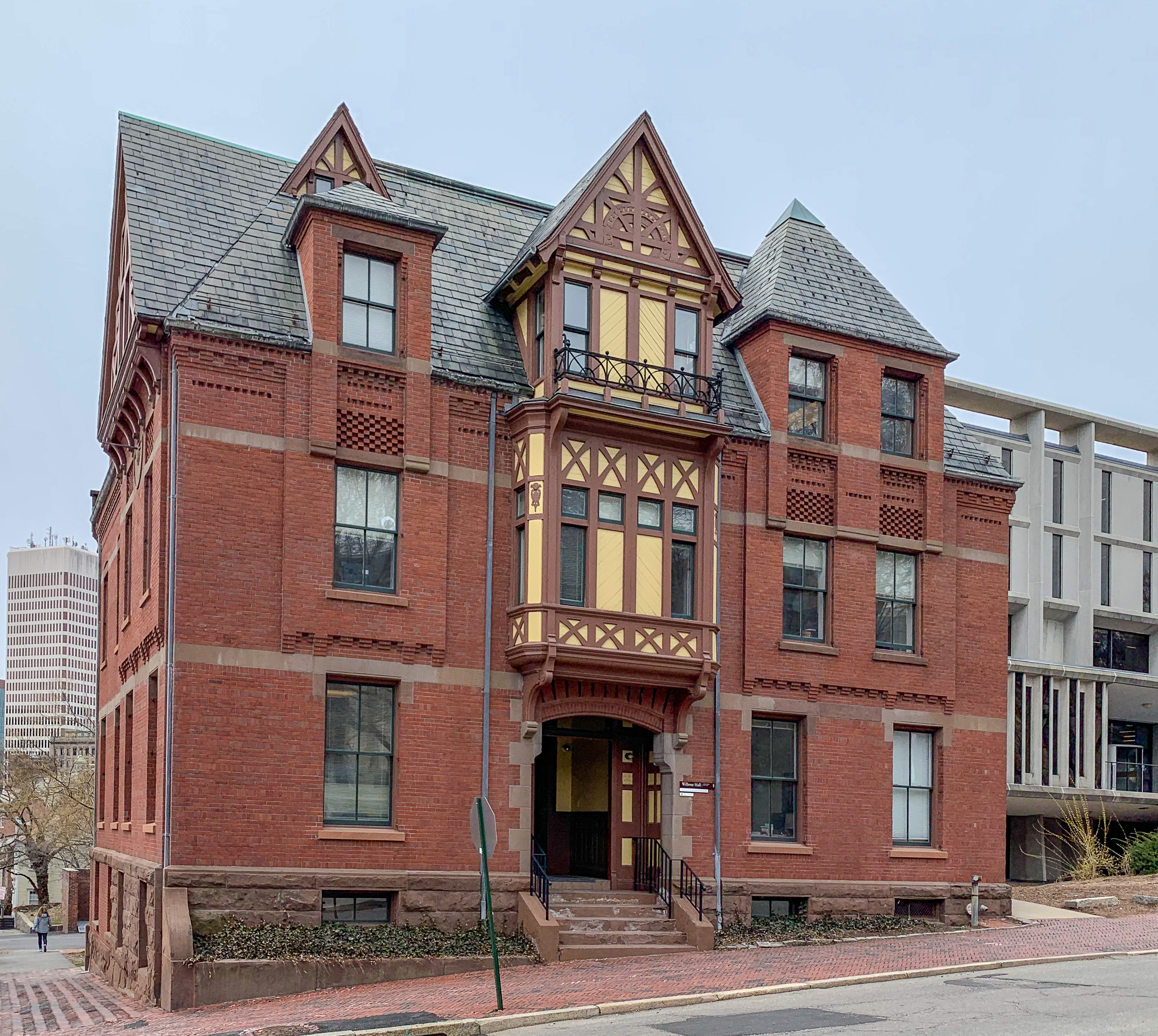
The Department of Egyptology and Assyriology in Wilbour Hall (1888). Wilbour Hall is named for Egyptologist Charles Edwin Wilbour (class of 1854)

In 1973, the couple began living part-time in Luxor, Egypt, where Allen "worked for the Epigraphic Survey first at the temple of Khonsu in Karnak, then the Seti Wall on the north side of the Hypostyle Hall and finally the Opet Colonnade in the Luxor Temple." They spent time living in Zamalek, Giza and finally moved to Newport, Rhode Island where he began to teach at Yale University. In 2006 Brown University offered Allen "the Charles Edwin Wilbour Professorshp of Egyptology". It was part of his responsibility to expand their Department of Egyptology into "a full department of Egyptology and Assyriology."

Allen was the "curator of Egyptian art and specialist in the culture's language and religion at the Metropolitan Museum of Art" in 1999. In 2005 his "new translation of the papyrus appears in the (Met's) exhibition catalog" In 2012 he was working a history of the Egyptian language with the great help of the Demotic dictionary saying 'What the Chicago Demotic Dictionary does is what the Oxford English Dictionary does'"

He is a former President of the International Association of Egyptologists (IAE)

== Publications ==
- The Inflection of the Verb in the Pyramid Texts (Malibu: Undena, 1984)
- Genesis in Egypt: The Philosophy of Ancient Egyptian Creation Accounts (New Haven: Yale University Press, 1988)
- Form, Function, and Meaning in the Early Egyptian Verb, LingAeg 1 (1991): pp.1-32
- Reading a Pyramid, in Hommages à Jean Leclant, Vol. 1: Études pharaoniques," (Cairo: IFAO, 1994): pp.5-28
- ""Allen, James P. et al, Egyptian Art in the Age of the Pyramids (New York: Metropolitan Museum of Art, 1999)
- Middle Egyptian: An Introduction to the Language and Culture of Hieroglyphs (Cambridge: University Press, 2000)
- The Heqanakht papyri PDF. (Metropolitan Museum of Art, New York, 2002)
- Some aspects of the non-royal afterlife in the Old Kingdom, in The Old Kingdom Art and Archaeology (Proceedings of the Conference held in Prague, May 31 - June 4, 2004, pp.9-17)
- The Art of Medicine in Ancient Egypt (New York: Metropolitan Museum of Art, 2006) Free Download PDF Link
- The Ancient Egyptian Pyramid Texts (Society of Biblical Literature, 2005) PDF
- The Egyptian Coffin Texts, Vol. 8. Middle Kingdom Copies of Pyramid Texts (Chicago: University Press, 2006)
- The Amarna Succession in Causing His Name to Live: Studies in Egyptian Epigraphy and History in Memory of William J. Murnane, University of Memphis, 2007
- The Amarna Succession Revised, GM 249 (2016), pp.9-13
- Middle Egyptian: An Introduction to the Language and Culture of Hieroglyphs 3rd ed. (Cambridge: University Press, 2014)
- The Debate between a Man and His Soul, a Masterpiece of Ancient Egyptian Literature (Culture and History of the Ancient Near East 44; Leiden and Boston: Brill, 2011)
- The Ancient Egyptian Language: An Historical Study (Cambridge University Press, 2013)
- Middle Egyptian Literature: Eight Literary Works (Cambridge University Press, 2015)
- A Grammar of the Ancient Egyptian Pyramid Texts, Vol. I: Unis (Eisenbrauns, 2017)
- Ancient Egyptian Phonology (Cambridge University Press, 2020)
- Coptic: A Grammar of Its Six Major Dialects (Eisenbrauns, 2020)
- "Ancient Egyptian Thought" (to be published by the American University in Cairo Press).
