= Aphalangy-syndactyly-microcephaly syndrome =

- Specialty: Medical genetics
- Prevention: none
- Prognosis: Medium
- Frequency: very rare, only 6 cases have been reported in medical literature.
- Deaths: -

Aphalangy-syndactyly-microcephaly syndrome is a very rare limb malformation syndrome which is characterized by agenesis of the distal phalanges (distal aphalangia), syndactyly, duplication of the fourth metatarsal, microcephaly, and mild intellectual disabilities. Only 6 cases from 4 families in Spain, Turkey and other countries have been reported in medical literature. Transmission is autosomal dominant.
