= Tutankhamun =

Pharaoh of Egypt from 1333 to 1324 BC

- Tutankhaten, Tutankhamen, Tutankhamon
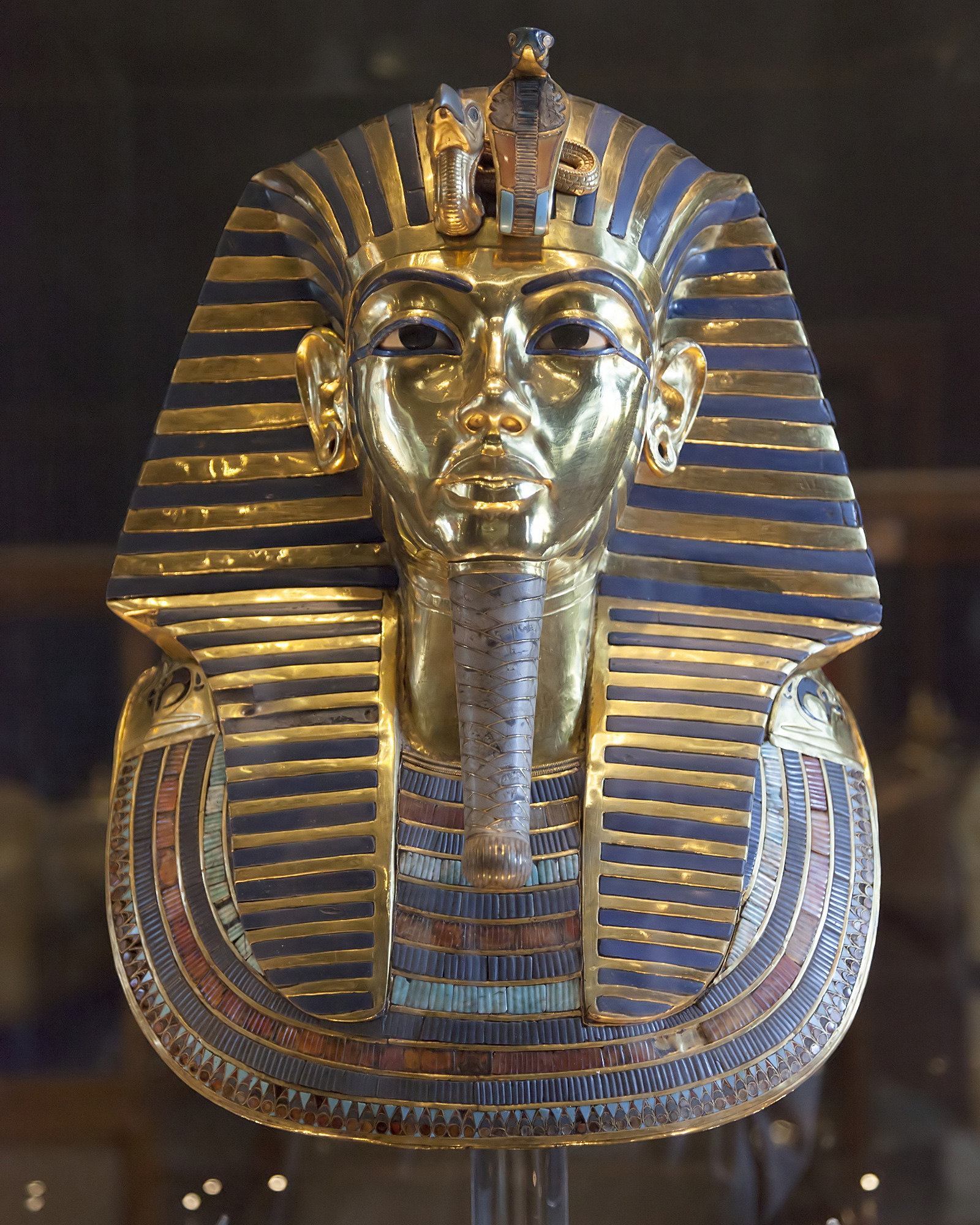
- Tutankhamun's golden funerary mask at the Grand Egyptian Museum in Giza, Egypt

Pharaoh
- Reign: c. 1332 – 1323 BC, New Kingdom
- Predecessor: Neferneferuaten (most likely) or Smenkhkare
- Successor: Ay
Royal titulary
Horus name
Ka nakht tut mesut
Victorious bull, the (very) image of (re)birth.
G5	E1 D40 t w t ms O34 t w Z3
Nebty name
Nefer hepu, segereh tawy
Perfect of laws, who has quieted down the Two Lands.
G16	nfr h p Z2 w s g r H a N17 N17
Golden Horus
Wetjes khau, sehetep netjeru
Elevated of appearances, who has satisfied the gods.
G8	U39 xa Y1 Z2 S29 Htp t p nTrw
Prenomen
Neb-kheperu-re
The possessor of the manifestation of Re.

M23 X1 L2 X1	ra xpr Z2 nb
Nomen
Tut-ankh-imen, heqa iunu-shemau
The living image of Amun, ruler of the Heliopolis of Upper Egypt.

G39 N5	i mn n t w t anx S38 O28 M26
- Consort: Ankhesenamun
- Children: 2
- Father: Akhenaten or Smenkhkare
- Mother: The Younger Lady
- Born: c. 1342 BC
- Died: c. 1323 BC (aged around 18)
- Burial: KV62
- Religion: Ancient Egyptian religion
- Dynasty: 18th Dynasty

Tutankhamun (Note: /ˌtuːtənkɑːˈmuːn/ TOO-tən-kah-MOON) or Tutankhamen (Note: /ˌtuːtənˈkɑːmən, -mɛn/ TOO-tən-KAH-mən, -men) (Ancient Egyptian: twt-ꜥnḫ-jmn; c. 1342 BC – c. 1323 BC), was the third to last pharaoh of the Eighteenth Dynasty of ancient Egypt, who ruled c. 1332 – 1323 BC, dying at about the age of 19. Born Tutankhaten, his administration restored the traditional polytheistic form of ancient Egyptian religion, undoing a previous shift to the religion known as Atenism. Tutankhamun's tomb door proclaims his devotion to the ancient Egyptian gods.

His endowments and restorations of cults were recorded on the Restoration Stela. The cult of the god Amun at Thebes was restored to prominence, and the royal couple changed their names to "Tutankhamun" and "Ankhesenamun", replacing the -aten suffix. He also moved the royal court from Akhenaten's capital, Amarna, back to Memphis almost immediately on his accession to the kingship. He reestablished diplomatic relations with the Mitanni and carried out military campaigns in Nubia and the Near East. Tutankhamun was one of only a few kings known to be worshipped as a deity during their lifetime. He likely began construction of a royal tomb in the Valley of the Kings and an accompanying mortuary temple, but both were unfinished at the time of his death.

In 2012, it was suggested he died from a combination of malaria and a leg fracture. Since his royal tomb was incomplete, he was instead buried in a small non-royal tomb adapted for the purpose. He was succeeded by Ay, who had held titles such as Fan-bearer on the Right Side of the King. After a very brief reign, Ay was succeeded by Horemheb, who had been the commander-in-chief of Tutankhamun's armed forces. Under Horemheb, the restoration of the traditional ancient Egyptian religion was completed; Ay and Tutankhamun's constructions were usurped, and earlier Amarna Period rulers were erased.

Tutankhamun's tomb was discovered in 1922 by excavators led by Howard Carter and his patron, George Herbert, 5th Earl of Carnarvon. Although it had clearly been raided and robbed in ancient times, it retained much of its original contents, including the king's undisturbed mummy. The discovery received worldwide press coverage; with over 5,000 artifacts, it gave rise to renewed public interest in ancient Egypt, for which Tutankhamun's mask, preserved at the Egyptian Museum, remains a popular symbol. Before it was relocated to the Grand Egyptian Museum in 2025, some of his treasures have traveled worldwide, with unprecedented response; the Egyptian government allowed tours of the tomb beginning in 1961. The deaths of some individuals who were involved in the excavation have been popularly attributed to the "curse of the pharaohs" due to the similarity of their circumstances. Since the discovery of his tomb, he has been referred to colloquially as "King Tut".

== Family ==
=== Parentage ===
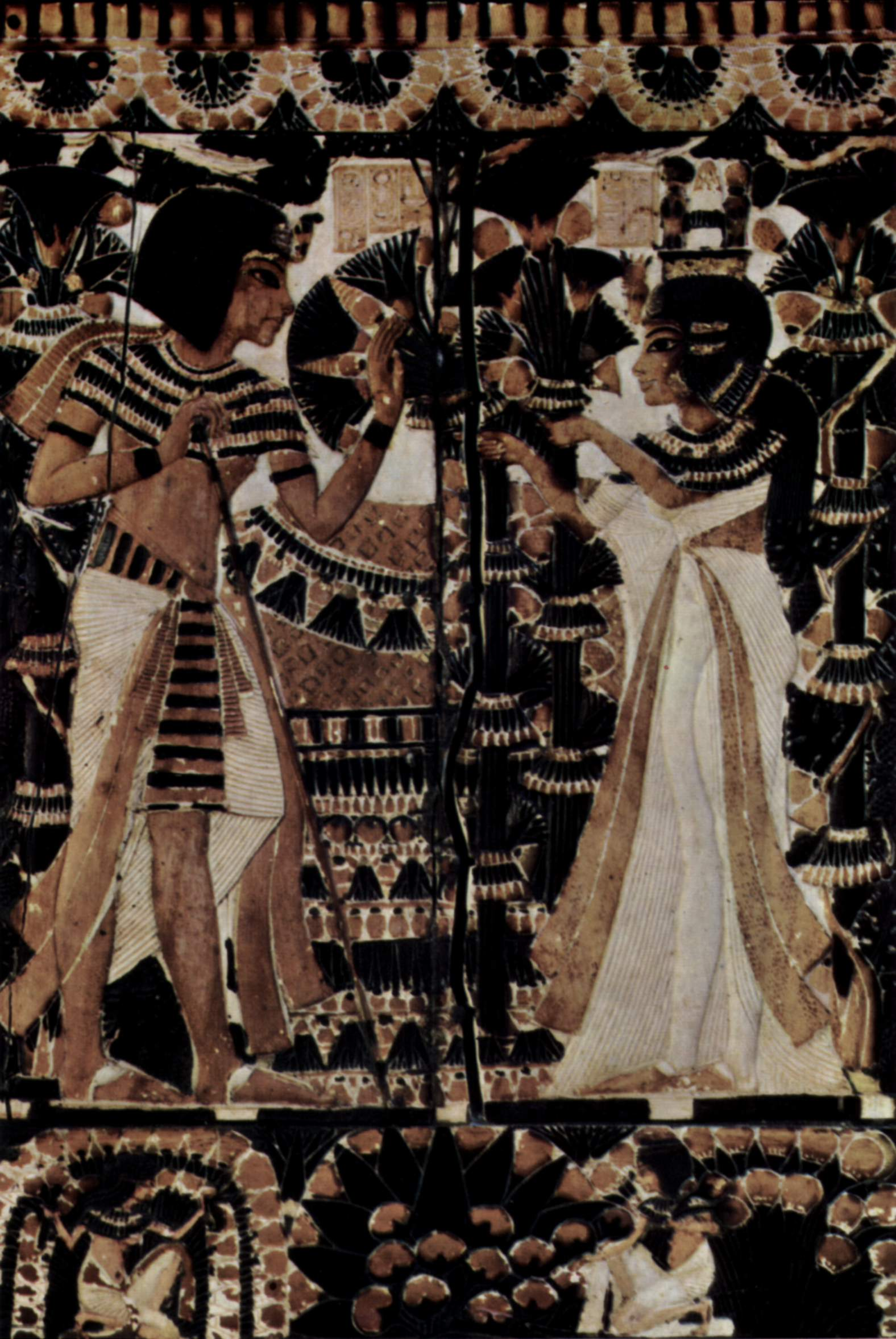
Tutankhamun and Ankhesenamun with two anonymous children (below), who are either their offspring or the representation of the King and the Queen themselves.

Tutankhamun was born in the reign of Akhenaten, during the Amarna Period of the late Eighteenth Dynasty of Egypt. His original name was Tutankhaten or Tutankhuaten, meaning "living image of Aten", (Note: Tutankhaten was believed to mean "Living-image-of-Aten" as far back as 1877; however, not all Egyptologists agree with this interpretation. English Egyptologist Battiscombe Gunn believed that the older interpretation did not fit with Akhenaten's theology. Gunn believed that such a name would have been blasphemous. He saw tut as a verb and not a noun and gave his translation in 1926 as The-life-of-Aten-is-pleasing. Professor Gerhard Fecht also believed the word tut was a verb. He noted that Akhenaten used tit as a word for 'image', not tut. Fecht translated the verb tut as "To be perfect/complete". Using Aten as the subject, Fecht's full translation was "One-perfect-of-life-is-Aten". The Hermopolis Block (two carved block fragments discovered in Ashmunein) has a unique spelling of the first nomen written as Tutankhuaten; it uses ankh as a verb, which does support the older translation of Living-image-of-Aten.) reflecting the shift in ancient Egyptian religion known as Atenism which characterized Akhenaten's reign.

His parentage is debated as it is not attested in surviving inscriptions. He was certainly a prince, as a fragmentary inscription from Hermopolis refers to "Tutankhuaten" as a "king's son". He is generally thought to have been the son of Akhenaten or his co-ruler/successor Smenkhkare. Inscriptions from Tutankhamun's reign treat him as a son of Akhenaten's father, Amenhotep III, but that is only possible if Akhenaten's 17-year reign included a long co-regency with his father, a possibility that many Egyptologists once supported but is now being abandoned. His mother has been variously suggested to be Akhenaten's chief wife Nefertiti, Amenhotep III's daughter Beketaten, or Akhenaten's daughters Meritaten (Note: His parents are suggested to be Meritaten and her known husband Smenkhkare based on a re-examination of a box lid and coronation tunic found in his tomb.) or Meketaten. (Note: Meketaten's candidacy is based on a relief from the Royal Tomb at Amarna which depicts a child in the arms of a nurse outside a chamber in which Meketaten is being mourned by her parents and siblings, which has been interpreted to indicate she died in childbirth. This possibility has been deemed unlikely given that she was about 10 years old at the time of her death.) Tutankhamun was wet nursed by a woman named Maia, known from her tomb at Saqqara.

DNA testing identified his father as the mummified man from tomb KV55, thought to be either Akhenaten or Smenkhkare. "The Younger Lady", an anonymous mummy cached in tomb KV35, was identified as Tutankhamun's mother. According to genetic research, his parents appear to be full siblings, both being children of Amenhotep III and his chief wife, Tiye. (Note: The team reported it was over 99.99 percent certain that Amenhotep III was the father of the individual in KV55, who was in turn the father of Tutankhamun. More recent genetic analysis, published in 2020, revealed Tutankhamun shared his Y-haplogroup with his father, the KV55 mummy (Akhenaten), and grandfather, Amenhotep III, and his mtDNA haplogroup with his mother, The Younger Lady, his grandmother, Tiye, and his great-grandmother, Thuya, upholding the results of the earlier genetic study.)

The exact identity of The Younger Lady is unknown. Nefertiti is not known to be a sister of Akhenaten, which seemingly excludes her. However, researchers such as Marc Gabolde and Aidan Dodson claim that it remains a possibility, with the alternative reading of genetic results that proposes Tutankhamun was a result not of a brother/sister pairing but instead of three generations of first-cousin marriage; the theory works under assumption that Nefertiti and Akhenaten were related to each other.

Kara Cooney considers unlikely both Nefertiti being Tutankhamun's mother and the Younger Lady being Akhenaten's sister; she instead proposes that Akhenaten fathered his son by one of his daughters, Meritaten or Meketaten, "making him [Tutankhamun] a product of father-daughter incest and thus fitting the [inbreeding] DNA evidence of his body". Juan Belmonte acknowledges the genetic possibility of Akhenaten's daughter being the Younger Lady, although he notes it would be very improbable. Assuming the accuracy of the results, the Younger Lady is most likely one of Amenhotep III and Tiye's younger daughters, perhaps Nebetah or Beketaten.

The validity and reliability of the genetic data from mummified remains have been questioned due to possible degradation due to decay, as well as ambiguous readings of the results due to potential inbreeding in the family. Joyce Tyldesley ignores the genetic results altogether and considers KV55 male and the Younger Lady more likely to be Smenkhkare and Meritaten as Tutankhamun's half-siblings, with Tutankhamun being a son of Akhenaten by Kiya in her reconstruction.

Juan Belmonte argues that female succession after Akhenaten seems to suggest that Tutankhamun was not viewed heir apparent to the throne. Based on that, Belmonte speculates Tutankhamun was neither Akhenaten's son nor grandson, but instead Akhenaten's nephew as child of Smenkhkare by his sister-consort, who never became the Great Royal Wife herself. Belmonte proposes that Tutankhamun's parents were Smenkhkare and Beketaten.

=== Consorts and children ===
When Tutankhaten became king, he married Ankhesenpaaten, one of Akhenaten's daughters, who later changed her name to Ankhesenamun. He fathered two daughters who died at or soon after birth and were buried with him in his tomb. Computed tomography studies published in 2011 revealed that one daughter was born prematurely at 5–6 months of pregnancy and the other at full-term, 9 months. DNA testing has suggested the anonymous mummy KV21A is their mother, but the data is not statistically significant enough to allow her to be securely identified as his only known wife, Ankhesenamun.

Regardless of KV21a's maternity, genetic research suggests that male mummy KV55, who is suggested to be Ankhesenamun's father, Akhenaten, cannot be the two girls' maternal grandfather. Assuming the accuracy of the obtained data, this could mean that the mother of the two princesses was not Ankhesenamun but some unknown wife of Tutankhamun, although there also remains the possibility that Akhenaten was not Ankhesenamun's biological father, or that the KV55 male is not Akhenaten but Smenkhkare.

Two other children, a boy and a girl, are depicted alongside Tutankhamun and Ankhesenamun on ivory box. They have been proposed to be either a symbolic representation of the royal couple or the pair's otherwise unknown offspring.

Tutankhamun's death marked the end of the royal bloodline of the Eighteenth Dynasty.

== Reign ==
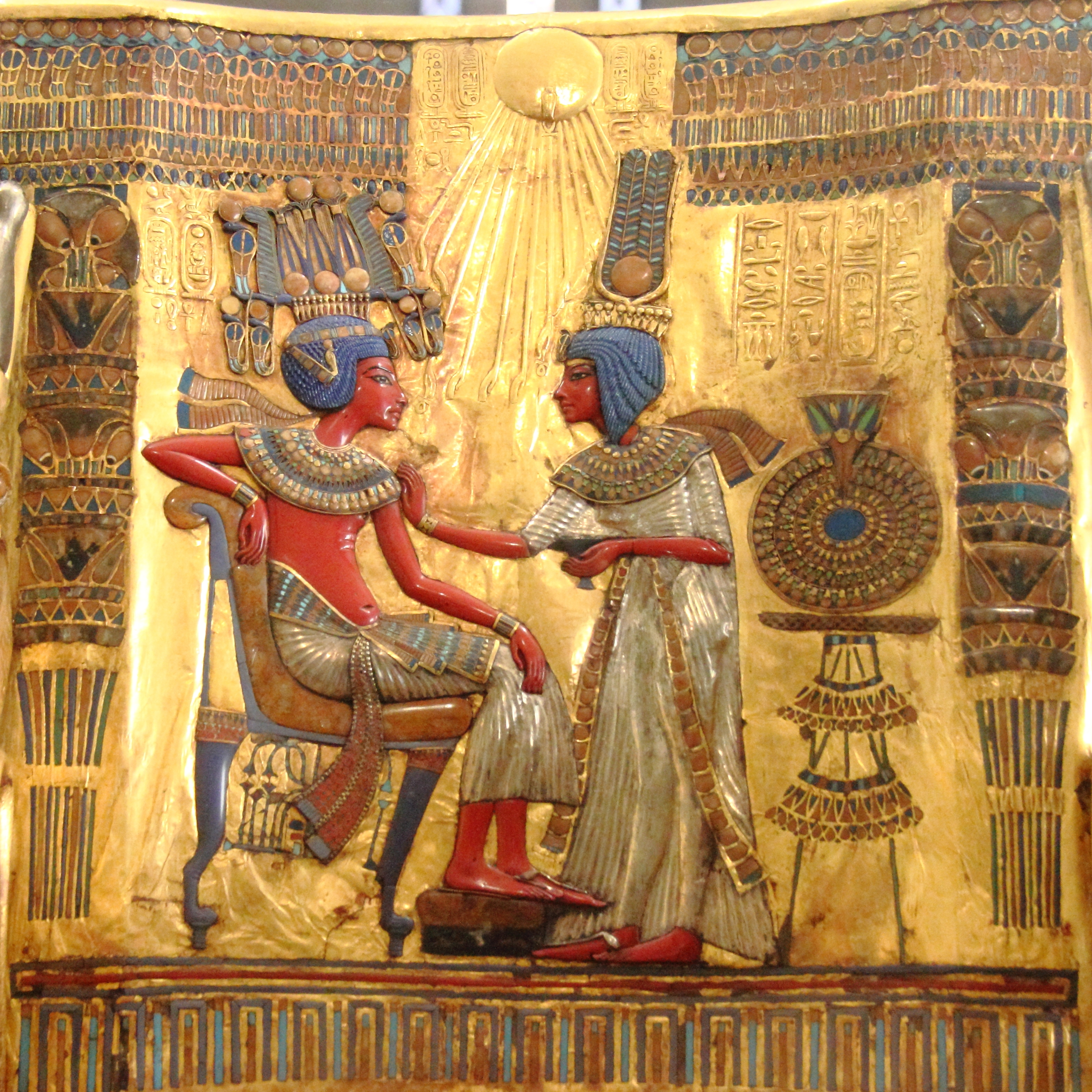
The throne of Tutankhamun, the Aten depicted above

Tutankhamun became pharaoh between 8 and 9 years of age following the short reigns of Akhenaten's successors, Smenkhkare and Neferneferuaten. It is uncertain whether Smenkhkare's reign outlasted Akhenaten's; the female ruler Neferneferuaten is now thought to have either been co-regent shortly before Akhenaten's death or to have had a sole reign of two or three years before the accession of Tutankhamun, which means that she was Tutankhamun's predecessor according to Athena van der Perre and Nozumu Kawai. On acceding to the throne, Tutankhamun took the throne name Nebkheperure. He reigned for about nine years.

During Tutankhamun's reign, the position of Vizier was split between Upper and Lower Egypt. The principal vizier for Upper Egypt was Usermontu. Another figure named Pentju was also vizier, but it is unclear which lands. It is not entirely known if Ay, Tutankhamun's successor, actually held this position. A gold foil fragment from KV58 seems to indicate, but not certainly, that Ay was referred to as a Priest of Maat along with an epithet of "vizier, doer of maat." The epithet does not fit the usual description used by the regular vizier but might indicate an informal title. It might be that Ay used the title of vizier in an unprecedented manner. Nevertheless, the interpretation of this document as referring to a vizier is debated, and the vizier title may not be sufficient to add to Ay's well-documented titles.

An Egyptian priest named Manetho wrote a comprehensive history of ancient Egypt where he refers to a king named Orus, who ruled for 36 years and had a daughter named Acencheres, who reigned for twelve years, and her brother Rathotis, who ruled for only nine years. The Amarna rulers are central in the list, but which name corresponds with which historic figure is not agreed upon by researchers. Orus and Acencheres have been identified with Horemheb and Akhenaten, and Rathotis with Tutankhamun. The names are also associated with Smenkhkare, Amenhotep III, Ay, and the others in differing order.

Cartouche left: Nomen "Tutankhamun, ruler of Upper Heliopolis". Right: Prenomen "Nebkheperura".

For the pharaoh, who held divine office, to be linked to the people and the gods, special epithets were created for them at their accession to the throne. The ancient Egyptian titulary also served to demonstrate one's qualities and link them to the terrestrial realm. The five names were developed over the centuries, beginning with the Horus name. (Note: Tutankhamun's Horus Name was Ka nakht tut mesut, translated as; Victorious bull, the (very) image of (re)birth.) Tutankhamun's (Note: His second full nomen (also called the Son of Re Name) was; Tut ankh imen, heqa iunu shemau, translated as; The living image of Amun, Ruler of Southern Heliopolis.) original nomen, Tutankhaten, did not have a Nebty name (Note: Tutankahmun's Nebty or Two Ladies Name was; (1): Nefer hepu, segereh tawy, translated as; Perfect of laws, who has quieted down the Two Lands. (2): Nefer hepu, segereh tawy sehetep netjeru nebu, translated as; Perfect of laws, who has quieted down the Two Lands and pacified all the gods. (3): Wer ah imen, translated as; The great one of the palace of Amun.) or a Gold Falcon name (Note: Tutankhamun's Gold Falcon Name was: (1): Wetjes khau, sehetep netjeru translated as; Elevated of appearances, who has satisfied the gods. *Gold Falcon name (2): Wetjes khau it ef ra, translates as; Who has elevated the appearances of his father Re.) associated with it as nothing has been found with the full five-name protocol. (Note: Tutankhamun's Prenomen (Throne Name) was: Neb kheperu re, translated as: The possessor of the manifestation of Re, which had an epithet added: Heqa maat, translated as; Ruler of Maat.)

=== Religiopolitical countermand ===
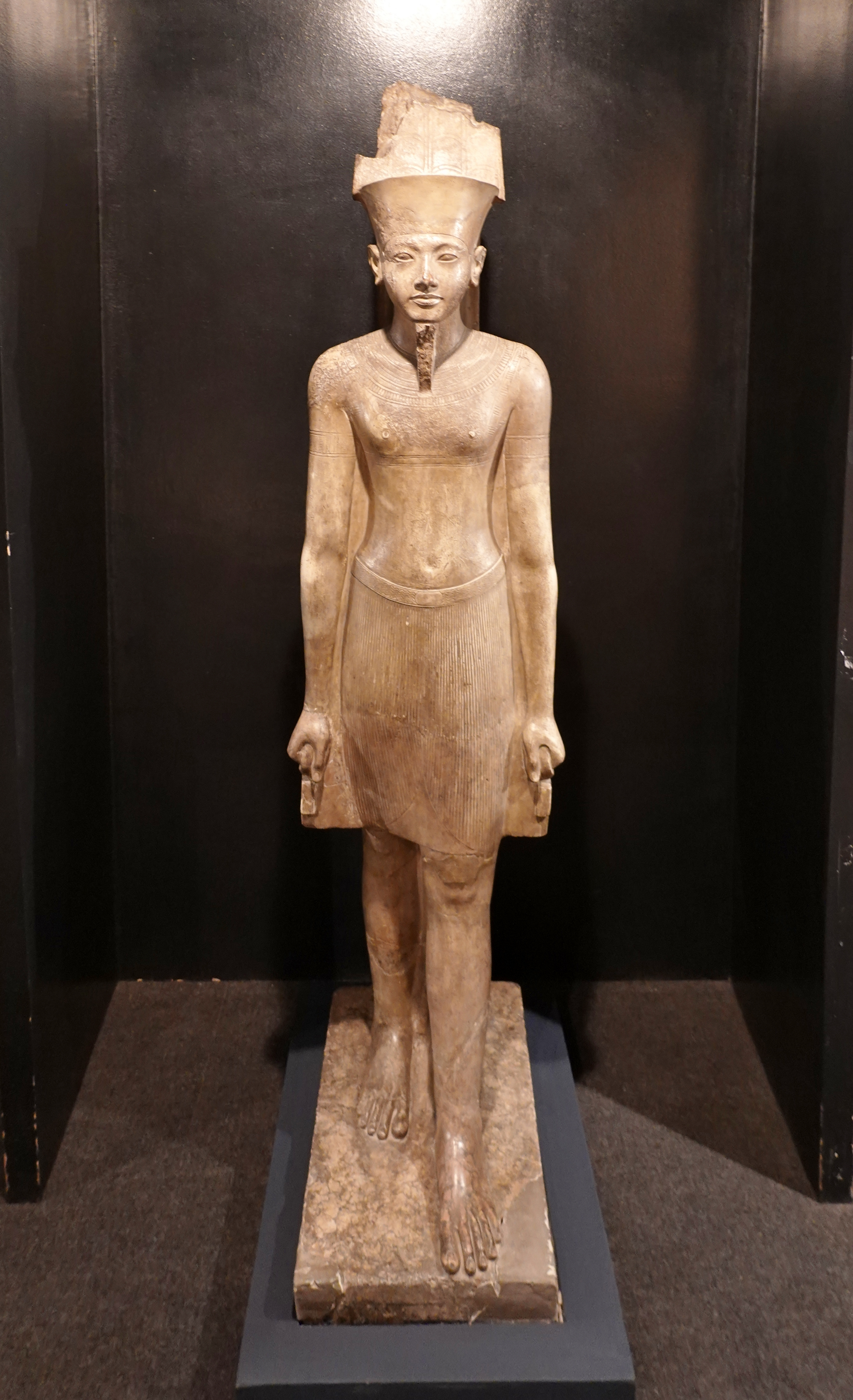
A statue of the god Amun, with the features of Tutankhamun.

At the beginning of Tutankhaten's reign, the royal court was still located at Amarna, and evidence from his tomb shows that the Aten was still acknowledged. But several pieces of evidence suggest that his court was trying to reconcile Atenism with the traditional religion, and activity at Amarna decreased during the first four years of his reign. These years saw dramatic reversals of Akhenaten's policies, which, given the king's young age, must have been instigated by his advisors.

In his third regnal year, Tutankhamun reversed several changes made during his father's reign. He ended the worship of the god Aten and restored the god Amun to supremacy. The ban on the cult of Amun was lifted and traditional privileges were restored to its priesthood. The king changed his name to "Tutankhamun", and that of his queen to "Ankhesenamun". Tutankhamun enriched and endowed the priestly orders of important cults, and initiated a restoration process for old monuments that were damaged during the Amarna Period, and recorded these actions on the Restoration Stela erected in his regnal year 4; the stele was later usurped by Horemheb. He reburied his father's remains in the Valley of the Kings. It has been argued that it was in fact Tutankhamun himself, and not his successors, who began reversing Akhenaten's religious changes on a large scale.

Around this time, the royal court abandoned Amarna. Memphis became the main seat of royal administration, continuing a trend that dated back to Akhenaten's predecessors, toward administering the country from that central location rather than the more outlying site of Thebes. The capital was moved back to Thebes and the city of Akhetaten was abandoned. With Amun restored as Egypt's preeminent deity, Thebes once again became its greatest center of religious activity.

Tutankhamun's treasurer, Maya, titled overseer of the treasuries, was instrumental in executing Tutankhamun's regal orders of the restoration program. In his autobiography, he described himself as "one who carried out the plans of the king of my time and one who did not neglect what he had commanded to make splendid the temples, in fashioning the images of the gods".

This countermand rendered Tutankhamun's reign one of the greatest restoration periods in ancient Egyptian history. The action established his legacy as such. Concurrently, Tutankhamun's tomb door describes him as he "who spent his life fashioning images of the gods".

==== Architectural projects ====
As part of the restoration of the traditional cults, the king initiated building projects, in particular at Karnak in Thebes, where he laid out the sphinx avenue leading to the temple of Mut. The sphinxes were originally made for Akhenaten and Nefertiti; they were given new ram heads and small statues of the king. At Luxor temple he completed the decoration of the entrance colonnade of Amenhotep III. Tutankhamun made several endowments that enriched and added to the priestly numbers of the cults of Amun and Ptah. He commissioned new statues of the deities from the best metals and stone and had new processional barques made of the finest cedar from Lebanon and had them embellished with gold and silver.

A building called the Temple-of-Nebkheperure-Beloved-of-Amun-Who-Puts-Thebes-in-Order, which may be identical to a building called Temple-of-Nebkheperre-in-Thebes, a possible mortuary temple, used recycled talatat from Akhenaten's east Karnak Aten temples, indicating that the dismantling of these temples was already underway. Many of Tutankhamun's construction projects were uncompleted at the time of his death and were completed by or usurped by his successors, especially Horemheb. The Sphinx Avenue was completed by his successor, Ay, and the whole was usurped by Horemheb. Pieces of the Temple of Nebkheperure in Thebes were recycled into Horemheb's own building projects.

=== Military campaigns ===
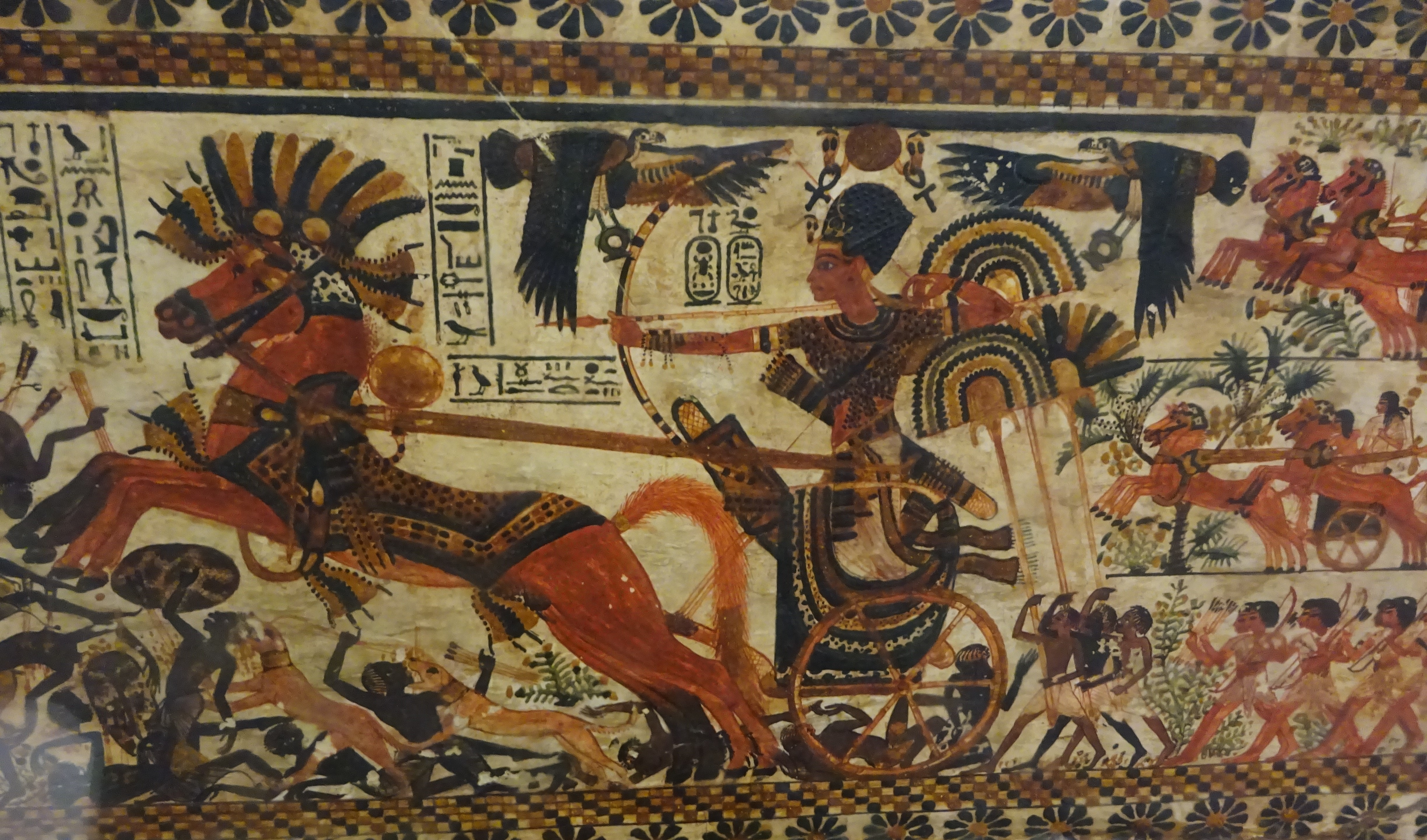
Tutankhamun charging enemies, 18th dynasty

The country is often characterized as having been economically weak and in turmoil following the reign of Akhenaten. Diplomatic relations with other kingdoms had been neglected, and Tutankhamun sought to restore them, in particular with the Mitanni. Evidence of his success is suggested by the gifts from various countries found in his tomb. Despite his efforts for improved relations, battles with Nubians and Asiatics were recorded in his mortuary temple at Thebes, both victories for Egypt. As far as is known, Tutankhamun's military reign was undefeated, and is one of several other undefeated reigns in ancient Egypt's history.

==== Battle participation ====
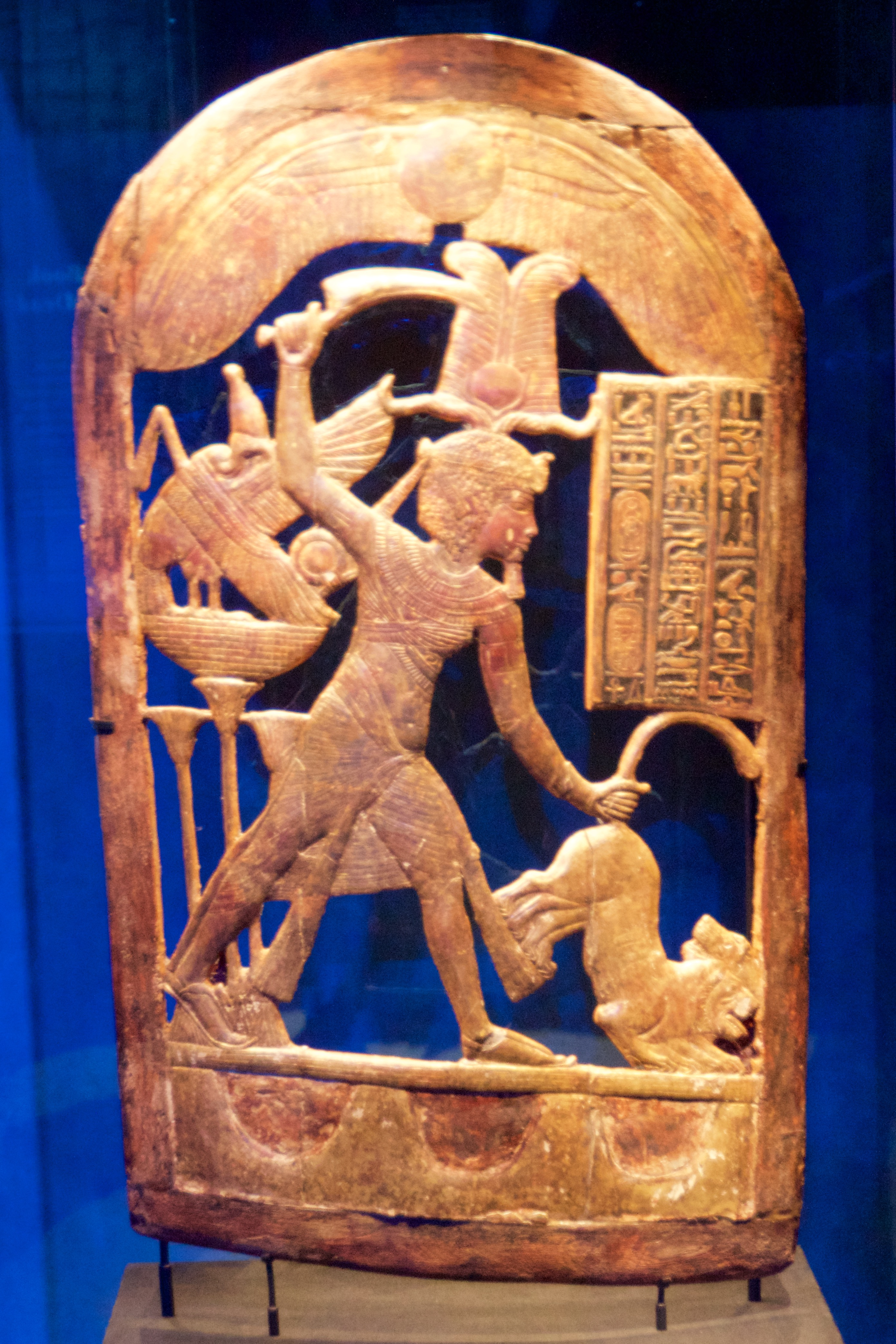
One of Tutankhamun's shields, depicting him threatening lions, symbolizing Egypt's enemies

The extent to which Tutankhamun participated in battles is an open question and has yet to reach consensus among researchers. On one hand, his tomb contained extensive military armament, such as bows, khopesh swords, daggers, wristguards, maces, shields, and a club, indicating he had extensive weaponry training. Many such items were inscribed with his name, and clearly in used condition. High quality archery weaponry and archery equipment was in abundance in his tomb. For example, there were over 400 arrows and over 40 bows.

Various imagery, in ancient Egypt's classic battle narrative art genre, does depict Tutankhamun as directly participatory in warfare, such as the graphic battle depictions on the painted treasure chest in his tomb, and a gold leaf picture of him during chariot archery against enemies. Additional figurative military art depicts him dominating enemies, such as imagery of him as a sphinx trampling foes. Other personalized artifacts, such as the Nine Bows footstool, walking sticks, and sandals depicting enemies, suggest that he was personally involved in Egypt's international conflict. One of the composite bows in Tutankhamun's tomb have tips carved and painted to resemble bounded enemies position so that the bowstring is tied around the neck. Thus, whenever the bow was drawn, the enemy depiction was strangled. This also indicates personalized investment in military conflict. Egyptologist Bob Brier has argued leaning towards Tutankhamun being an actively participating warrior in his later years.

On the other hand, given Tutankhamun's youth and hypothesized physical disabilities, like a speculated cane handicap, some historians are skeptical that he participated in these battles. However, there are strong objections to both concerns. For example experts such as Biomedical Egyptologist Sofia Aziz and other researchers, have taken the position that the speculations of Tutankhamun's physical frailty are overestimated, arguing that mummy damage has led to misdiagnosis. For example, Tutankhamun's mummy endured being sawed in half at the torso, decapitation, torso dismemberment, skull impalement, and dismemberment of all four limbs including at elbows, wrists, knees and ankles. Instead, the researchers argue that the more rigorous, scientific view is that he was physically active and perhaps militarily participatory. Egyptologist Salima Ikram has also argued against the physical disability view, arguing for Tutankhamun's active battle participation, noting that mummy damage could be the source of the suspected physical disabilities, particularly the suspected podiatric illness especially because it does not match walking cane wear. Furthermore, the leather armor suit and other weaponry discovered in Tutankhamun's tomb also indicate active battle participation.

Tutankhamun's youth is also consistent with him being militarily participatory given that boy soldiering was standard in Ancient Egypt. Imagery from the reign of Horemheb depict him accompanied by young naked boys serving as errand-boys in the military. Other scribal texts such as the Miscellanies detail how young boys were enlisted in the military at very early ages. The text Teaching for King Merykara describes similar recruitment protocol. Another text, Papyrus Sallier I, states that

"The child will be at the service of the soldier whereas the teenager will be an infantryman."

Egyptologist Amandine Marshall stated of boy soldiers that "once they reached the end of their childhood, as teenagers they would have been fully integrated into the Egyptian army, becoming soldiers trained to kill to defend their king and country". Hence, overall, given that boy soldiers were widespread and normalized in this time period, Tutankhamun's youth is unproblematic for the plausibility of his active battle participation.

=== During-life deification ===
In ancient Egypt, pharaohs were venerated after their deaths through mortuary cults and associated temples as deities. This form of apotheosis was typically reserved for deceased pharaohs, but Tutankhamun was one of the few pharaohs who was worshiped in this manner during his lifetime. This is known from several different points of evidence, such as temples in Nubia and distinct Karnak stela that all indicated worship of Tutankhamun as a deity during his lifetime.

==== Nubian temples ====
At least two temples of Tutankhamun's cult were built in Nubia. One temple was built in Kawa, Nubia that was dedicated to the god Amun, and the god Amun in its local form incarnation, which was literally identical to Tutankhamun.

Another smaller temple was built in Faras, Nubia in a town referred to as 'He who appeases the gods'. It was discovered by British Egyptologist Francis Llewellyn Griffith during excavations in around 1912, roughly 10 years before the discovery of Tutankhamun's tomb. The temple was called, “Pacifying the gods”, which is the same as Tutankhamun's Golden Horus name. This temple was dedicated to the gods of the traditional indigenous ancient Egyptian religion, as opposed to the Aten. Namely, the gods associated were Amun, Amun-Ra, Re-Horakhty and the deified form of Tutankhamun himself as a local incarnation of Amun. In addition to the temple's theological purposes, it also functioned as a headquarters of Egypt's Nubian administration.

Temple of Tutankhamun's during-lifetime deified form at Faras, Nubia (1912)

The Kawa temple was initially discovered by Colonel Colborne in 1885. However, Tutankhamun's was not yet systematically excavated then. Later, in 1929, Egyptologist Francis Llewellyn Griffith first initiated systematic excavations at Kawa, uncovering Tutankhamun's temple. Archaeologist Derek A. Welsby described the physical constitution of the temple:

This temple, 38 x 17m in size, was built of mud brick lined with stone in the door passages on the main axis and in the pronaos (anteroom) and sanctuary chamber. it was aligned north-south, parallel to the Nile. Entered from the north the first court had colonnades to each side with six stone columns. The second court with four columns gave access via the pronaos into the sanctuary roofed with stone slabs, still remaining in place into the 1930s, and flanked by rooms to each side.

The temple contained columns bearing Tutankhamun's nomen that characterize Tutankhamun with the titles Beloved of Amun-Re, Lord of the Thrones of the Two Lands and Lion over the South Country. The last title is exemplary of the lionization theme recurrent in the theology of the cult of the during-lifetime deified form of Tutankhamun. Egyptologist Lanny Bell described the meaning of a criosphinx imagery at the Kawa Temple as a representation of the deified form of Tutankhamun as Amun-Re:

In the context of the extensive evidence available on the assimilation of the king to Amun-Re, especially in Nubia, Tutankhamun's adoration of himself as a form of this god at Kawa is hardly as outlandish as might at first have seemed. In this he was following the precedent of Amenhotep III; Ramesses II merely displayed the symbolism of his predecessors on an unparalleled scale.

Temple of Tutankhamun's during-lifetime deified form at Kawa, Nubia (1930)

Tutankhamun patterned his cult parallel to Amenhotep III, except emphasizing Amun instead of Aten. Then, Ramesses II would amplify this cult framework and theology in the design of his own cult. Notably, the use of Tutankhamun's Kawa temple continued for at least about two centuries, as indicated by later inscriptions added to its walls evidencing that the temple was active until at least the reign of the pharaoh Ramesses VI, dated approximately to 1143-1136 BC. At some point, its use declined and it was no longer maintained. Later on, in the year 701 BC, Twenty-fifth Dynasty pharaoh Taharqa ordered rebuilding construction on the temple after he noticed its poor physical condition during a military campaign. Taharqa was en route to seize command of Kush armies that were pooled on northeastern frontier of Kush, near what is today known as Gaza. An ancient text from the reign of Taharqa reads:

He found that this temple had been built in brick, but that its sandhill had reached to its roof; it having been covered over with earth at a time of the year when one feared the occurrence of rainfall.

At this time, representations of King Taharqo were carved onto the door jambs of Tutankhamun's Kawa temple.

==== Stela of Huy ====
The Stela of Huy discovered at Karnak Temple is also evidence of the lifetime deification of pharaoh Tutankhamun, indicating that Tutankhamun's cult was flourishing in the Theban region, as well. It contains a hymn directed to the deified form of Tutankhamun as the local Amun. Below is an excerpt of an English translation:

Give praises the ka of Amun,
lord of Karnak homage to Amun,
by whom swear the Two Lands
and ... to the royal ka of Tutankhamun

The hymn clearly regards Tutankhamun with equivalent divinity as the god Amun. Lanny Bell also described artwork accompanying the Stela of Huy, stating that Huy is shown standing adoring three deities: Amun-Re the lord of the Thrones of the Two Lands, a ram-headed Amun, and the royal ka of Tutankhamun. Hence, the artwork of the stela also clearly juxtaposes Tutankhamun with deities.

==== Nubian desert monuments ====
Archaeological evidence suggests an ancient Egyptian stronghold and military dominance over ancient ancient Nubia during the reign of Tutankhamun. Various artifacts discovered in the deserts adjacent to the Nubian Nile Valley commemorate Tutankhamun's successes in the region. Egyptologists Colleen Manassa and John Darnell write of Tutankhamun's military robustness in Nubia:

A very few, but far-ranging, and even unique monuments of his reign suggest that the adorations of the deified Tutankhamun was well deserved, since he showed particular vigor in the deserts east and west of the Nubian Nile Valley.

The multitude of monuments are of a multifaceted assortment, while a particular portion of the monuments are of design unique to Tutankhamun's reign.

==== Cult structure ====
Tutankhamun's cult of his deified form had its own hierarchical structure that resembled the structure of a typical pharaoh mortuary cult. Information obtained from tomb TT40, the tomb of Huy provides information about these positions. An official named Khay carried the title First Prophet of Nebkheperura, a position responsible for overseeing the posthumous cult of Tutankhamun, whose throne name was Nebkheperura. Another official, named Mermose, was the Second Prophet of Nebkheperura. Merymose is the brother of Huy. Three positions in the cult and their respective appointees are known, summarized in the table below:

Tutankhamun Cult Structure
Appointee	Position
Khay	1st Prophet of Tutankhamun
Mermose	2nd Prophet of Tutankhamun
Taemwadjsy	Chief of the Harem of the Deified Tutankhamun

Khay was appointed by Tutankhamun as the officiator of the cult. Mermose, the second in the hierarchal structure, was the brother of Viceroy Huy. The harem that Taemwadjsy managed was located at Kawa, Nubia, and was specifically dedicated to Tutankhamun's deified form. It was a distinct harem from his other mortal cult, the Harem of Amun-Re.

This clergy structure of the cult of the deified form of Tutankhamun followed a similar clergy structure to the ordinary cult of Amun. In the ordinary Amun priesthood, the High Priest of Amun, also known as the First Prophet of Amun, was the leading authority, while the Second Prophet of Amun was a subordinate position. This is analogous to the how Khay was the First Prophet of Tutankhamun, and Mermose was the Second Prophet of Tutankhamun. Similarly, Taemwadjsy's position of Chief of the Harem of the Deified Tutankhamun is akin to the position of the Chief of the Harem of Amun-Re.

== Personal life ==
=== Health ===
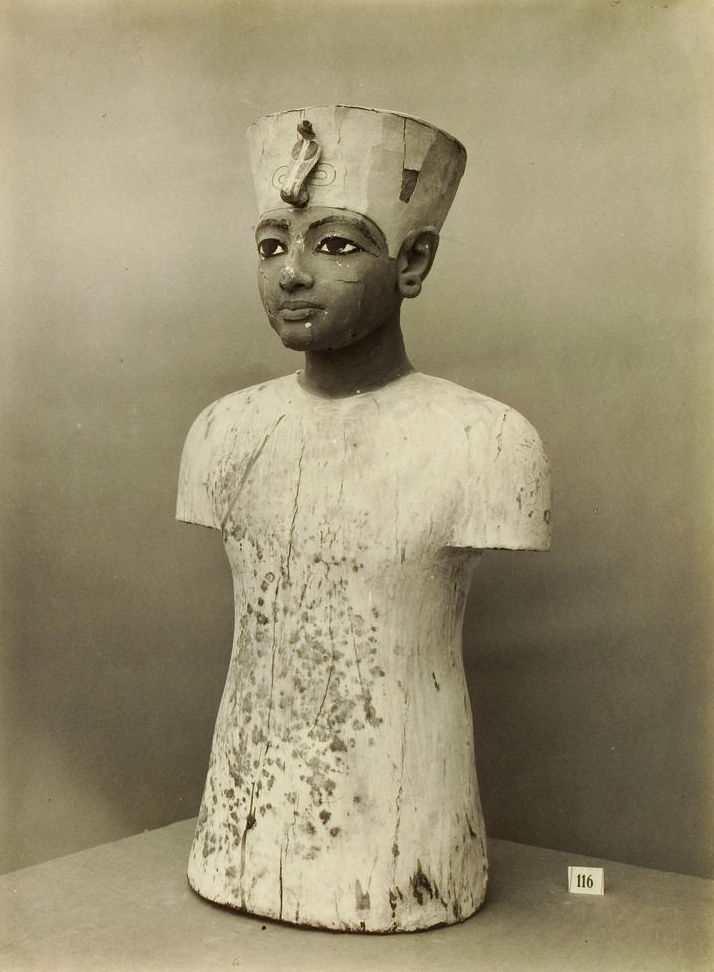
A painted, wooden figure of Tutankhamun suggested to be a mannequin for clothing

Details about Tutankhamun's health and early death are heavily debated, and there has been extensive investigation into various hypothesized medical diagnoses, especially about his death. The majority of the diagnoses stem from research conducted on Tutankhamun's mummy, via CT scans and genetic testing, such as the 2005 CT scans of his mummy. Out of the many hypothesized medical conditions of Tutankhamun, two of them have been confirmed to have afflicted him during his lifetime, namely, a malarial infection and a leg fracture. Various podiatric diagnoses have also been suggested. In particular, a left clubfoot diagnosis has been a subject of much debate in conjunction with debate about the purpose of the numerous walking sticks discovered in Tutankhamun's tomb. Furthermore, upon the results of later research, some of the medical diagnoses suggested have been dismissed as confirmed misdiagnoses.

In addition to investigations of his medical health, there has also been an investigation of his dental health. CT investigations of Tutankhamun's skull revealed an excellent condition of his dentition in comparison to other ancient Egyptian mummies. He had large front incisors and an overbite characteristic of the Thutmosid royal line to which he belonged.

==== Malaria ====
Malaria was endemic in ancient Egypt, as the Nile Delta provided ideal ecological conditions for robust reproduction of the mosquitos carrying the Plasmodium falciparum parasite responsible for causing human malarial infections. A 2023 meta-analysis study found that 22% of ancient Egyptian mummies tested positive for malaria. Genetic testing on Tutankhamun for STEVOR, AMA1, or MSP1 genes specific for Plasmodium falciparum revealed indications of malaria tropica in Tutankhamun's mummy. The team discovered DNA from several strains of the parasite, indicating that he was repeatedly infected with the most severe strain of malaria. It has been speculated that his malaria infections may have contributed to a fatal immune response in the body or triggered circulatory shock.

==== Leg fracture ====
The 2005 CT scan also showed that Tutankhamun had experienced a compound left leg fracture. The counter-argument of the injury being the result of modern mummy damage has been ruled out due to the ragged edges of the fracture; this is in contrast to modern mummy damage edge patterns, which feature sharp edges. Additionally, embalming substances were present within the fracture, indicating that the wound was present before Tutankhamun's mummification. No signs of healing were present, suggesting that the wound occurred very recently before Tutankhamun's death. In overview, it is reasonable to conclude that Tutankhamun died from leg fracture complications, possibly exacerbated by malarial infection. Egyptologist Raymond Johnson has remarked that it is possible that the leg injury occurred during battle while Tutankhamun was on a military campaign.

==== Speculated podiatric diagnoses ====
Tutankhamun has been associated with various speculated podiatric diagnoses. As a result of the 2005 CT scans, it has been hypothesized that he had a flat right foot with hypophalangism. It is also hypothesized that he had bone necrosis of the second and third metatarsal bones (Freiberg disease or Köhler disease II).

Another podiatric diagnosis of Tutankhamun is a left clubfoot, which is heavily disputed. If he was inflicted with clubfoot, it could have forced him to walk with the use of a cane as a mobility aid. More than 130 various canes and sticks were found in his tomb. Some scholars interpret this as evidence of podiatric illness, but this is heavily disputed. Many of the sticks were not of a medical type, and were instead fashion accessory sticks like crooks or sceptres such as was-sceptres, which served as types of staffs of office. Furthermore, alternatively to usage for clinical assistance, the canes were status symbols functioning as royal regalia for religious rituals and public appearances. Egyptologist Nick Brown has articulated that Tutankhamun's sticks "served as essentially kingly insignia during his rule, not as walking aids". Records of other ancient Egyptians' stick usage are consistent with this. For example, the tomb of ancient Egyptian nomarch, Djehutynakht, had over 250 walking sticks in his tomb, while pharaoh Amenhotep II, known for his athletic prowess, is depicted being gifted 30 walking sticks in artwork in tomb TT93, the tomb of Ken-Amun.

Another factor in the walking sticks being regalia, as opposed to assistive canes, is the pattern of wear on the sticks. None of them shows the extent of wear expected of essential aids. Also, the wear on Tutankhamun's sandals, where present, was even on both feet. This symmetry indicates that Tutankhamun was not relying more on one foot for mobility, challenging speculated podiatric diagnoses. Around 2020, the Tutankhamun's Sticks and Staves Project was launched to investigate by an international team of scientists that aimed to analyze the various stick objects in Tutankhamun's tomb. One of the main research goals was to investigate signs of usage on the sticks. The results were that there was very little wear on the sticks, indicating that they were not used to an extent that one would expect if Tutankhamun was using them as assistive canes. The researchers concluded:

These sticks were not used as supports, and were more likely ceremonial accessories/objects that did not hit the ground frequently... it does not seem as if Tutankhamun leant heavily for support on the sticks that have been found in his tomb...The absence of wear on the tips of the sticks suggests that the king was stronger and more able-bodied than has been suggested, not needing a stick as walking aid, but using it more as a stylish accessory or as part of his royal regalia, as would have been the case for any other pharaoh.

This research is consistent with prior research conducted examining the extent of usage of the sticks. Overall, evidence points towards Tutankhamun having healthy mobility.

==== Misdiagnoses ====
Multiple speculated medical diagnoses of Tutankhamun have been dismissed as misdiagnoses due to the results of further investigation. In attempts to explain Tutankhamun's unusual depiction in art and his early death, it had been speculated that Tutankhamun was inflicted with gynecomastia, Marfan syndrome, sagittal craniosynostosis syndrome, Antley–Bixler syndrome or one of its variants. However, later genetic testing through STR analysis rejected the hypothesis of gynecomastia and craniosynostoses (e.g., Antley–Bixler syndrome) or Marfan syndrome.

James Gamble had instead suggested that Tutankhamun's left clubfoot position is a result of Tutankhamun habitually walking on the outside of his foot due to the pain caused by Köhler disease II. This hypothesis has been refuted by members of Hawass' team.

Some researchers have speculated that Tutankhamun was physically weak and frail, but CT scan results show no indications of abnormal weakness.

==== Other speculated diagnoses ====
Also, as an explanation attempt of certain art depictions and an early death, it has been surmised that Tutankhamun may have had Wilson–Turner X-linked intellectual disability syndrome, Fröhlich syndrome (adiposogenital dystrophy), Klinefelter syndrome, androgen insensitivity syndrome, or aromatase excess syndrome. It has also been suggested that he had inherited temporal lobe epilepsy in a bid to explain the religiosity of his great-grandfather Thutmose IV and father Akhenaten and their early deaths. However, caution has been urged in this diagnosis. Timmann and Meyer have argued that sickle cell anemia fits exhibited pathologies exhibited, a suggestion Hawass's team has called "interesting and plausible".

Researchers argued that the results of the 2005 mummy CT scan suggest Tutankhamun had a partial cleft palate on his hard palate. Researchers also speculated that had mild scoliosis. Nevertheless, Tutankhamun's vertebra did not display any rotation or deformation, suggesting that the mummy spinal curvature resulted from embalmer handling.

=== Physical appearance ===
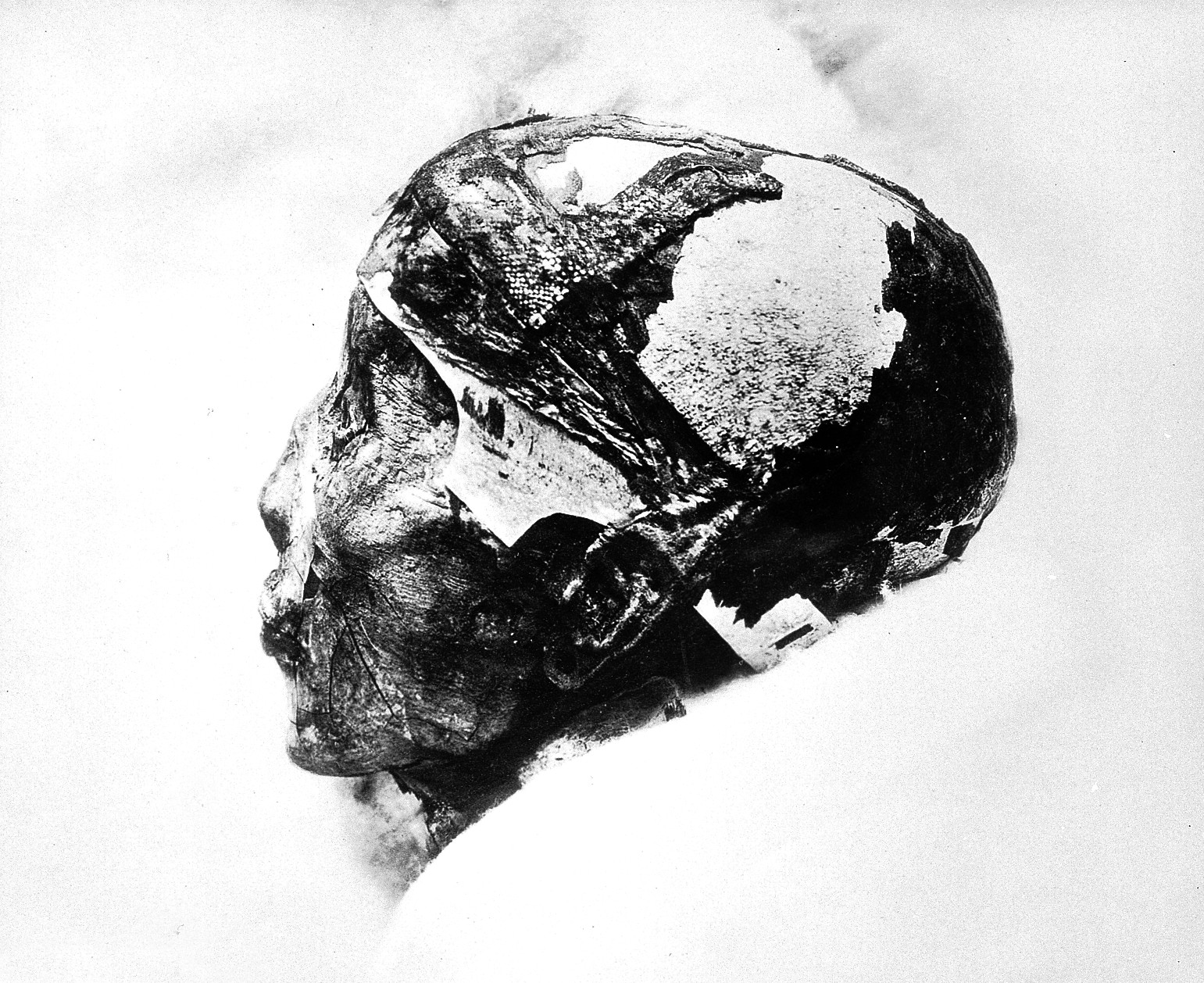
Close-up of Tutankhamun's mummified head

The appearance of ancient Egyptians, especially Tutankhamun, has remained an area of inquiry and debate. Tutankhamun was of lean slender build. His mummy measured approximately 167 cm (5 ft 6 in) tall, which was on the taller side of average for a man of this time period. Analysis of the clothing found in his tomb, particularly the dimensions of his loincloths and belts suggest that he had a narrower waist and rounder hips. However, as a section of his left pelvis is missing, there has not been skeletal confirmation.

Multiple attempts have been made to reconstruct a computerized image of Tutankhamun's face, and there has been one attempt at reconstructing imagery of his full figure. Reconstructions have repeatedly incited controversy upon release.

==== Facial appearance ====
In 1983, forensic artist Betty Pat Gatliff, alongside forensic anthropologist Clyde Snow, developed a reconstruction image of Tutankhamun's face from a plaster cast of his skull.

In 2005, an extensively media-covered study by the Egyptian Supreme Council of Antiquities and National Geographic employed three different research teams (Egyptian, French, and American) to develop a facial image using CT scans of his skull. The Egyptian and French teams were informed that their subject was Tutankhamun, while the American team was not informed who the subject was, thereby working blindly. Results were generally similar, although the reconstruction did not resemble effigy artifacts of Tutankhamun. The depiction sparked controversy, particularly for its skin color, which also did not resemble painted effigies of Tutankhamun, such as the Head of Nefertem artifact or the mannequin artifact. Throughout the years, the image's light-skinned representation has ignited numerous picketing protests outside multiple Tutankhamun exhibits that included the depiction. Terry Garcia, executive vice president for mission programs for National Geographic in response to protests purported that Tutankhamun's exact skin tone is unknown and that they aimed for a middle skin tone.

In 2007, amidst more exhibition protests, anthropologist Nina Jablonski addressed what an educated guess of Tutankhamun's skin tone might be:

"Our best guess is that he was neither lily white nor ebony black. He was probably somewhere in between... When we look at the representation of the Egyptian royalty on the walls of tombs, we see a range of sort of moderate, tan-colored skin on the royalty. This probably is a fairly close approximation of what skin color these people actually had."

In 2008, Egyptologist Stuart Tyson Smith criticized the skin-tone choice of the 2005 study, stating that the light skin tone was indicative of a bias, elaborating that ancient Egyptians were generally of darker skin tone, especially in more southern regions. In 2022, bioarcheologist Andrew Nelson used CT scans and the 3D bioimaging software, Dragonfly, to create a virtual model of Tutankhamun's face. The result was distinct from prior reconstructions from skull CT scans. Nelson stated that the skull anatomy guided the project which made for a more realistic reconstruction. Nelson's study did not overlay a skin tone on the facial reconstruction. In 2023, researchers developed a new version of Tutankhamun's face using further CT scans. Results greatly resembled the results of the CT scan reconstruction performed in 2005. The skin tone was also akin to the skin tone chosen in the 2005 study.

Depictions of Tutankhamun deemed Afrocentristic have repeatedly generated protest and tension. In 2023, an exhibit titled "Kemet: Egypt in Hip-Hop, Jazz, Soul and Funk" at the Dutch National Museum of Antiquities in Leiden, Netherlands depicted a statue of rapper Nas's (1999) I Am... album cover, which portrays Nas's face in the Mask of Tutankhamun. Egyptian antiquities expert Abd al-Rahim Rihan accused the exhibit curators of promoting Afrocentric pseudohistory by displaying the Tutankhamun mask with black facial features, indirectly advocating the black Egyptian hypothesis. Similarly, Ahmed Belal, an Egyptian member of parliament, accused the exhibit curators of "distorting Egyptian identity" and "attacking Egyptian heritage and civilization." The exhibit curators denied the accusations, stating that the exhibit takes a neutral position on the race of ancient Egyptians. Daniel Soliman, the exhibition curator, who himself is half-Egyptian, stated that some Egyptians feel an exclusive possession to the pharaonic heritage, while the African diaspora's artistic vision of ancient Egypt has been ignored. Museum director Wim Weijland stated that the exhibition is about art, not racially classifying ancient Egyptians.

Egyptian journalist, Shahira Amin, in a 2023 article titled "Egyptians aren't racist. They're frustrated with Western appropriation of their ancient history", wrote that "many Egyptians shun their Africanness, preferring to associate themselves with the Middle East and identify as Muslims and Arabs."

==== Full-body reconstruction ====
In a 2014 BBC documentary, presented by Dallas Campbell, titled Tutankhamun: The Truth Uncovered, revealed results of a computerized forensic reconstruction of Tutankhamun's body that harnessed 2,000 CT scans of Tutankhamun's mummy to generate an image of his body. The resultant image depicted Tutankhamun in his underwear, physically infirm with a club foot, an overbite, a gynecomastic chest, and multiple other visible physical disorders. The reconstruction was controversial, characterized as being of poor taste, and likened to a humiliation ritual. Jonathan Jones of The Guardian articulated that the imagery was a "morbid freak show" and "crass and vulgar infotainment". Egyptologist Zahi Hawass criticized that the virtual reconstruction of Tutankhamun's body was scientifically unfounded. Disability studies scholars have criticized the reconstruction of Tutankhamun, stating that they were derogatory and "seemed designed to exaggerate the physical features of said impairments, rather than offer any scientific value, let alone any humanity or recognition that this historical figure was a man".

=== Ancestral genotyping ===
A genetic study, published in 2020, revealed Tutankhamun had the haplogroups YDNA R1b, which originally left Africa, became R1b in Western Asia, then split again and migrated back into Africa from North Africa between 8000 and 7000 years ago during the 'Green Sahara' period. Which is closely related to Chadic Peoples like the Fulani. mtDNA K, which originated in the Near East. He shares this Y-haplogroup with his father, the KV55 mummy (Akhenaten), and grandfather, Amenhotep III (and his entire male ancestral line), and his mtDNA haplogroup with his mother, The Younger Lady, his grandmother, Tiye, and his great-grandmother, Thuya (and his entire female ancestral line). The profiles for Tutankhamun and Amenhotep III were incomplete, and the analysis produced differing probability figures despite having concordant allele results. Because the relationships of these two mummies with the KV55 mummy had previously been confirmed in an earlier study, the haplogroup prediction of both mummies could be derived from the full profile of the KV55 data.

In 2022, S.O.Y. Keita analysed 8 Short Tandem loci (STR) data originally published by Hawass et al. in studies from 2010 and 2012. The first of these studies had investigated familial relationships among 11 royal mummies of the New Kingdom, which included Tutankhamun and Amenhotep III, as well as potential inherited disorders and infectious diseases. The second of these studies had investigated the Y-haplogroups and genetic kinship of Ramesses III and an unknown man buried along with him in the royal cache at Deir el Bahari. Keita analysed the STR data from these studies using an algorithm that only has three choices: Eurasians, sub-Saharan Africans, and East Asians. Using these three options, Keita concluded that the majority of the samples had a population "affinity with 'sub-Saharan' Africans in one affinity analysis". However, Keita cautioned that this does not mean that the royal mummies "lacked other affiliations", which he argued had been obscured in typological thinking. Keita further added that different "data and algorithms might give different results", reflecting the complexity of biological heritage and the associated interpretation.

In 2025, biochemist Jean-Philippe Gourdine reviewed genetic data on the Ancient Egyptian populations in the international scholarly publication, General History of Africa Volume IX. Expanding on a previous STR analysis co-performed with Keita, on the Amarna royal mummies which included Tutankhamun, Gourdine stated the analysis had found "that they had strong affinities with current sub-Saharan populations: 41 per cent to 93.9 per cent for sub-Saharan Africa, compared to 4.6 per cent to 41 per cent for Eurasia and 0.3 per cent to 16 per cent for Asia (Gourdine, 2018)." He also referenced comparable analysis conducted by DNA Tribes company, which specialized in genetic genealogy and had large datasets, with the latter having identified strong affinities between the Amarna royal mummies and Sub-Saharan African populations.

In 2025, Christopher Ehret, David Schoenbrun, Steven A Brandt and Shomarka Keita issued a multidisciplinary review, noting the R1b M89 haplogroup subtype identified among the three Amarna pharaohs (Tutankhamun, Amenhotep III and Akhenaten) was not further specified. The authors also stated that the R1b haplogroup usually interpreted as indicating a back migration to Africa from or via the Near East could have been attributed to Asian back migration or trans-Saharan connections as the genetic marker is found at relative high frequencies among Chadic populations. Referencing a Short Tandem Report (STR) autosomal background analysis on the Amarna royal mummies, performed by Keita in an earlier publication, the authors considered this analysis could suggest closer trans-Saharan connections. Ehret et al also disclosed through personal communication with the Gad team that "other eighteenth dynasty lineages in the Amarna period were found to be E1b1a (Gad et al 2020)". The authors further postulated that association of the palaeolithic Asian lineage (R1B) and an affiliation that is tropical African (E1b1a) is an example of admixture found in some Nile Valley populations, and that a mixture of lineages could illustrate Egypt being near a crossroads.

== Death ==
There are no surviving records of the circumstances of Tutankhamun's death; it has been the subject of considerable debate and major studies. Hawass and his team postulate that his death was likely the result of the combination of his multiple weakening disorders, his femur fracture, perhaps as the result of a fall, and a severe malarial infection.

Murder by a blow to the head was hypothesised as a result of the 1968 x-ray, which showed two bone fragments inside the skull. This hypothesis was then disproved by further analysis of the x-rays and the CT scan. The intercranial bone fragments were determined to be the result of the modern unwrapping of the mummy, as they are loose and not adherent to the embalming resin. No evidence of bone thinning or calcified membranes, which could be indicative of a fatal blow to the head, was found. It has also been suggested that Tutankhamun was killed in a chariot accident due to a pattern of crushing injuries, including the fact that the front part of his chest wall and ribs are missing. However, the missing ribs are unlikely to be a result of an injury sustained at the time of death; photographs taken at the conclusion of Carter's excavation in 1926 show that the chest wall of the king was intact, still wearing a beaded collar with falcon-headed terminals. The absence of both the collar and chest wall was noted in the 1968 x-ray and further confirmed by the CT scan. The front part of his chest was likely removed by robbers during the theft of the beaded collar; the intricate beaded skullcap the king was pictured wearing in 1926 was also missing by 1968.

=== Funeral ===
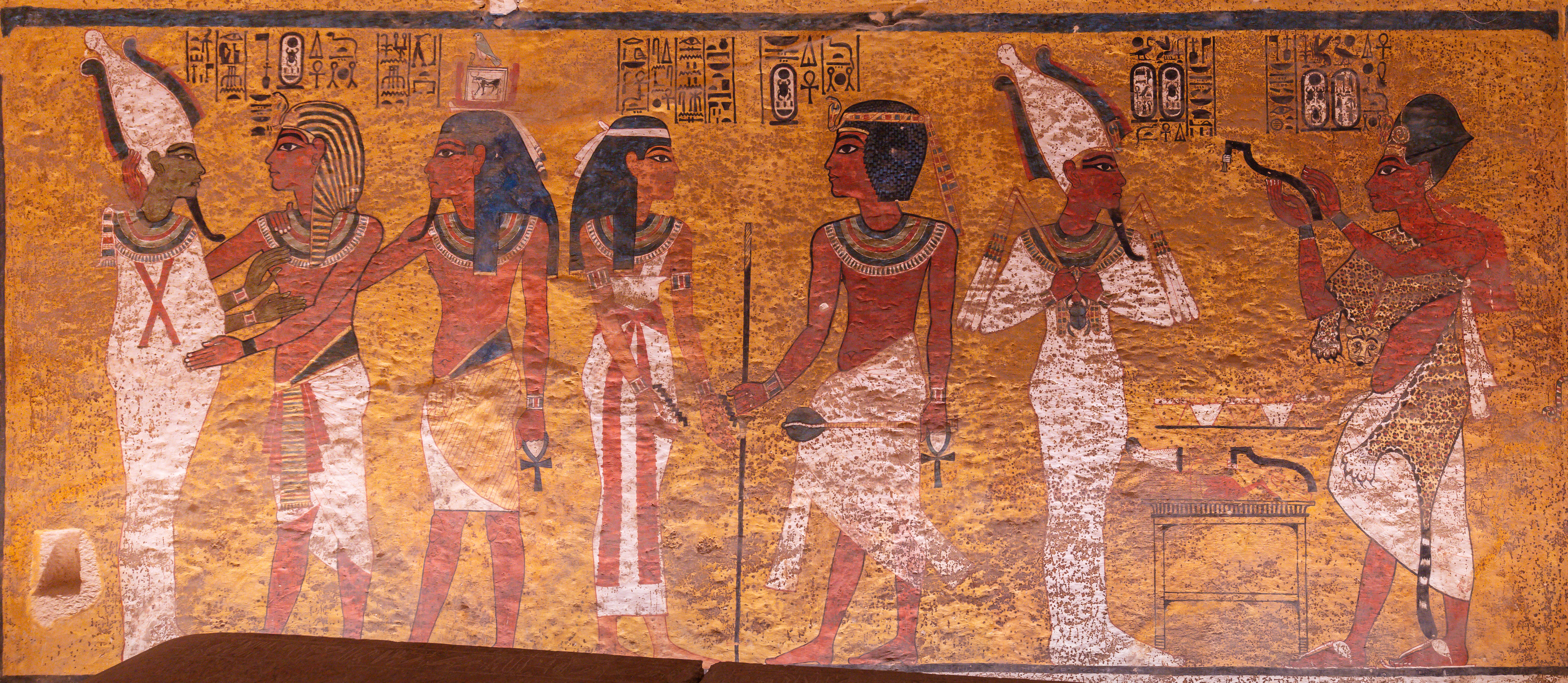
Scenes from the north wall of the burial chamber of Tutankhamun. On the left side, Tutankhamun, followed by his ka (an aspect of his soul), embraces the god of the dead Osiris. In the center, Tutankhamun is greeting the goddess Nut. On the right side, Ay performs the opening of the mouth for Tutankhamun

A funeral was held for Tutankhamun upon his death. Funerary floral analysis provides evidence for the relative time of year of the funeral. Egyptologist Renate Germer has deduced from the funerary floral seasonal selection and its counterpart located on innermost coffin that the funeral occurred between the end of February and mid-March. Egyptologist Rolf Krauss proposed a slightly later date of March to April.

Ay was certainly in attendance at the funeral. He is depicted performing the opening of the mouth ritual for the deceased, Osiris Tutankhamun, on the north wall of the burial chamber. This procedure was standard for the next pharaoh, indicating that Ay's position as pharaoh was established by the time of Tutankhamun's funeral.

A man named Nahktmin was a general during the reign of Tutankhamun. His presence at Tutankhamun's funeral is evidenced by discovered funerary goods, shabti figures, donated by him.

Horemheb's presence at the funeral is debated. Some argue that Horemheb was away on a military campaign against Asiatics during the funeral, noting that there are no burial good donations from him. In the funerary procession depiction in Tutankhamun’s tomb, there is an unidentified figure shown closest to the mummy. Egyptologist Nozomu Kawai identifies that figure as Horemheb, suggesting that Horemheb held a leading role in the procession. The other interpretation is that that figure is the representation of Tutankhamun's ka, considered to be an aspect of one's soul in ancient Egyptian theology.

=== Mortuary cult ===
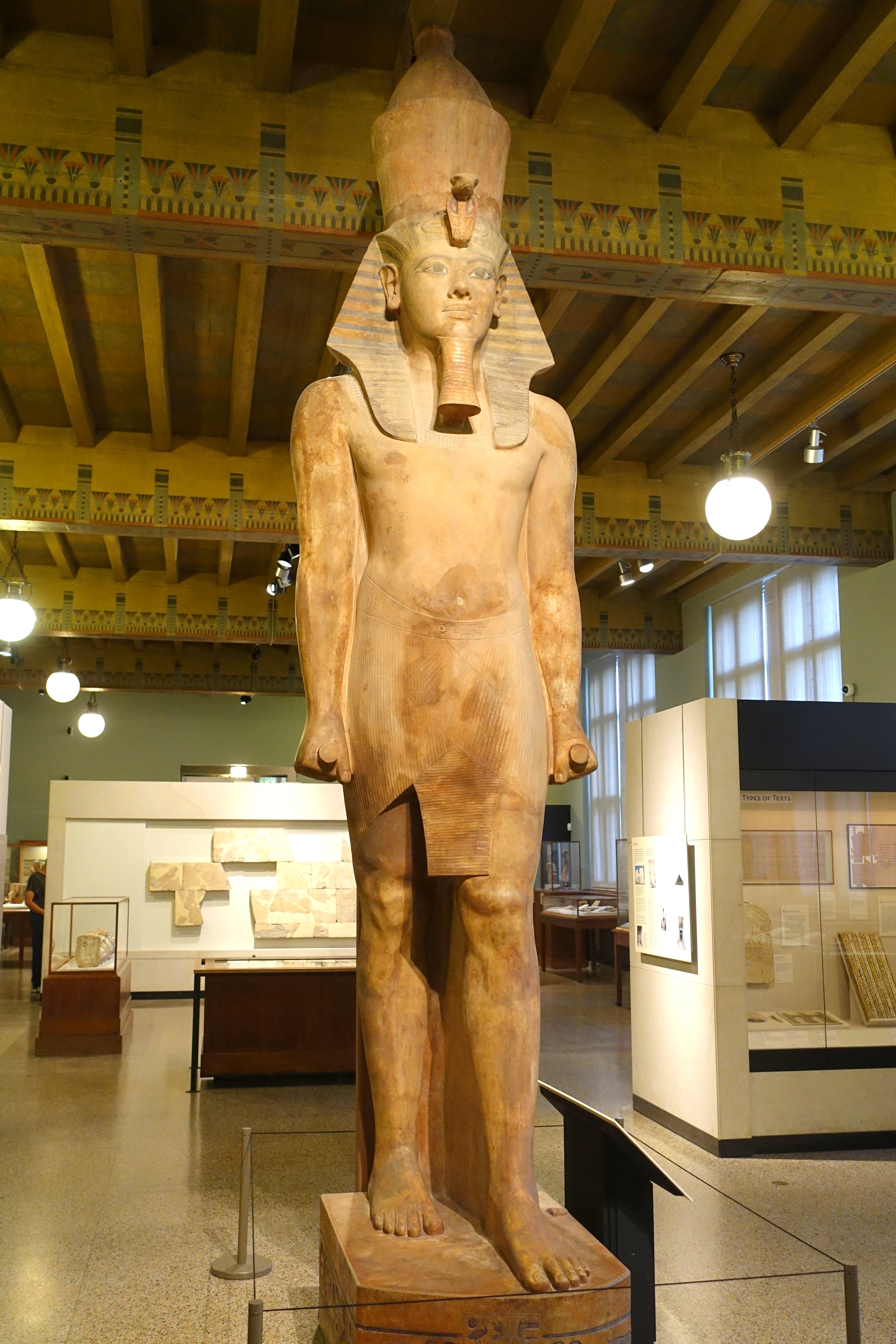
One of the colossal statues of Tutankhamun found in the temple of Ay and Horemheb.

It was standard for a deceased pharaoh to be worshipped in the form of a mortuary cult also known as a funerary cult. The text of the stela of Userhat, which is currently housed at the Metropolitan Museum of Art, indicates that an official named Userhat was a priest in the mortuary cult of Tutankhamun, evidencing that Tutankhamun's mortuary cult was in fact active. Userhat also served in the mortuary cult of pharaoh Amenhotep III, indicating an interconnection between the two pharaoh's mortuary cults.

The existence of a mortuary temple of Tutankhamun at Western-Thebes is well attested by various archeological sources.

The discovery of two colossal statues of the pharaoh Tutankhamun among the ruins of the mortuary temple of Ay and Horemheb had suggested that the building may have been originally the mortuary temple of Tutankhamun. The two colossal statues did not originally bare the name of Tutankhamun, but rather the name of Ay, which was later usurped by Horemheb. However, the style of the statues, with features characteristic of the Amarna Period, indicates that they were likely sculpted before Ay's reign and have been attributed to Tutankhamun. It is believed that these statues were commissioned by Tutankhamun for his own mortuary temple but only completed posthumously and subsequently appropriated by Ay during his own reign.

In any case, the presence of Ay's name on the foundation deposit of the temple of Ay and Horemheb confirms that the building was constructed for Ay, even if either of them reused elements from Tutankhamun's temple. The mortuary temple of Tutankhamun that was actually used by Tutankhamun's mortuary cult was likely destroyed by Horemheb, and its remains had never been found. Notably, the search for the temple of Tutankhamun near the temple of Ay and Horemheb led to the discovery of the lost city of Aten in 2021.

== Succession ==
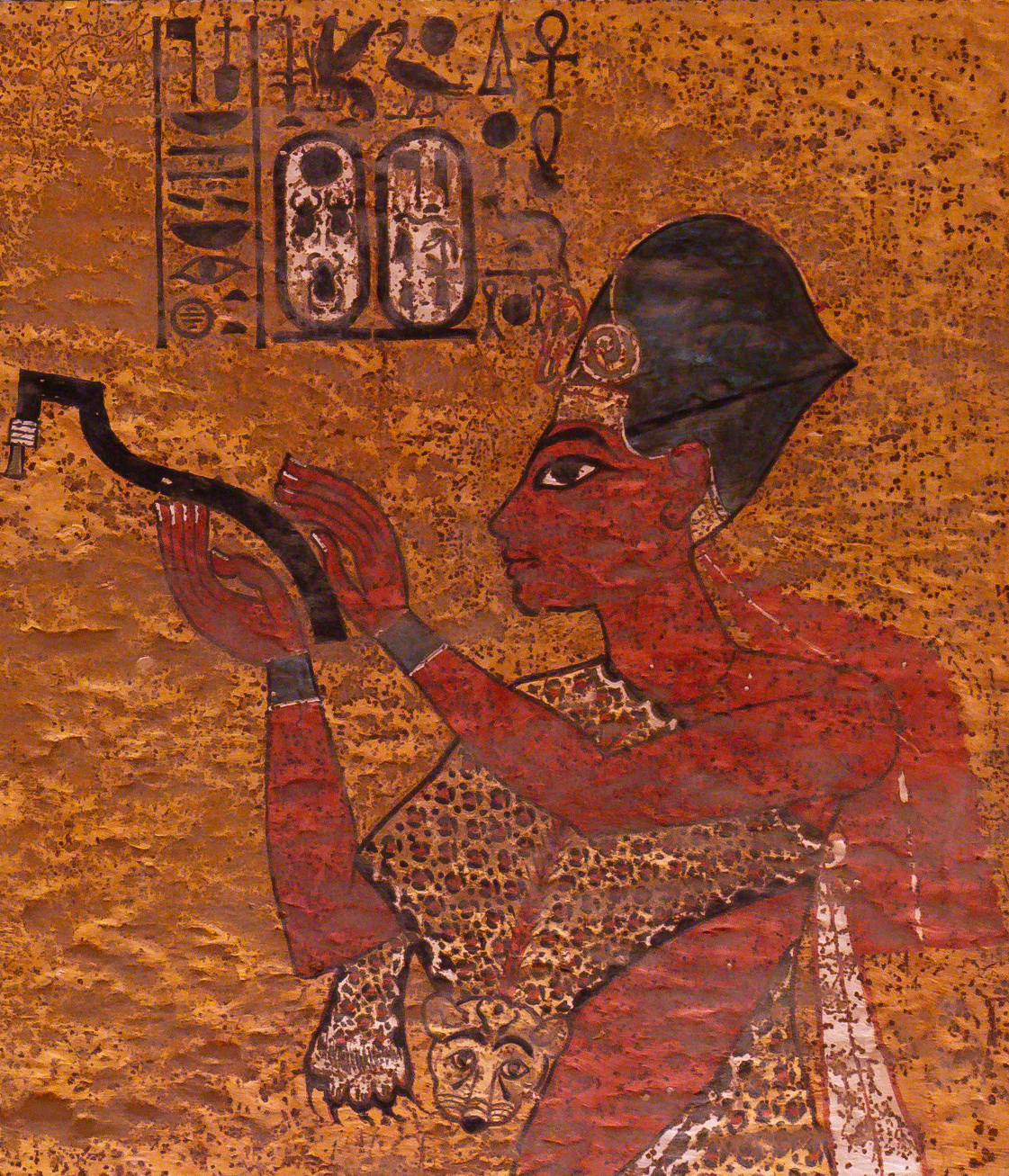
Ay performing the Opening of the mouth ceremony on Tutankhamun

The succession of the throne of Tutankhamun was complicated by the resulting power vacuum. His two known children were either stillborn or died shortly after birth and he was presumably the last of the royal male siblings. His death therefore left no immediate heir apparent. Horemheb was designated as Iry-pat essentially which meant heir presumptive at this time. Nevertheless, more than one person held this title, so the use of the term to refer to heir presumptive was questioned. However, if Queen Ankhesenamun is identified with Dakhamunzu, some have argued she may have been able to transfer kingship to a husband, but would have preferred not to marry someone of lesser status than royal status. Horemheb was a military man of non-royal birth and was, as the military commander-in-chief, technically a servant of Queen Ankhesenamun. Ay, while technically a servant of Queen Ankhesenamun, was of some royal blood, thus at least partially meeting this royal criterion. These suggested spousal preferences of Ankhesenamun could have ignited a series of disruptions in the designation of Tutankhamun's preferred heir. Yet, the assumption that Ay married Ankhesenamun has been challenged. The appearance of the king's and Ankhesenamun's names together on a glass object may not necessarily imply marriage; it may instead reflect interaction between the widowed queen and the new king. Ay's wife Tey retained her status during his reign and became Great Royal Wife.

=== Ay interregnum ===
Seeking to resolve her spousal dilemma, Ankhesenamun may have inadvertently generated a predicament involving the Hittite king Suppiluliuma I and his son, prince Zannanza, known as the Zannanza affair, although Ankhesenamun's identification as the Egyptian queen in question is not definite. Meanwhile, during this interregnum period, Ay was crowned as pharaoh, circumventing the other claims. This is supported by Ay's depiction presiding over Tutankhamun's funeral, customary for the successor pharaoh, and by Horemheb's apparent absence from it.

Toward the end of Ay's reign, Ay named probably his son, generalissimo Nakhtmin, as his successor. However, Nakhtmin died before he could become pharaoh and his name was subsequently erased during Horemheb's reign. Another individual named Nay has also been proposed as potential heir of Ay, but Horemheb does not appear to have taken action against him.

=== Reign of Horemheb ===
Horemheb succeeded to the throne as pharaoh after Ay's death. He initiated what Peter J. Brand has termed the "Second Restoration". In the later years of his reign he had his own name inscribed on monuments originally commisioned by Tutankhamun. Initially, Horemheb's damnatio memoriae was directed only at Ay, but it was later extended to Tutankhamun and the other Amarna-period kings. Horemheb defaced Ay's tomb but left Tutankhamun's untouched, presumably out of respect. Nevertheless, Horemheb's damnatio memoriae campaign was one of the most elaborate and successful damnatio memoriae campaigns in Egyptian history.

In time, Horemheb selected Ramesses I then a military officer, as his heir. Ramesses I's grandson, Ramesses II, would become one of the most renowned pharaohs of ancient Egypt and prominent ruler of the Ramesside dynasty. This initiated a new royal bloodline, replacing the royal bloodline that ended with the death of Tutankhamun.

== Tomb ==
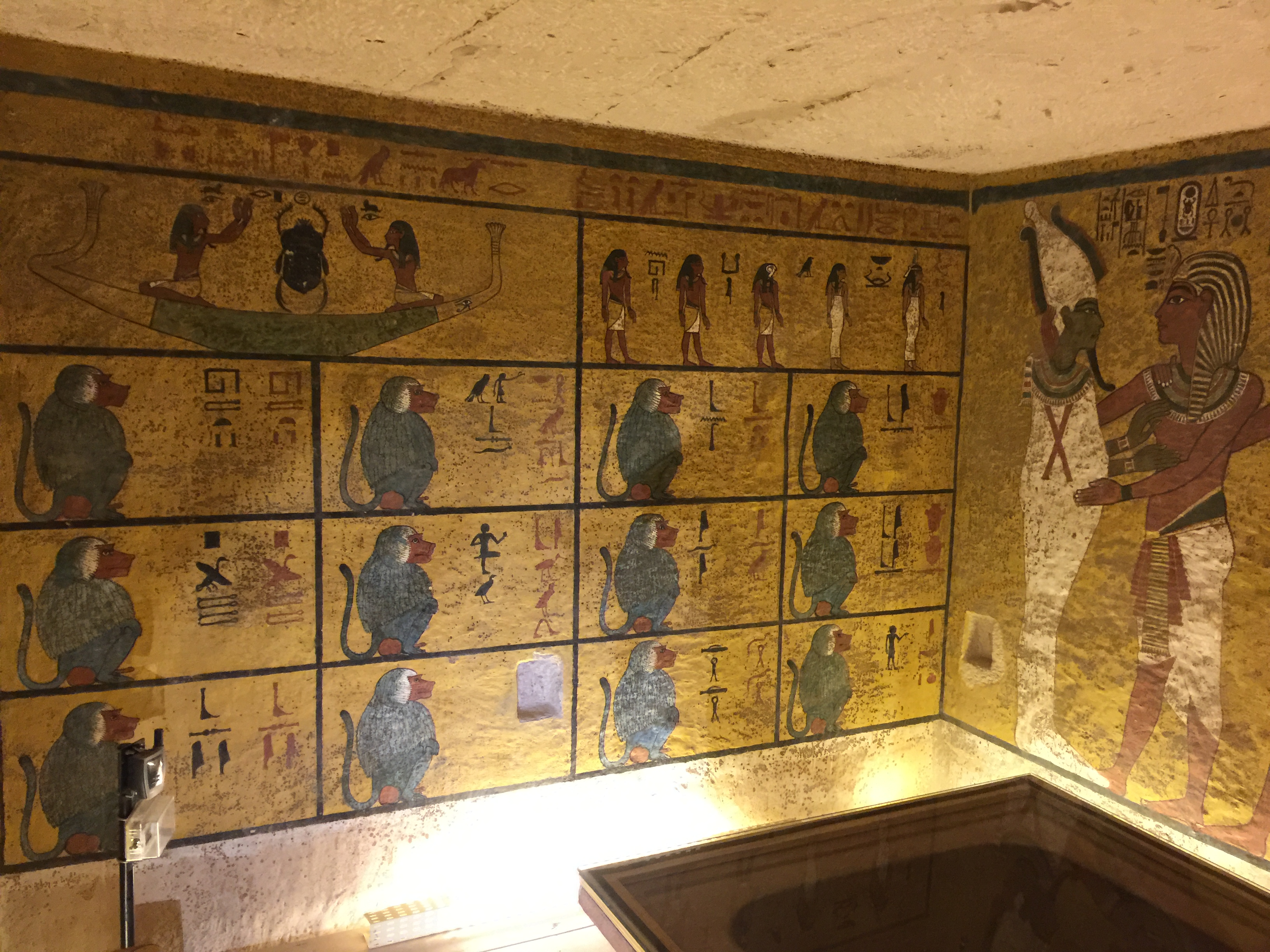
The wall decorations in KV62's burial chamber are modest in comparison with other royal tombs found in the Valley of the Kings

Tutankhamun was buried in a tomb that was unusually small considering his status. His death may have occurred unexpectedly, before the completion of a grander royal tomb, causing his mummy to be buried in a tomb intended for someone else. This would preserve the observance of the customary 70 days between death and burial. His tomb was robbed at least twice in antiquity, but based on the items taken (including perishable oils and perfumes) and the evidence of restoration of the tomb after the intrusions, these robberies likely took place within several months at most of the initial burial. The location of the tomb was lost because it had come to be buried by debris from subsequent tombs, and workers' houses were built over the tomb entrance.

=== Rediscovery ===
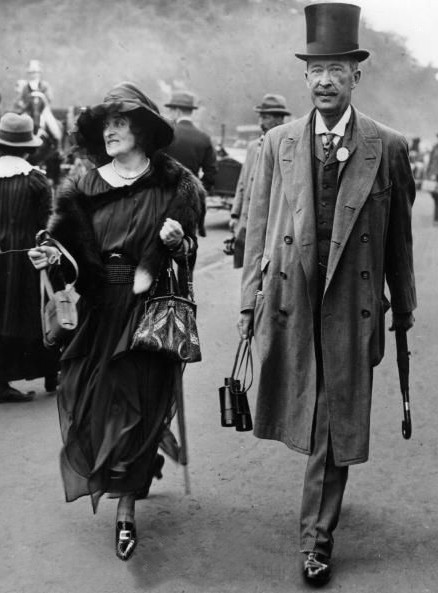
George Herbert, 5th Earl of Carnarvon, 1921

The concession rights for excavating the Valley of the Kings were held by Theodore Davis from 1905 until 1914. In that time, he had unearthed ten tombs, including the nearly intact but non-royal tomb of Queen Tiye's parents, Yuya and Thuya. As he continued working there in the later years, he uncovered nothing of major significance. Davis did find several objects in KV58 referring to Tutankhamun, which included knobs and handles bearing his name, most significantly the embalming cache of the king (KV54). He believed this to be the pharaoh's lost tomb and published his findings as such with the line; "I fear the Valley of the Tombs is exhausted". In 1907, Howard Carter was invited by William Garstin and Gaston Maspero to excavate for George Herbert, 5th Earl of Carnarvon in the Valley. The Earl of Carnarvon and Carter had hoped this would lead to their gaining the concession when Davis gave it up, but had to be satisfied with excavations in different parts of the Theban Necropolis for seven more years.

After a systematic search beginning in 1915, Carter discovered the actual tomb of Tutankhamun (KV62) in November 1922. An ancient stroke of luck allowed the tomb to survive to modern times. The tomb's entrance was buried by mounds of debris from the cutting of KV9 over 150 years after Tutankhamun's burial; ancient workmen's huts were also built on the site. This area remained unexcavated until 1922 due to its proximity to KV9, as excavations would impede tourist access to that tomb. Carter commenced excavations in early November 1922, before the height of the tourist season. The first step of the tomb's entrance staircase was uncovered on 4 November 1922. According to Carter's account, the workmen discovered the step while digging beneath the remains of the huts; Other accounts attribute the discovery to a boy named Hussein Abdul Rasoul (Water boy) who was digging outside the designated work area. (Note: Karl Kitchen, a reporter for the Boston Globe, wrote in 1924 that a boy named Mohamed Gorgar had found the step; he interviewed Gorgar, who did not say whether the story was true. Lee Keedick, the organiser of Carter's American lecture tour, said Carter attributed the discovery to an unnamed boy carrying water for the workmen. Many recent accounts, such as the 2018 book Tutankhamun: Treasures of the Golden Pharaoh by the Egyptologist Zahi Hawass, identify the water-boy as Hussein Abd el-Rassul, a member of a prominent local family. Hawass says that he heard this story from el-Rassul in person. Another Egyptologist, Christina Riggs, suggests the story may instead be a conflation of Keedick's account, which was widely publicised by the 1978 book Tutankhamun: The Untold Story by Thomas Hoving, with el-Rassul's long-standing claim to have been the boy who was photographed wearing one of Tutankhamun's pectorals in 1926.)

By February 1923, the antechamber had been cleared of everything but two sentinel statues. A day and time were selected to unseal the tomb with about twenty appointed witnesses that included Lord Carnarvon, several Egyptian officials, museum representatives, and the staff of the Government Press Bureau. On 17 February 1923 at just after two o'clock, the seal was broken.

Letters published in 2022 of correspondence between Rex Engelbach and Alan Gardiner reveal that Howard Carter had stolen objects from the tomb before the tomb was officially opened. For instance, Rex Engelbach said in a letter to Gardiner about a 'whm amulet' gifted to Gardiner from Carter that "The whm amulet you showed me has been undoubtedly stolen from the tomb of Tutankhamun."

=== Contents ===
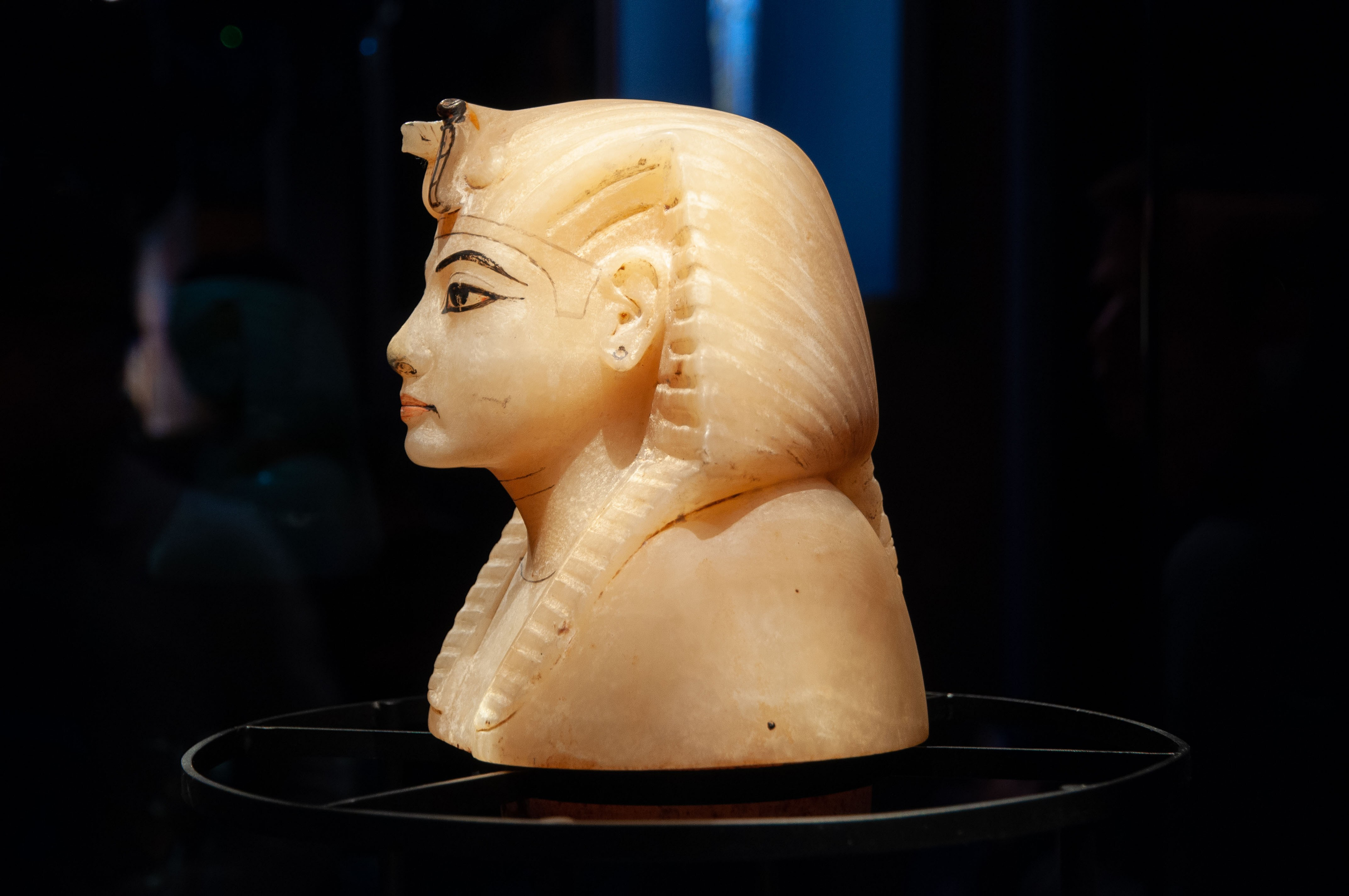
An alabaster stopper from his canopic chest

Tutankhamun's tomb is the only royal tomb in the Valley of the Kings found in near-intact condition. There were 5,398 items found in the tomb, including a solid gold coffin, face mask, thrones, archery bows, trumpets, a lotus chalice, two Imiut fetishes, gold toe stalls, furniture, food, wine, sandals, and fresh linen underwear. Howard Carter took 10 years to catalog the items. Analysis from the 1960s onwards suggests a dagger recovered from the tomb had an iron blade made from a meteorite; study of artifacts of the time including other artifacts from Tutankhamun's tomb could provide valuable insights into metalworking technologies around the Mediterranean at the time. Complete study of the iron artefacts from the tomb (besides the blade of a richly decorated golden dagger, small iron chisel blades set into wooden handles, an Eye of Horus amulet, and a miniature headrest) demonstrated that all were made of similar material. Only in 2022, a complex technological and material study of the Tutankhamun's mask was published. Many of Tutankhamun's burial goods show signs of being adapted for his use after being originally made for earlier owners, probably Smenkhkare or Neferneferuaten or both. The golden Nut pectoral (Carter no. 261p1) or (Cairo JE61944) was reused for the funeral of Tutankhamun. Marc Gabolde successfully demonstrated that the original cartouches reinscribed on the pectoral with Tutankhamun's nomen and prenomen were those of Neferneferuaten with the variation of Ankhkheperure-Mery-Waenre and Neferneferuaten-Akhetenhies "One Who is Beneficial for Her Husband," proving Neferneferuaten was a female king who was at the same time the wife of Akhenaten. Traces of the cartouches of Neferneferuaten were also identified underneath the cartouches of Tutankhamun on the four miniature golden canopic coffins [of the Boy King]." On 4 November 2007, 85 years to the day after Carter's discovery, Tutankhamun's mummy was placed on display in his underground tomb at Luxor, when the linen-wrapped mummy was removed from its golden sarcophagus to a climate-controlled glass box. The case was designed to prevent the heightened rate of decomposition caused by the humidity and warmth from tourists visiting the tomb. In 2009, the tomb was closed for restoration by the Ministry of Antiquities and the Getty Conservation Institute. While the closure was originally planned for five years to restore the walls affected by humidity, the Egyptian revolution of 2011 set the project back. The tomb reopened in February 2019.

=== Rumoured curse ===
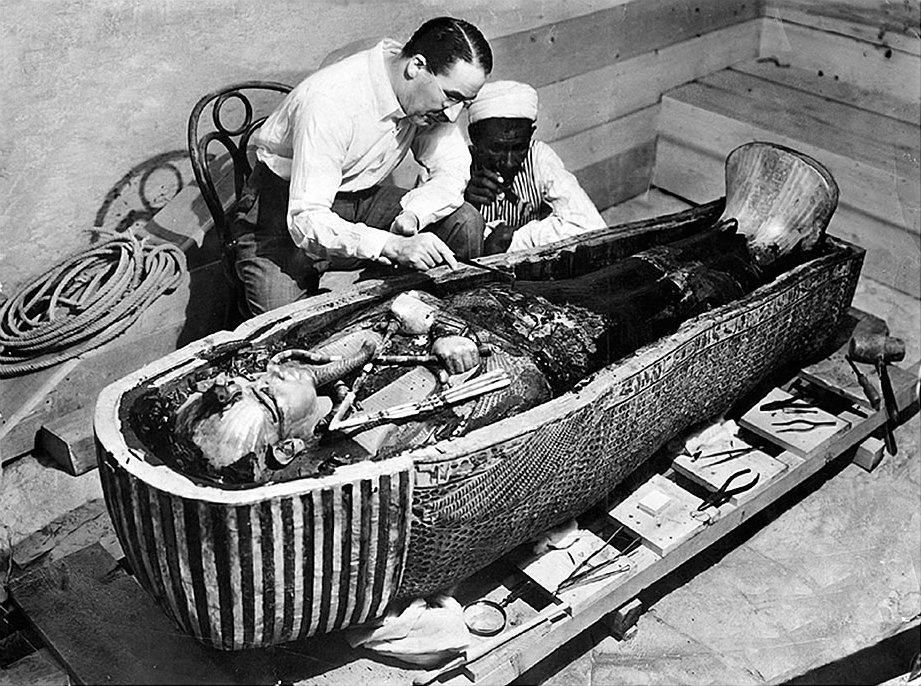
Howard Carter examining the innermost coffin of Tutankhamun, 1925

For many years, rumors of a "curse of the pharaohs" (probably fueled by newspapers seeking sales at the time of the discovery) persisted, emphasizing the early death of some of those who had entered the tomb. The most prominent was George Herbert, 5th Earl of Carnarvon, who died on 5 April 1923, five months after the discovery of the first step leading down to the tomb on 4 November 1922.

The cause of Carnarvon's death was pneumonia supervening on [facial] erysipelas (a streptococcal infection of the skin and underlying soft tissue). The Earl had been in an automobile accident in 1901, making him very unhealthy and frail. His doctor recommended a warmer climate, so in 1903, the Carnarvons traveled to Egypt, where the Earl became interested in Egyptology. Along with the stresses of the excavation, Carnarvon was already in a weakened state when an infection led to pneumonia.

A study showed that of the 58 people who were present when the tomb and sarcophagus were opened, only eight died within a dozen years; Howard Carter died of lymphoma in 1939 at the age of 64. The last survivors included Lady Evelyn Herbert, Lord Carnarvon's daughter who was among the first people to enter the tomb after its discovery in November 1922, who lived for a further 57 years and died in 1980, and American archaeologist J.O. Kinnaman who died in 1961, 39 years after the event.

== Legacy ==
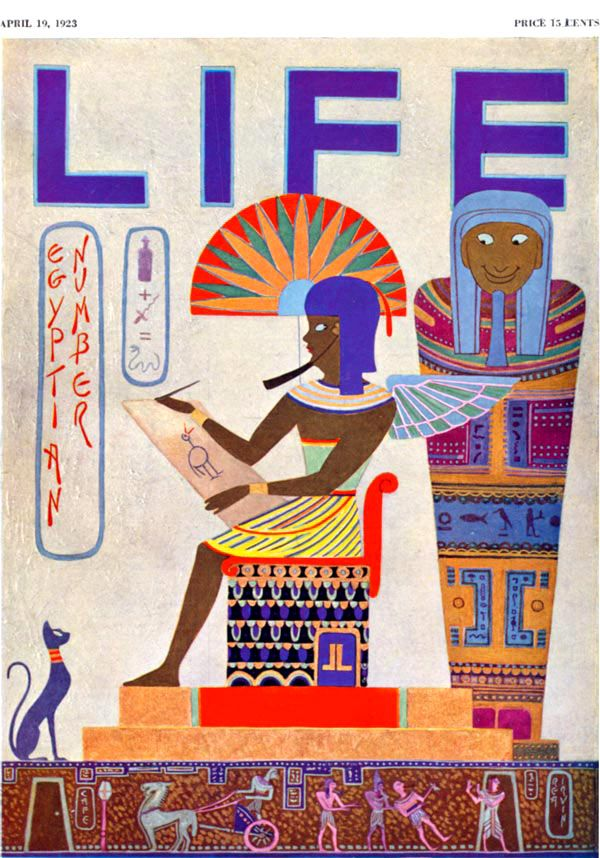
The "Egyptian Number" of Life, 19 April 1923

Tutankhamun's fame is primarily the result of his well-preserved tomb and the global exhibitions of his associated artifacts. As Jon Manchip White writes, in his foreword to the 1977 edition of Carter's The Discovery of the Tomb of Tutankhamun, "The pharaoh who in life was one of the least esteemed of Egypt's Pharaohs has become in death the most renowned".

The discoveries in the tomb were prominent news in the 1920s. Tutankhamen came to be called by a modern neologism, "King Tut". Ancient Egyptian references became common in popular culture, including Tin Pan Alley songs; the most popular of the latter was "Old King Tut" by Harry Von Tilzer from 1923, which was recorded by such prominent artists of the time as Jones & Hare and Sophie Tucker. "King Tut" became the name of products, businesses, and the pet dog of U.S. President Herbert Hoover. While The Treasures of Tutankhamun exhibit was touring the United States in 1978, comedian Steve Martin wrote a novelty song "King Tut". Originally performed on Saturday Night Live, the song was released as a single and sold over a million copies. In 2023, an extinct whale discovered in the Eocene deposits of Egypt was named Tutcetus, after Tutankhamun, due to the small size and immature age of the type specimen.

=== International exhibitions ===
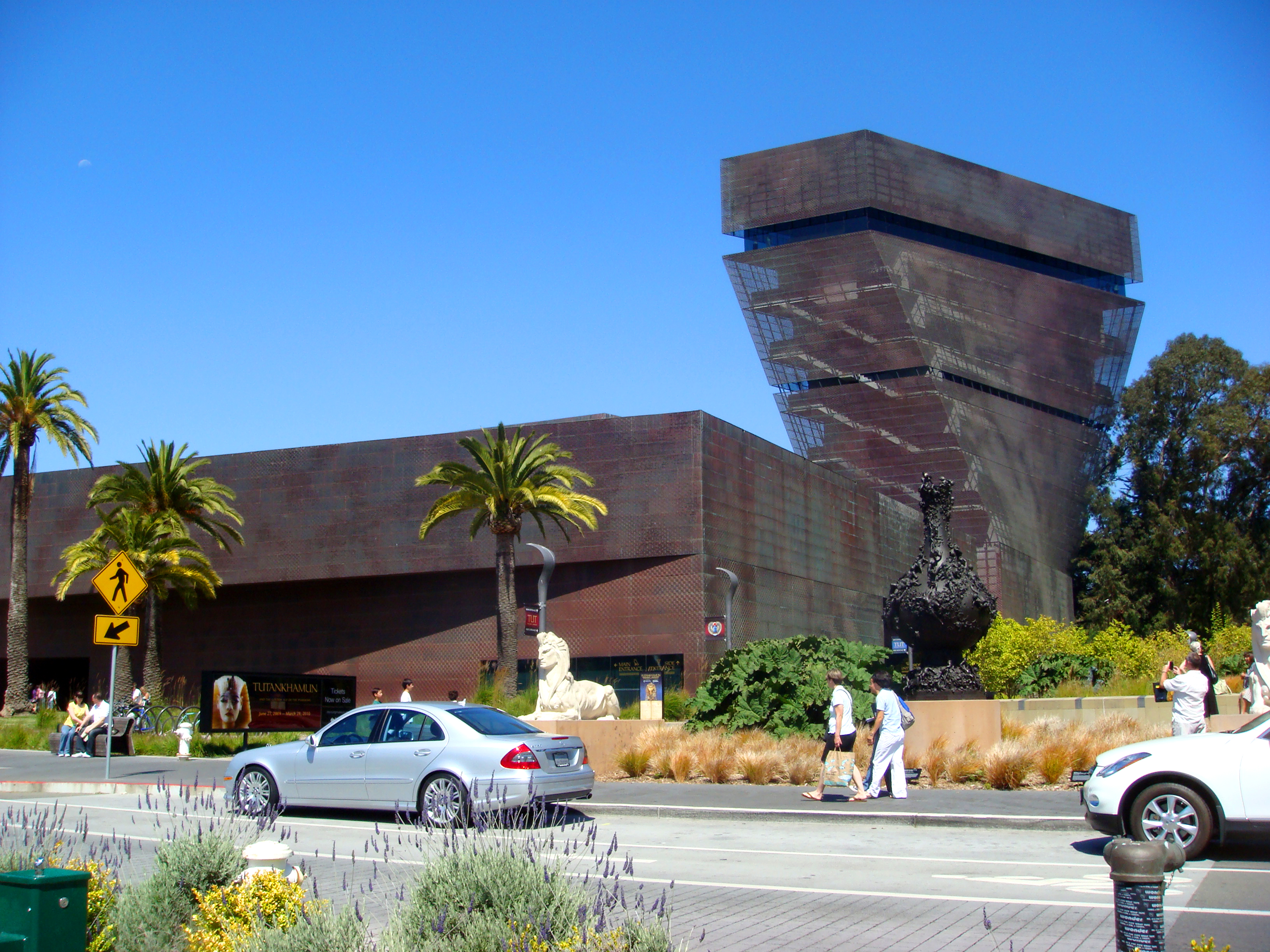
San Francisco's M. H. de Young Memorial Museum hosted an exhibition of Tutankhamun artifacts in 2009

Tutankhamun's artifacts have traveled the world with unprecedented visitorship. The exhibitions began in 1962 when Algeria won its independence from France. With the ending of that conflict, the Louvre Museum in Paris was quickly able to arrange an exhibition of Tutankhamun's treasures through Christiane Desroches Noblecourt. The French Egyptologist was already in Egypt as part of a UNESCO appointment. The French exhibit drew 1.2 million visitors. Noblecourt had also convinced the Egyptian Minister of Culture to allow British photographer George Rainbird to re-photograph the collection in color. The new color photos, as well as the Louvre exhibition, began a Tutankhamun revival.

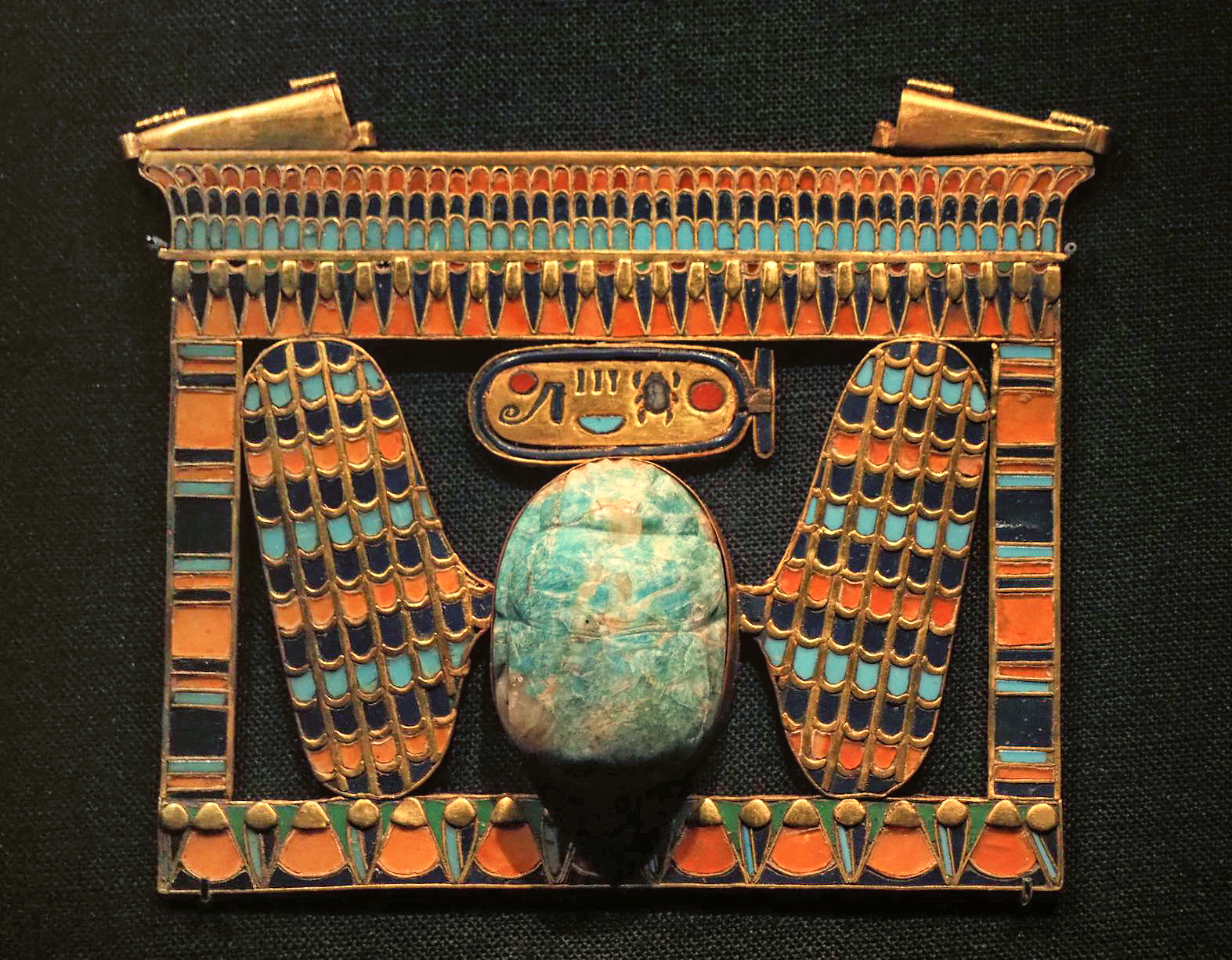
Pectoral of Tutankhamun

In 1965, the Tutankhamun exhibit traveled to Tokyo National Museum in Tokyo, Japan (21 August–10 October) where it garnered more visitors than the future New York exhibit in 1979. The exhibit next moved to the Kyoto Municipal Museum of Art in Kyoto (15 October–28 November) with almost 1.75 million visitors, and then to the Fukuoka Prefectural Cultural Hall in Fukuoka (3 December–26 December). The blockbuster attraction exceeded all other exhibitions of Tutankhamun's treasures for the next 60 years. The Treasures of Tutankhamun tour ran from 1972 to 1979. This exhibition was first shown in London at the British Museum from 30 March until 30 September 1972. More than 1.6 million visitors saw the exhibition. The exhibition moved on to many other countries, including the United States, Soviet Union, Japan, France, Canada, and West Germany. The Metropolitan Museum of Art organized the U.S. exhibition, which ran from 17 November 1976 through 15 April 1979. More than eight million attended. The showing in the United States was part of a diplomatic effort begun by Henry Kissinger to further convince Americans of the value of Egypt as an ally. It traveled first to Washington, D.C., then to Chicago, New Orleans, Los Angeles, and Seattle, and finished in New York.

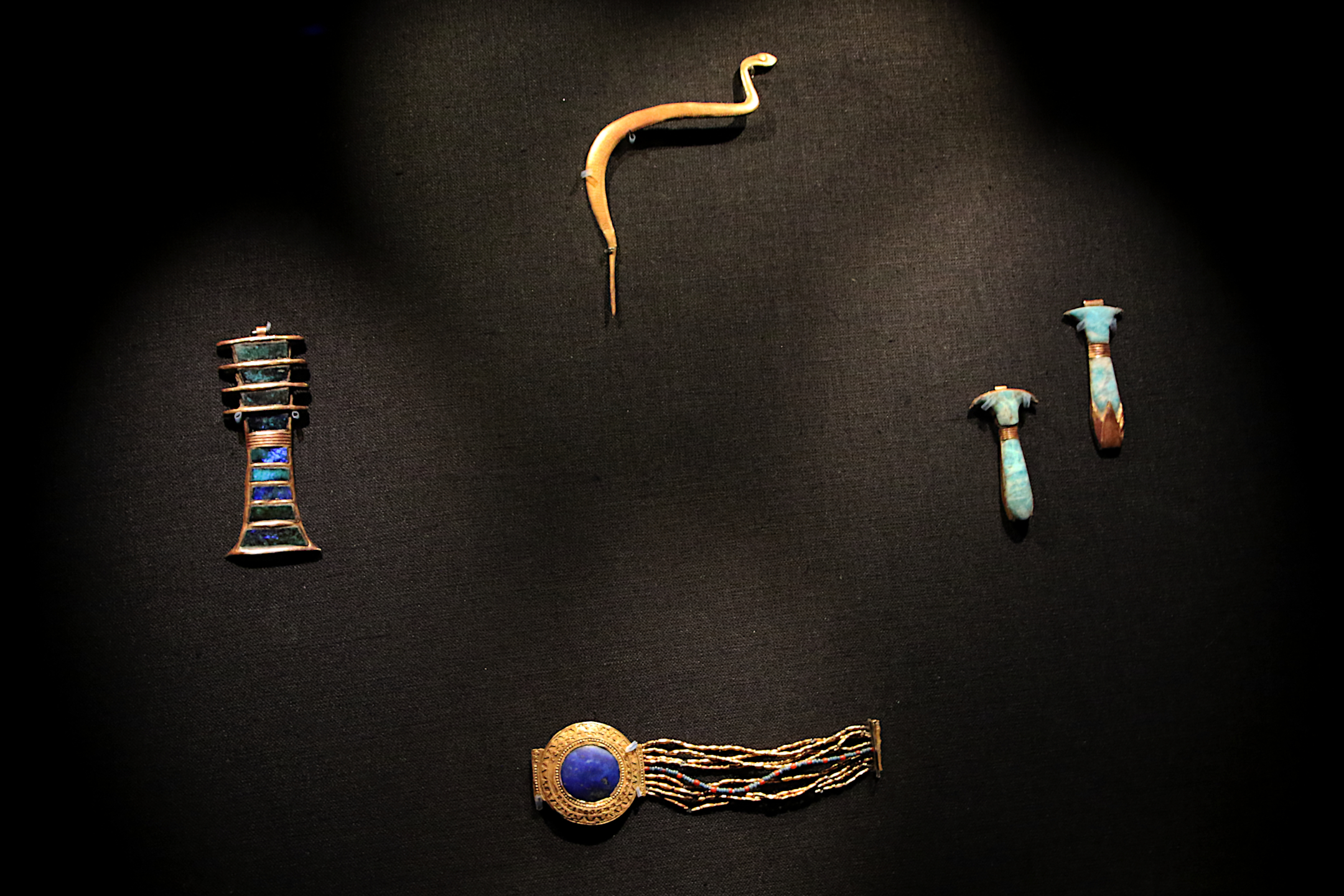
Amulets and Bracelets of Tutankhamun

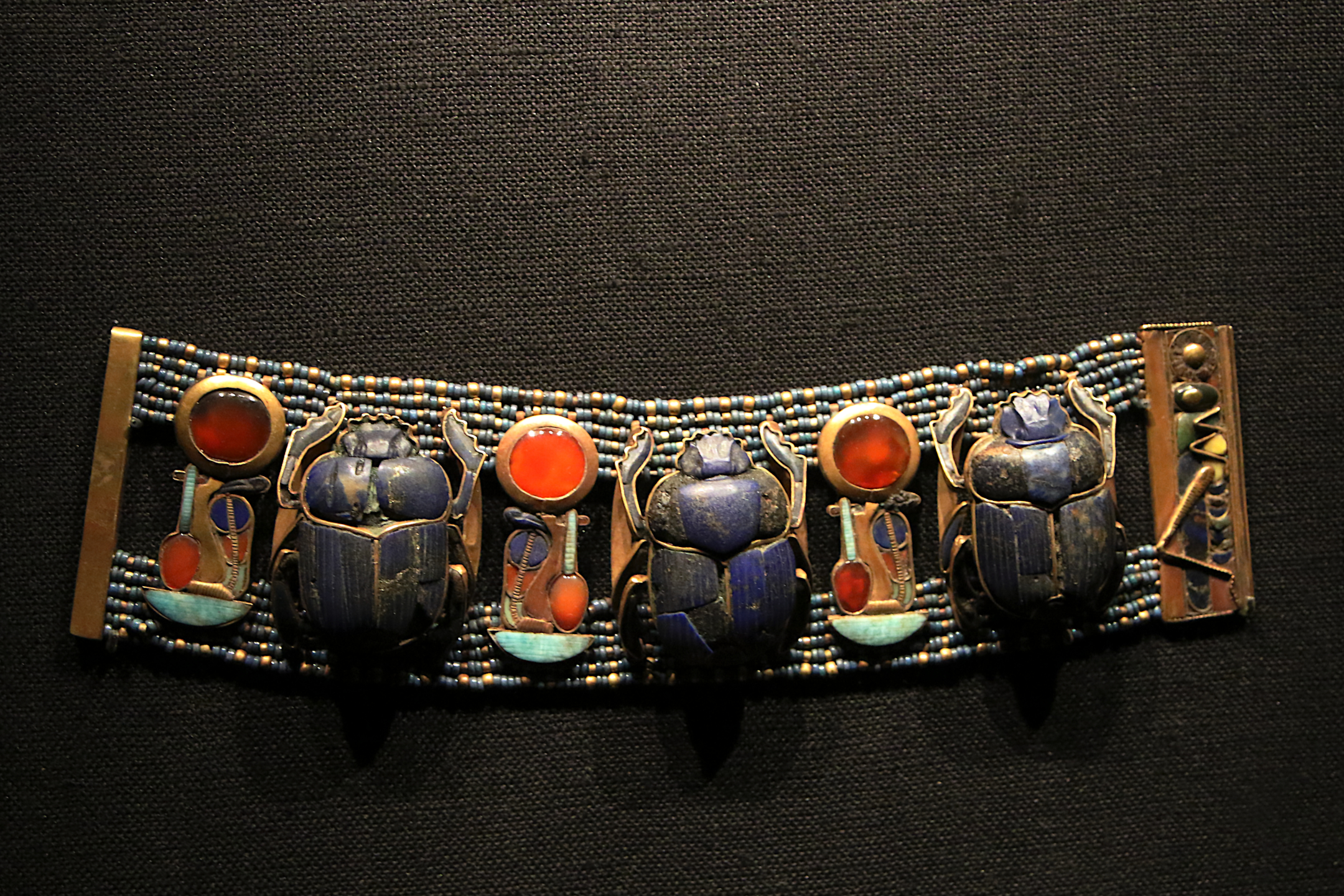
Bracelet of Tutankhamun

In 2005, Egypt's Supreme Council of Antiquities, in partnership with Arts and Exhibitions International and the National Geographic Society, launched a tour of Tutankhamun treasures and other 18th Dynasty funerary objects, this time called Tutankhamun and the Golden Age of the Pharaohs. It featured the same exhibits as Tutankhamen: The Golden Hereafter in a slightly different format. It was expected to draw more than three million people, but exceeded that with almost four million people attending just the first four tour stops. The exhibition started in Los Angeles, then moved to Fort Lauderdale, Chicago, Philadelphia and London before finally returning to Egypt in August 2008. An encore of the exhibition in the United States ran at the Dallas Museum of Art. After Dallas the exhibition moved to the de Young Museum in San Francisco, followed by the Discovery Times Square Exposition in New York City.

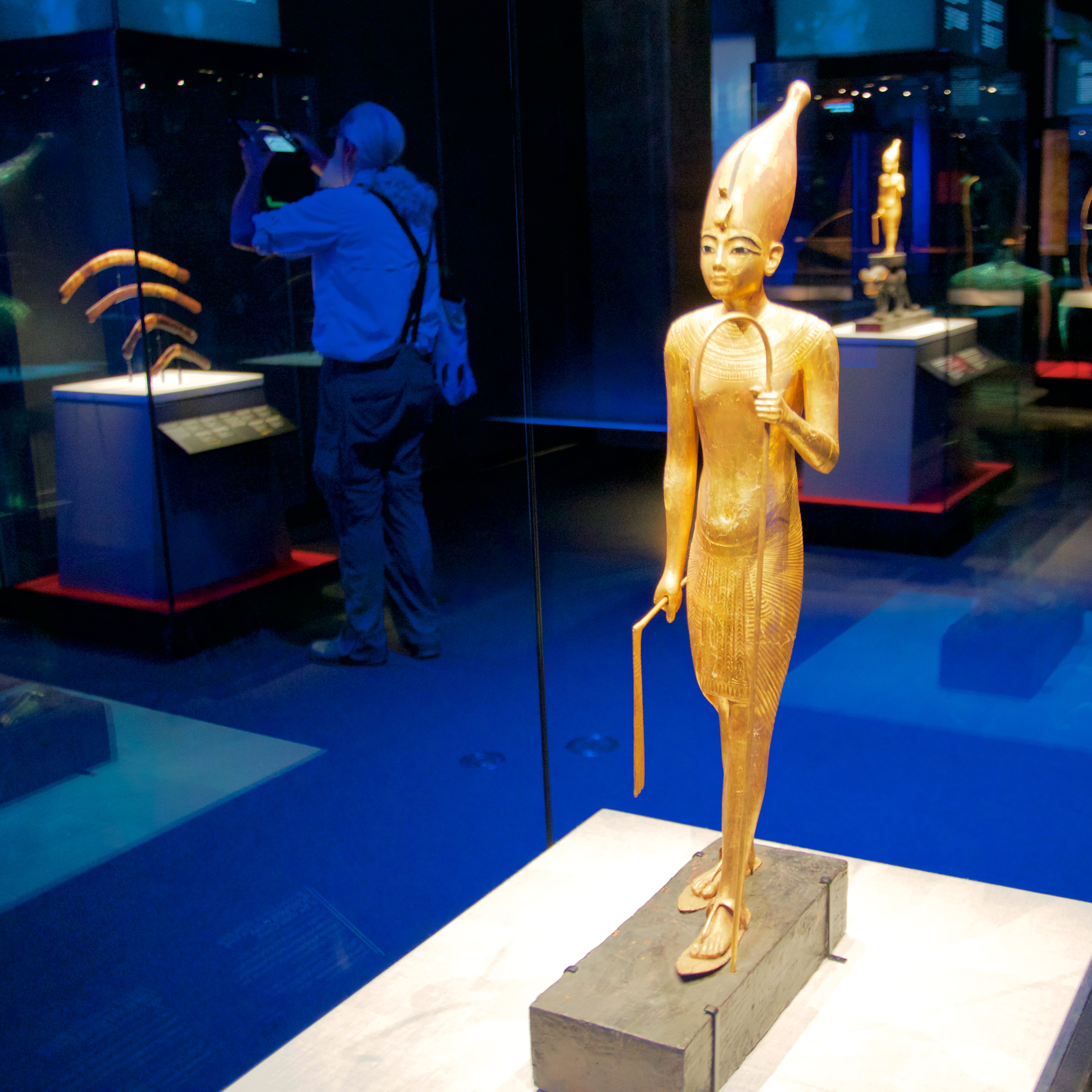
Tutankhamun exhibition in 2018

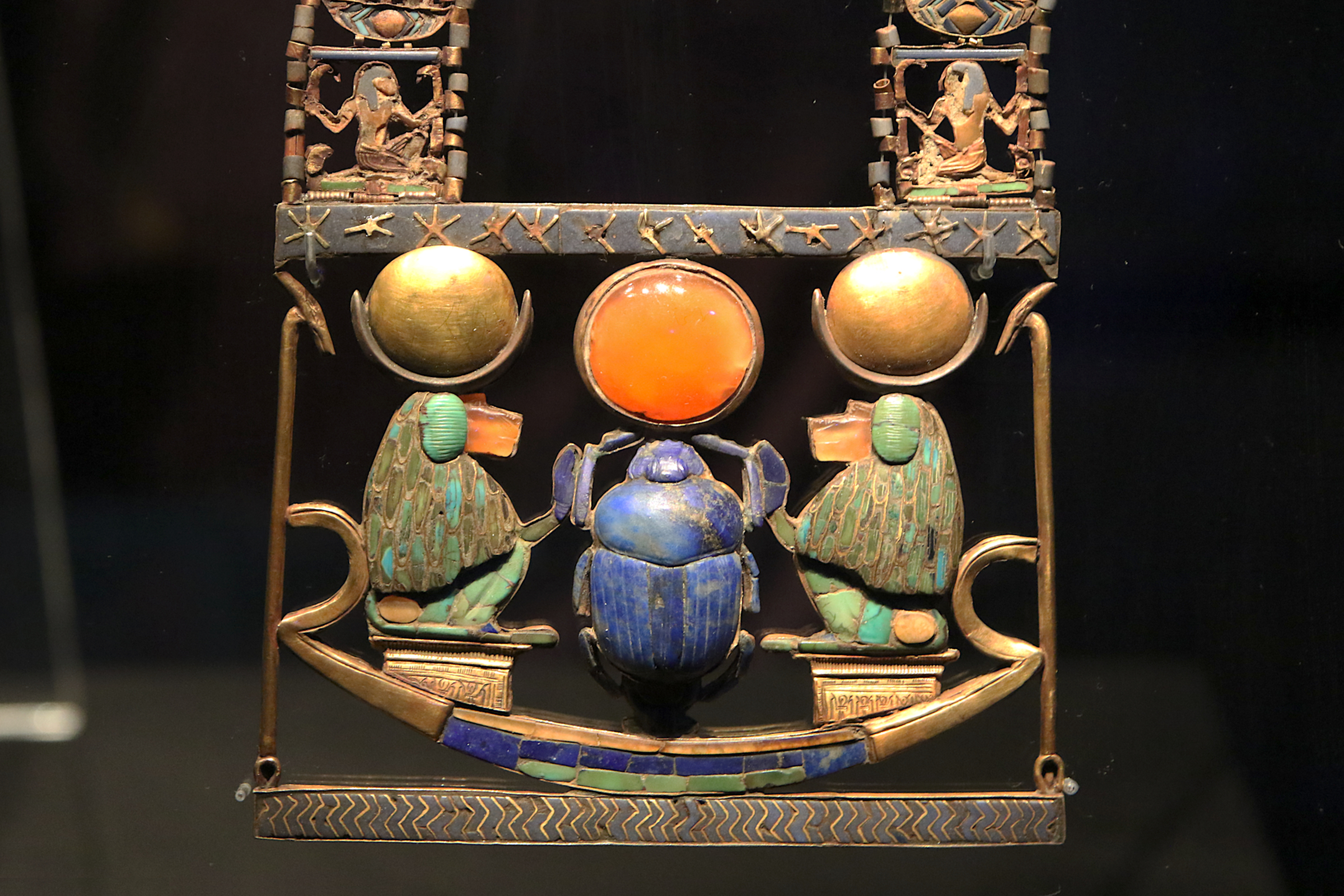
A solar barque scarab beetle pectoral from Tutankhamun's tomb

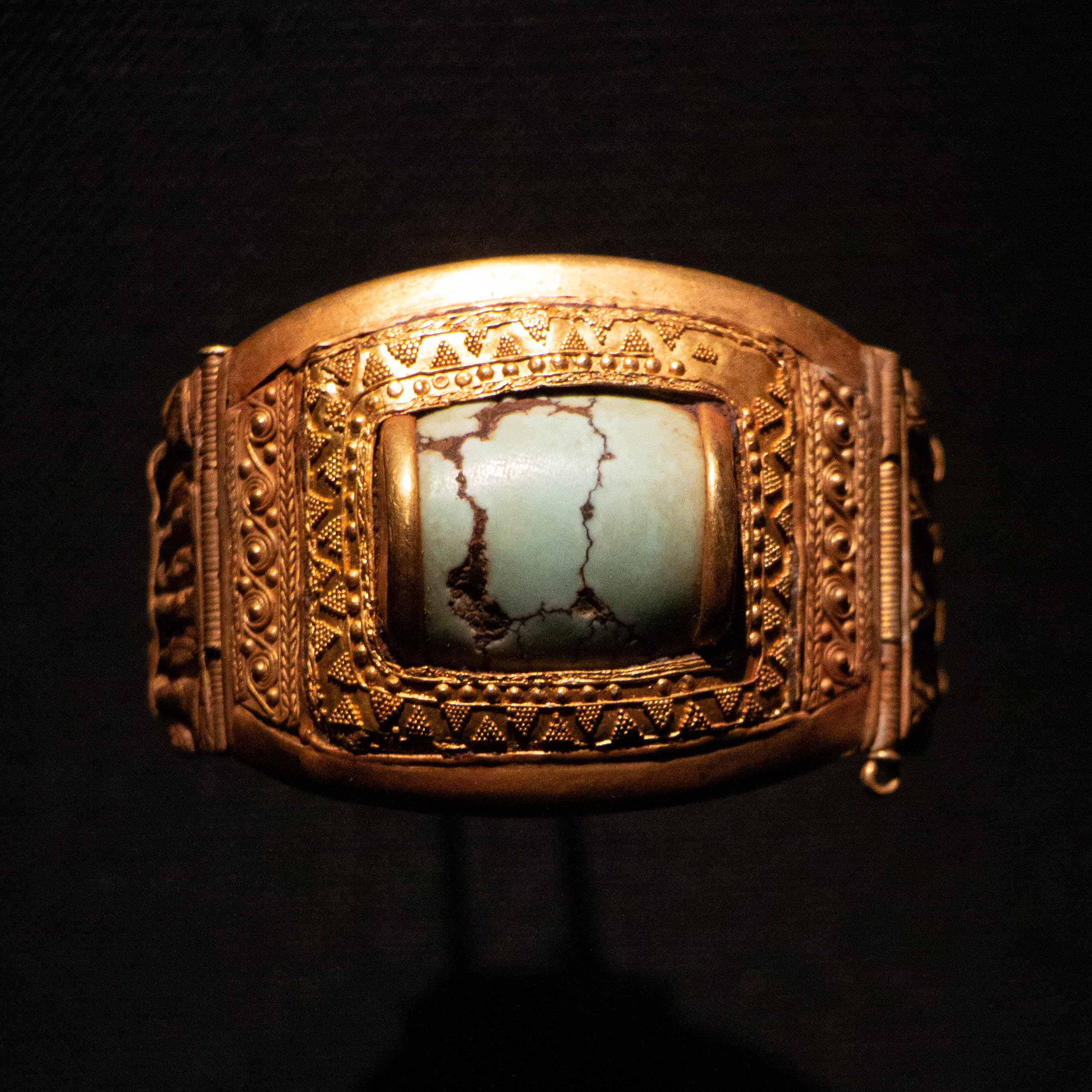
A gem stone bracelet found on Tutankhamun body

The exhibition visited Australia for the first time, opening at the Melbourne Museum for its only Australian stop before Egypt's treasures returned to Cairo in December 2011.

The exhibition included 80 exhibits from the reigns of Tutankhamun's immediate predecessors in the 18th Dynasty, such as Hatshepsut, whose trade policies greatly increased the wealth of that dynasty and enabled the lavish wealth of Tutankhamun's burial artifacts, as well as 50 from Tutankhamun's tomb. The exhibition did not include the gold mask that was a feature of the 1972–1979 tour, as the Egyptian government has decided that the damage that occurred to previous artifacts on tours precludes this one from joining them.

In 2018, it was announced that the largest collection of Tutankhamun artifacts, amounting to forty percent of the entire collection, would be leaving Egypt again in 2019 for an international tour entitled; "King Tut: Treasures of the Golden Pharaoh". The 2019–2022 tour began with an exhibit called; "Tutankhamun, Pharaoh's Treasures," which launched in Los Angeles and then traveled to Paris. The exhibit featured at the Grande Halle de la Villette in Paris ran from March to September 2019. The exhibit featured one hundred and fifty gold coins, along with various pieces of jewelry, sculpture, and carvings, as well as the gold mask of Tutankhamun. Promotion of the exhibit filled the streets of Paris with posters of the event. The exhibit moved to London in November 2019 and was scheduled to travel to Boston and Sydney when the COVID-19 pandemic interrupted the tour. On 28 August 2020 the artifacts that made up the temporary exhibition returned to the Egyptian Museum, Cairo, and other institutions. The treasures will be permanently housed in the new Grand Egyptian Museum in Cairo, expected to open between October 2023 and February 2024.

== Family tree ==
Reconstruction below works under assumption that KV55 body belongs to Akhenaten.

Tutankhamun ascending family history

Based on genetic testing and archeological evidence

Thutmose IV ♂	Mutemwiya ♀	Tjuyu ♀ (Note: Cooney - Jasno - pp. 219 - 220 "DNA indicated a probability in excess of 99.99%" that Amenhotep III was the father of the man interred in KV55. The probability that the man interred in KV55 is the father of Tutankhamun was equally as great." "[T]he lock of hair found in Tutankhamun's tomb seemed to link him in some intimate way to KV35EL". "Tiye's parents, Yuya and Thuya, had been found.." "..genetic analysis confirmed KV35EL as their daughter." "Furthermore, and as anticipated, the KV55 mummy genetically matched as the offspring of KV35EL." "Perhaps the most curious results of the genetic fingerprinting came from KV35YL. She proved to be not only a daughter of Amenhotep III and Tiye but also the mother of Tutankhamun.")	Yuya ♂
Amenhotep III ♂	Tiye ♀ Body identified as KV35EL
Nefertiti ♀	Akhenaten ♂_{Body identified in KV55}	The Younger Lady ♀_{Body identified as KV35YL} _{Possibly Nebetah or Beketaten}
Ankhesenamun ♀ Body believed to be KV21A	Tutankhamun ♂
Daughter 1 ♀	Daughter 2 ♀

Explanatory notes and reference sources

== See also ==
- List of child saints
- Anubis Shrine – Part of the burial equipment of the Egyptian pharaoh Tutankhamun
- Tutankhamun's meteoric iron dagger – Ancient Egyptian tomb artifact
- Tutankhamun's trumpets – Pair of the oldest operational trumpets
- Fu Hao – Shang dynasty general, diviner, Queen consort to King Wu Ding
- Tomb of Fu Hao – Shang Dynasty royal tomb
- King Tut (comics) – Batman supervillain
- Reformation – 16th-century movement in Western Christianity
- Counter-Reformation – Catholic response to the Protestant Reformation
