= Tutankhamun's meteoric iron dagger =

Ancient Egyptian tomb artifact

- Material: Iron
- Created: c. 1330 BC
- Discovered: 1925; Luxor, Luxor Governorate, Egypt
- Present location: Cairo, Cairo Governorate, Egypt

Tutankhamun's meteoric iron dagger, also known as Tutankhamun's iron dagger and King Tut's dagger, is an iron-bladed dagger from the tomb of the ancient Egyptian Pharaoh Tutankhamun (reigned c. 1334–1325 BC). The iron material for the blade is believed to have originated from a meteorite due to its chemical composition. The dagger is currently displayed at the Grand Egyptian Museum in Cairo.

== Background ==
At the time of King Tutankhamun's mummification in approximately 1323 BC (the Bronze Age), iron smelting and manufacture were rare. Iron objects were used for only artistic, ornamental, ritual, gift giving and ceremonial purposes as well as for pigmentation. Iron artifacts were given as royal gifts during the period directly preceding Tutankhamun's rule (i.e., during the reign of Amenhotep III).

Nineteen iron objects were discovered in the tomb of Tutankhamun, including a set of blades which appear very similar to those used in the Egyptian opening of the mouth ceremony (a ritual performed for the benefit of the deceased to enable an afterlife). These blades are also intricately linked to iron and stars, being described in temple inventories as composed of iron and were themselves frequently referred to as the stars.

Other iron objects were wrapped with Tutankhamun's mummy; these include a miniature headrest contained inside the golden death mask, an amulet attached to a golden bracelet and a dagger blade with gold haft.

== Meteorite source ==
Since the 1960s, the high nickel content in the blade has been accepted as indicative of meteoric origin. A more recent study published in June 2016 derived from x-ray fluorescence spectrometer analysis shows that the blade's composition is mostly iron (Fe) and 11% nickel (Ni) and 0.6% cobalt (Co), consistent with the composition of known iron meteorites.

Evidence of iron smelting in Egypt begins in the 6th century BC, but the earliest known use of metallic iron is almost three millennia earlier, from a Naqada II burial c. 3400 BC. A 2013 study determined that the iron from that find was also of meteorite origin.

== See also ==
- Meteoric iron
