= Polymetatarsia =

- Other names: Duplication of metatarsal.
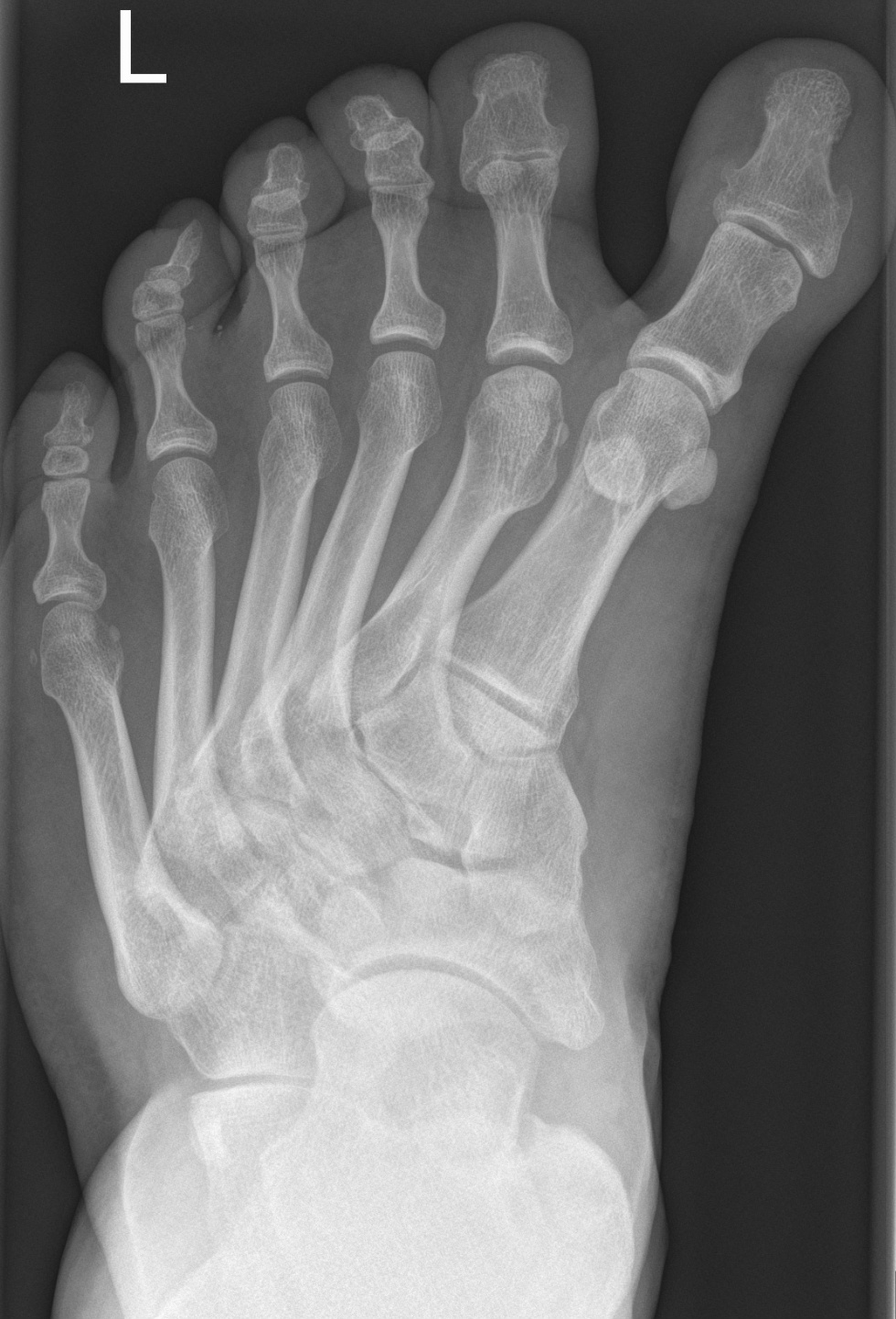
- Polydactyly-associated polymetatarsia.
- Specialty: Medical genetics
- Usual onset: Congenital
- Duration: Life-long, but can be corrected with surgery
- Causes: Genetic mutation
- Prevention: None
- Prognosis: Good
- Frequency: Uncommon (with polydactyly), very rare (without polydactyly)
- Deaths: -

Polymetatarsia is a rare congenital malformation which is characterized by the presence of 6 or more metatarsal bones in the same foot. It is most commonly seen alongside polydactyly, and it often appears between the fourth and fifth metatarsals or beside the fifth metatarsal.

Few cases of polymetatarsia not associated with polydactyly have been reported.
