= Hypophalangism =

Hypophalangism is a congenital absence of one or more phalanges (bones of the fingers and toes).
