= Akhenaten =

Eighteenth Dynasty Egyptian pharaoh

Akhenaten; Amenhotep IV
- Amenophis IV, Naphurureya, Ikhnaton
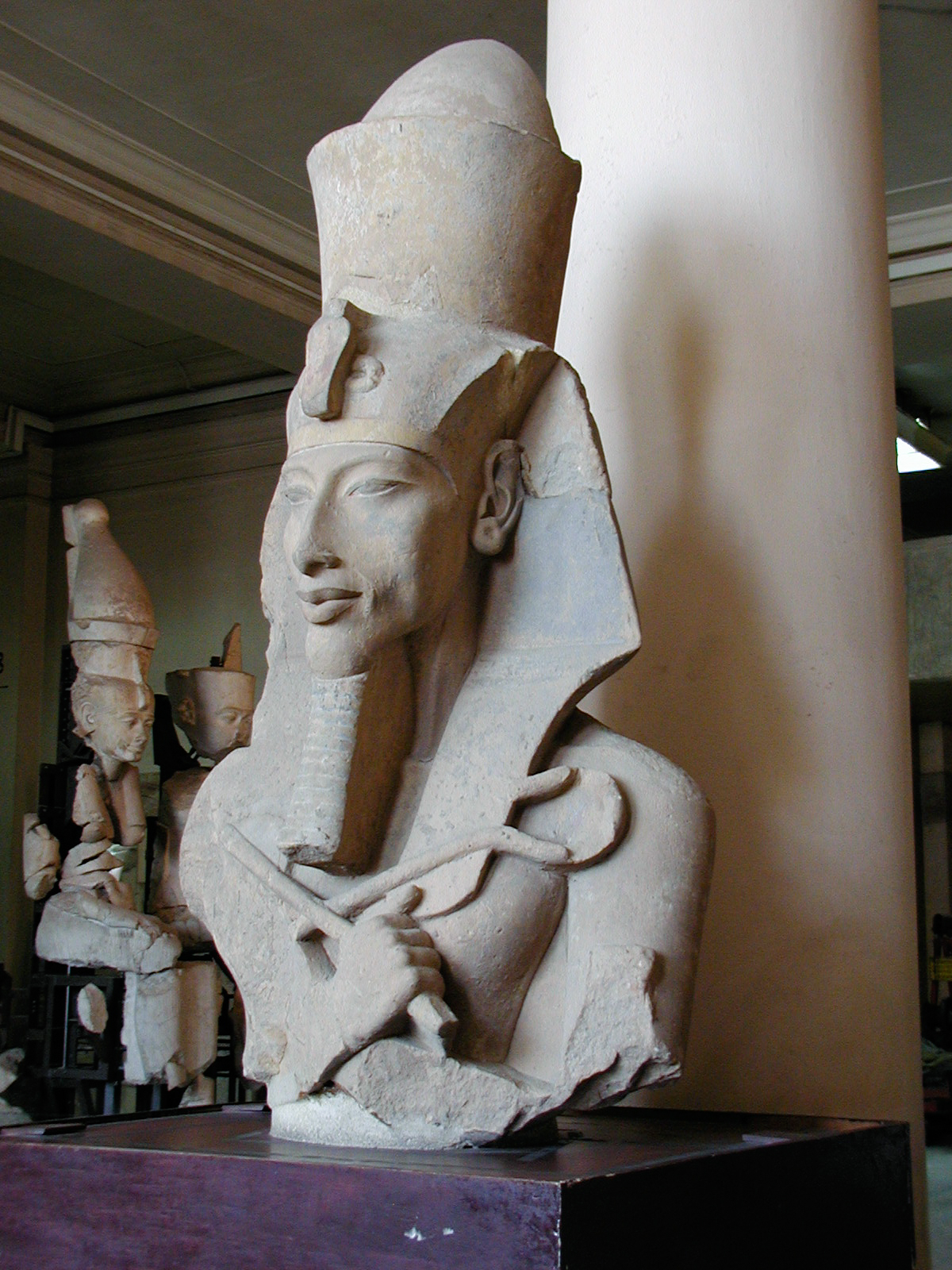
- Statue of Akhenaten at the Egyptian Museum

Pharaoh
- Reign: 1353–1336 BC or; 1351–1334 BC
- Predecessor: Amenhotep III
- Successor: Uncertain: Neferneferuaten (most likely); Smenkhkare or Tutankhamun
Royal titulary
Horus name
Ka nakht qai shuti (Year 1–5)
Victorious bull, high of plumes
G5	E1 D40 q A28 S9
Mery Iten (after Year 5)
Beloved of the Aten
G5	i t n ra N36
Nebty name
Wer nesyt em Ipet Swt (Year 1–5)
Great of kingship in Karnak
G16	wr r sw t n i i m i t p Q1 t Z2
Wer-nesut-em-Akhetaten (after Year 5)
Great of kingship in Akhetaten
G16	wr r sw t i i Aa13 Axt t pr i t n ra
Golden Horus
Wetjes khau em Iunu shemay (Year 1–5)
Elevated of appearances in southern Heliopolis
G8	U39 Y1 N28 Z2 m O28 W24 O49 M27
Wetjes ren en Iten (after Year 5)
Who has elevated the name of the Aten
G8	U39 r n V10 n i t n ra
Prenomen
Nefer-kheperu-Re, wa-en-Re (Year 1–17)
The perfect one of the manifestations of Re, the unique one of Re

M23 X1 L2 X1	ra nfr xpr Z3 ra wa n
Nomen
Imen-hetep(u) netjer heqa Waset (Year 1–5)
Amun is satisfied, god, and ruler of Thebes

G39 N5	i mn n Htp nTrw S38 R19
Akh-en-Iten (after Year 5)
The one who is beneficial to the Aten

G39 N5	i t n ra G25 x n
- Consorts: Nefertiti; Kiya; The Younger Lady (possibly)
- Children: Known: Meritaten; Meketaten; Ankhesenamun; Neferneferuaten Tasherit; Neferneferure; Setepenre; Possible: Smenkhkare; Tutankhamun; Ankhesenpaaten Tasherit; Meritaten Tasherit
- Father: Amenhotep III
- Mother: Tiye
- Died: 1336 BC or 1334 BC (aged c. 38)
- Burial: Royal Tomb of Akhenaten, Amarna (original tomb); KV55 (disputed)
- Monuments: Akhetaten, Gempaaten
- Dynasty: 18th Dynasty of Egypt
- Religion: Ancient Egyptian religion; Atenism

Akhenaten (pronounced /ˌækəˈnɑːtən/), also spelled Akhenaton, Echnaton, and Khuenaten (Ancient Egyptian: ꜣḫ-n-jtn ʾŪḫə-nə-yātəy, pronounced [ˈʔuːχəʔ nə ˈjaːtəj], meaning 'Effective for the Aten'; c. 1373 BC - c. 1335 BC), was an ancient Egyptian pharaoh reigning c. 1353–1336 or 1351–1334 BC, the 10th ruler of the 18th Dynasty. Originally named Amenhotep IV (Ancient Egyptian: jmn-ḥtp, meaning "Amun is satisfied", Hellenized as Amenophis IV), in the fifth year of his reign he changed his name to "Akhenaten".

As pharaoh, Akhenaten is noted for:

- Abandoning the traditional, polytheistic ancient Egyptian religion, and introducing Atenism, or worship centered around Aten. The views of Egyptologists differ as to whether the religious policy was absolutely monotheistic, or whether it was monolatristic, syncretistic, or henotheistic.
- Moving the royal capital out of Thebes and into a new city that he founded as Akhetaten, known today as Amarna.
- Began a new period in Egyptian political history, known as the Amarna Period.

This culture shift away from traditional religion was reversed after his death. Akhenaten's monuments were dismantled and hidden, his statues were destroyed, and his name excluded from lists of rulers compiled by later pharaohs. Traditional religious practice was gradually restored, notably under his close successor Tutankhamun, who changed his name from Tutankhaten early in his reign. When, some dozen years later, rulers without clear rights of succession from the Eighteenth Dynasty founded a new dynasty, they discredited Akhenaten and his immediate successors and referred to him as "the enemy of Akhetaten", "the enemy" or "that criminal" in archival records.

Akhenaten was all but lost to history until the late 19th-century discovery of Amarna, or Akhetaten, the new capital city he built for the worship of Aten. Furthermore, in 1907 a mummy that could be Akhenaten's was unearthed from the tomb KV55 in the Valley of the Kings by Edward Ayrton. Genetic testing has determined that the man buried in KV55 was Tutankhamun's father, but its identification as Akhenaten has since been questioned.

Akhenaten's rediscovery and Flinders Petrie's early excavations at Amarna sparked great public interest in the pharaoh and his queen Nefertiti. He has been described as "enigmatic", "mysterious", "revolutionary", "the greatest idealist of the world", and "the first individual in history", but also as a "heretic", "fanatic", "possibly insane", and "mad". Public and scholarly fascination with Akhenaten comes from his connection with Tutankhamun, the unique style and high quality of the pictorial arts he patronized, and the religion he attempted to establish, foreshadowing monotheism.

== Family ==
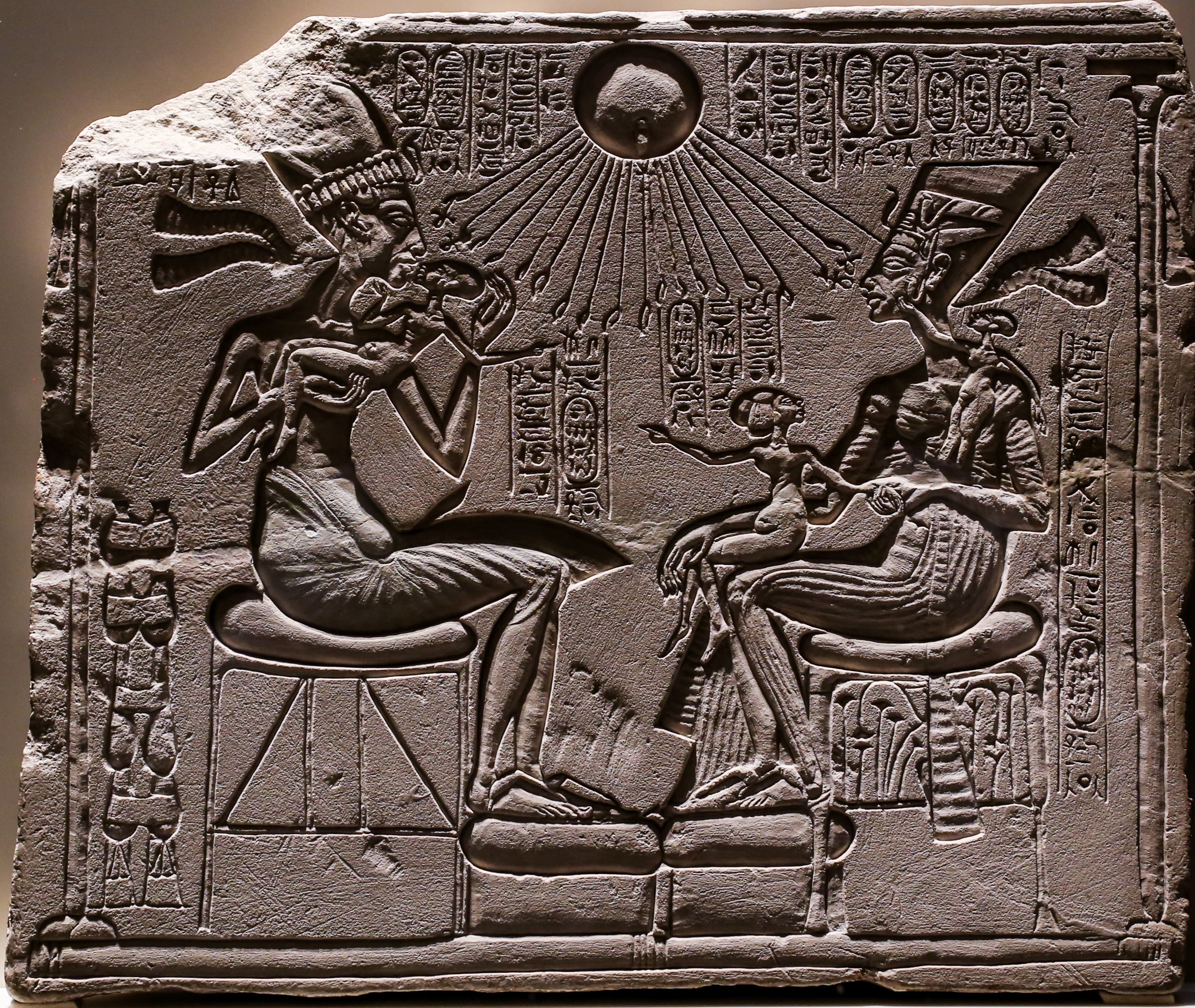
Akhenaten, Nefertiti, and their children

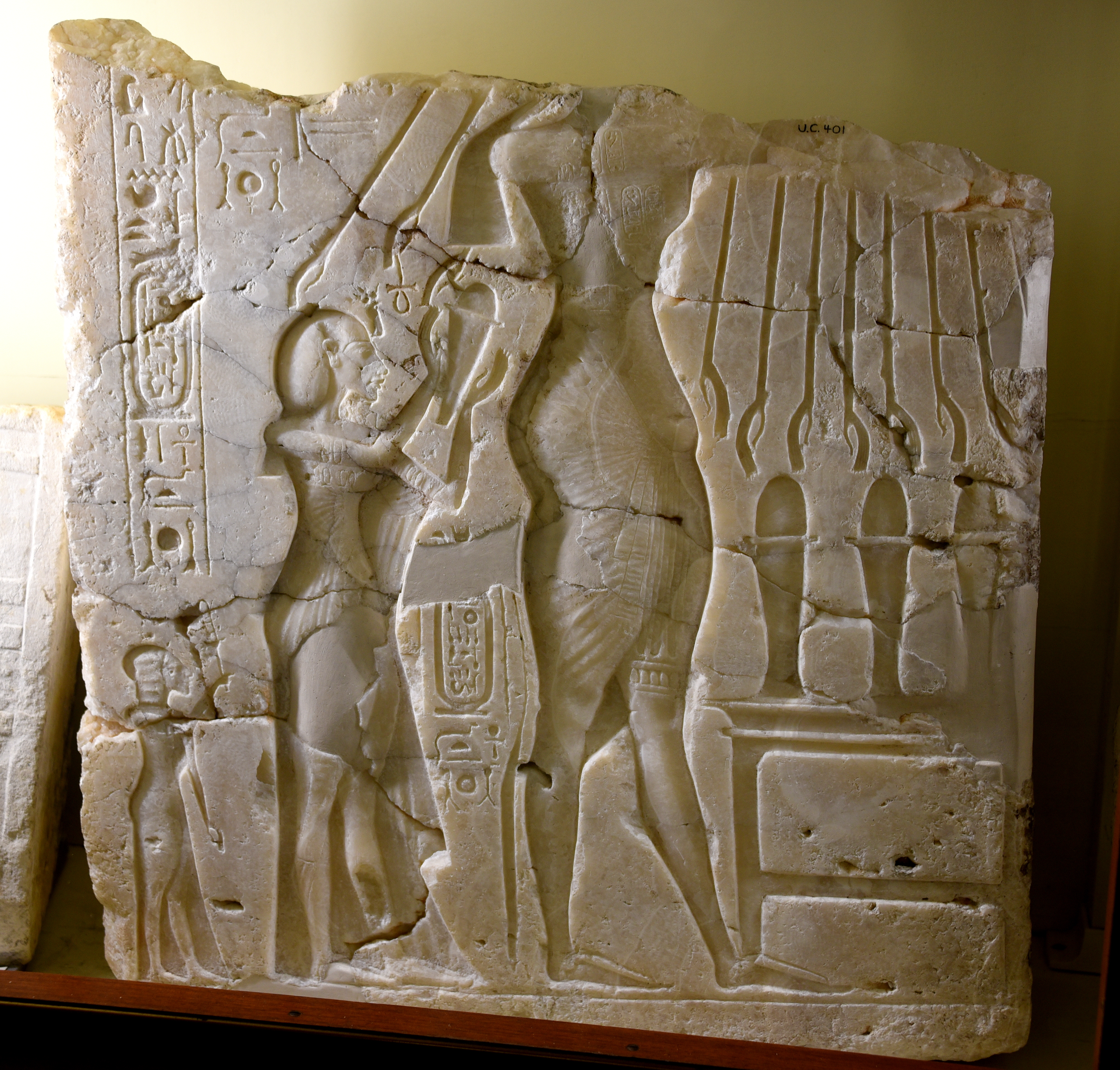
Alabaster sunken relief depicting Akhenaten (head lost), Nefertiti, and daughter Meritaten. Early Aten cartouches on king's arm and chest. From Amarna, Egypt. 18th Dynasty. The Petrie Museum of Egyptian Archaeology, London. With thanks to the Petrie Museum of Egyptian Archaeology, UCL.

The future Akhenaten was born Amenhotep IV, a younger son of pharaoh Amenhotep III and his principal wife, Tiye. Akhenaten had an elder brother, crown prince Thutmose, who was recognized as Amenhotep III's heir. Akhenaten also had four or five sisters: Sitamun, Henuttaneb, Iset, Nebetah, and possibly Beketaten. Thutmose's early death, perhaps around Amenhotep III's 30th regnal year, meant that Akhenaten was next in line for Egypt's throne.

Akhenaten was married to Nefertiti, his Great Royal Wife. The exact timing of their marriage is unknown, but inscriptions from the pharaoh's building projects suggest that they married either shortly before or after Akhenaten took the throne. For example, Egyptologist Dimitri Laboury suggests that the marriage took place in Akhenaten's fourth regnal year. A secondary wife of Akhenaten named Kiya is also known from inscriptions. Some Egyptologists theorize that she gained her importance as the mother of Tutankhamun. William Murnane proposes that Kiya is the colloquial name of the Mitanni princess Tadukhipa, daughter of the Mitanni king Tushratta, who had married Amenhotep III before becoming the wife of Akhenaten. Akhenaten's other attested consorts are the daughter of the Enišasi ruler Šatiya and another daughter of the Babylonian king Burna-Buriash II.

Akhenaten had seven attested daughters. Six of them were born by Nefertiti:

- Meritaten (c. 1350 - c. 1330 BC): Great Royal Wife of Pharaoh Smenkhkare, born in regnal Year 1 or 5
- Meketaten (c. 1349 - c. 1339 BC)
- Ankhesenamun (c. 1348 - c. 1320 BC): Great Royal Wife of Pharaoh Tutankhamun, born before Year 8
- Neferneferuaten Tasherit (born c. 1344 BC): Born in or before Year 9
- Neferneferure (c. 1343 - c. 1340 BC): Born in Year 9 or 10
- Setepenre (c. 1343 - c. 1340 BC): Born in Year 10 or 11

Another daughter, whose name is lost, was born by Kiya, before Year 13.

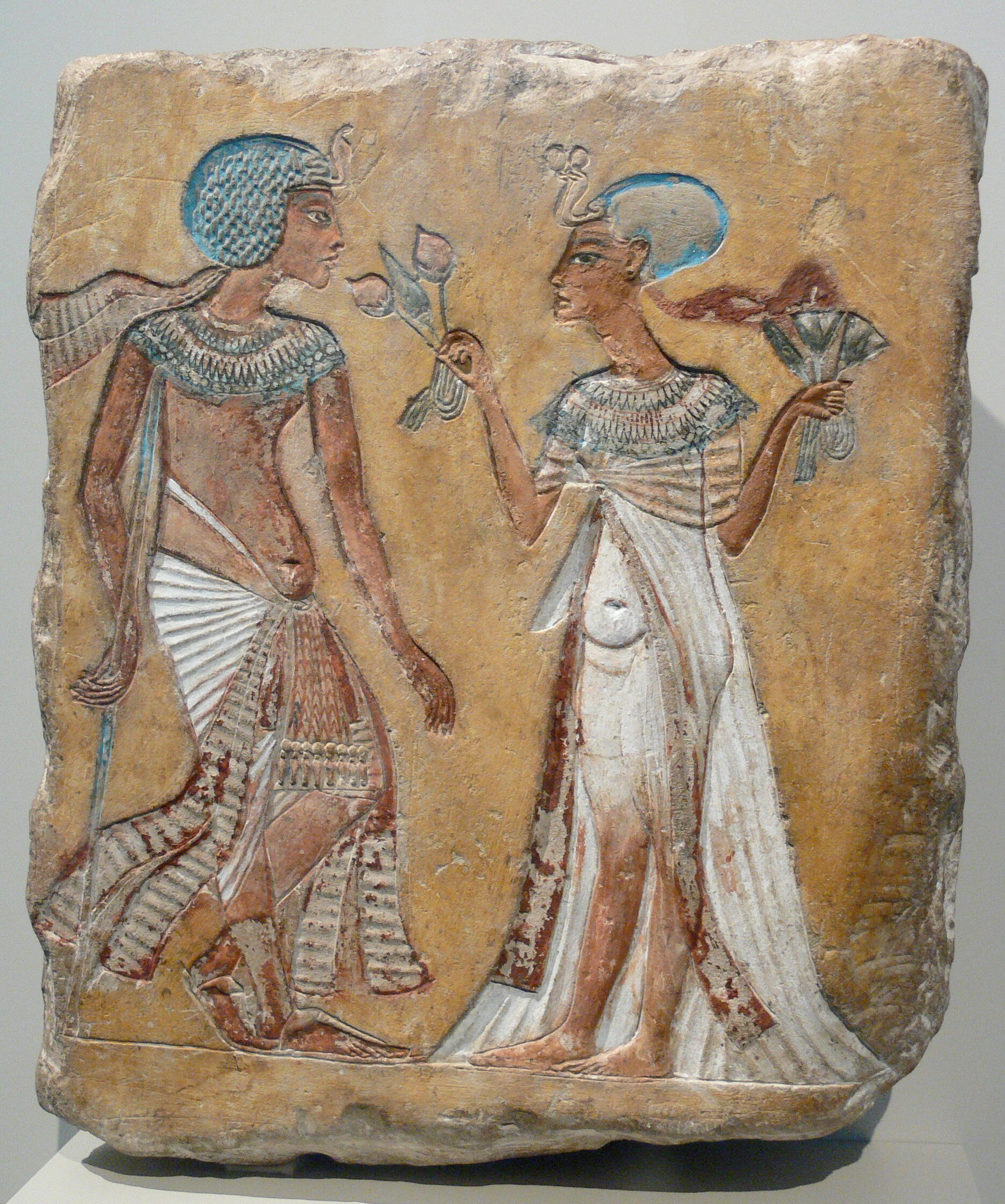
This limestone relief of a royal couple in the Amarna style has variously been attributed as Akhenaten and Nefertiti, Smenkhkare and Meritaten, or Tutankhamun and Ankhesenamun

Pharaoh Tutankhamun, born Tutankhaten, was Akheaten's son-in-law and is considered likely to be also his biological son, either with Nefertiti or another wife. Genetic testing, performed in years 2007-2009 by Zahi Hawass's team, suggests that Tutankhamun's parents were a male individual buried in KV55, and a woman whose mummy is nicknamed "The Younger Lady". They were identified most likely to be son of Amenhotep III and Tiye (which would fit for Akhenaten) and his full sister.

However, the absence of evidence of Akhenaten ever marrying any of his sisters, caused doubt regarding veracity of genetic testing due to possible contamination of ancient DNA or incorrect reading of genetic kinship between potentially inbred members of the royal family. Several alternative interpretations of the data have been proposed: Kara Cooney suggests that Akhenaten fathered Tutankhamun by one of his daughters, Meritaten or Meketaten, "making him [Tutankhamun] a product of father-daughter incest and thus fitting the [inbreeding] DNA evidence of his body", while Juan Belmonte argues that KV55 mummy should instead be identified as another son of Amenhotep III, possibly Smenkhkare (Akhenaten's coregent or successor), which would make Tutankhamun a nephew of Akhenaten instead of his son. Joyce Tyldesley ignores the results altogether, considering them unreliable, and proposes Akhenaten fathered Tutankhamun by Kiya, while KV55 male should be identified as Smenkhkare, but not as son of Amenhotep III and Tiye, but their grandson, and Tutankhamun's half-brother (a son of Akhenaten by Nefertiti in this reconstruction).

Smenkhkare, who was married to Meritaten, might have been Akhenaten's brother or son by unknown wife, though it is suggested by some researchers that this individual could be identical with female pharaoh Neferneferuaten, believed to be Nefertiti.

Some historians, such as Edward Wente and James Allen, have proposed that Akhenaten took some of his daughters as wives or sexual consorts to father a male heir. While this is debated, some historical parallels exist: Akhenaten's father Amenhotep III married his daughter Sitamun, while Ramesses II married two or more of his daughters, even though their marriages might simply have been ceremonial. In Akhenaten's case, his oldest daughter Meritaten is recorded as Great Royal Wife to Smenkhkare but is also listed on a box from Tutankhamun's tomb alongside pharaohs Akhenaten and Neferneferuaten as Great Royal Wife. Additionally, letters written to Akhenaten from foreign rulers make reference to Meritaten as "mistress of the house". Egyptologists in the early 20th century also believed that Akhenaten could have fathered a child with his second oldest daughter Meketaten. Meketaten's death, at perhaps age ten to twelve, is recorded in the royal tombs at Akhetaten from around regnal years thirteen or fourteen. Early Egyptologists attribute her death to childbirth, because of the depiction of an infant in her tomb. Because no husband is known for Meketaten, the assumption had been that Akhenaten was the father. Aidan Dodson believes this to be unlikely, as no Egyptian tomb has been found that mentions or alludes to the cause of death of the tomb owner. Further, Jacobus van Dijk proposes that the child is a portrayal of Meketaten's soul. Finally, various monuments, originally for Kiya, were reinscribed for Akhenaten's daughters Meritaten and Ankhesenpaaten. The revised inscriptions list a Meritaten-tasherit ("junior") and an Ankhesenpaaten-tasherit. According to some, this indicates that Akhenaten fathered his own grandchildren. Others hold that, since these grandchildren are not attested to elsewhere, they are fictions invented to fill the space originally portraying Kiya's child.

== Early life ==
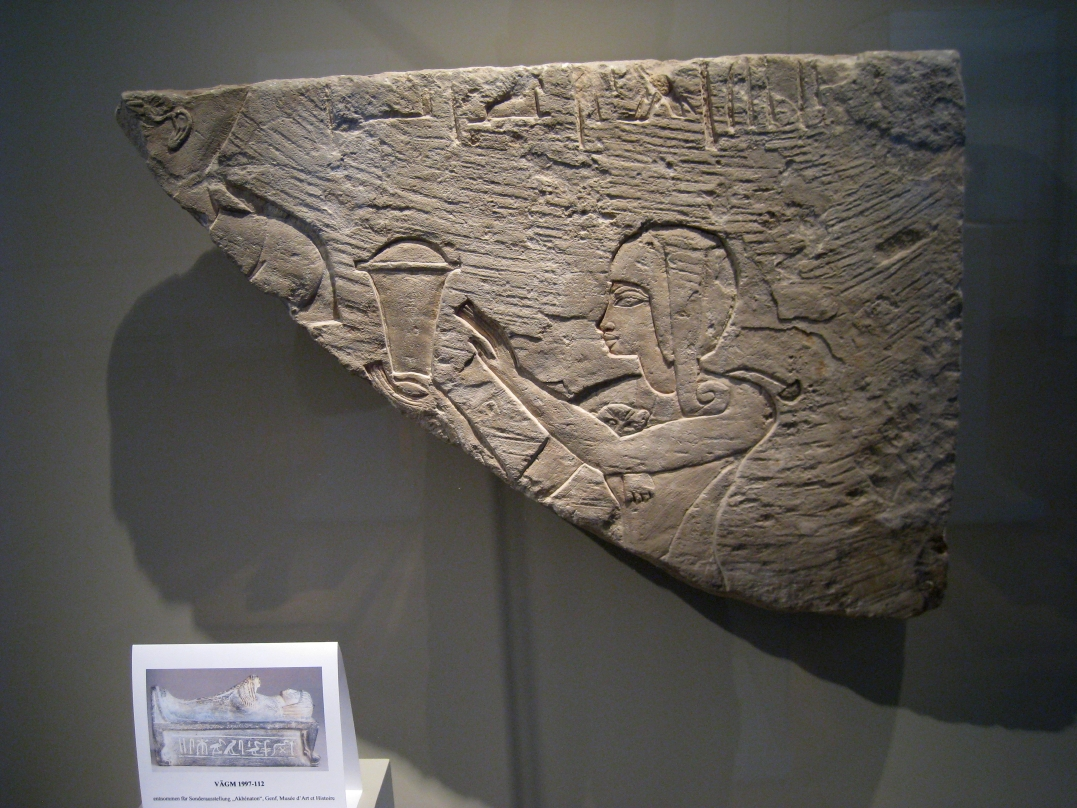
Akhenaten's elder brother Thutmose, shown in his role as High Priest of Ptah. Akhenaten became heir to the throne after Thutmose died during their father's reign.

Egyptologists know very little about Akhenaten's life as prince Amenhotep IV. Donald Redford dates his birth before his father Amenhotep III's 25th regnal year, c. 1363–1361 BC, based on the birth of Akhenaten's first daughter, who was likely born fairly early in his own reign. The only mention of his name, as "the King's Son Amenhotep", was found on a wine docket at Amenhotep III's Malkata palace, where some historians suggested Akhenaten was born. Others contend that he was born in Memphis, where growing up he was influenced by the worship of the sun god Ra practiced at nearby Heliopolis. Redford and James Hoffmeier state, however, that Ra's cult was so widespread and established throughout Egypt that Akhenaten could have been influenced by solar worship even if he did not grow up around Heliopolis.

Some historians have tried to determine who was Akhenaten's tutor during his youth, and have proposed scribes Heqareshu or Meryre II, the royal tutor Amenemotep, or the vizier Aperel. The only person who we know for certain served the prince was Parennefer, whose tomb mentions this fact.

Egyptologist Cyril Aldred suggests that prince Amenhotep IV might have been a High Priest of Ptah in Memphis, although no evidence supporting this had been found. It is known that Amenhotep IV's brother Thutmose served in this role before he died. If Amenhotep IV inherited all his brother's roles in preparation for his accession to the throne, he might have become a high priest in Thutmose's stead. Aldred proposes that Akhenaten's unusual artistic inclinations might have been formed during his time serving Ptah, the patron god of craftsmen, whose high priests were sometimes referred to as "The Greatest of the Directors of Craftsmanship".

== Reign ==
=== Coregency with Amenhotep III ===
There is much controversy around whether Amenhotep IV ascended to Egypt's throne on the death of his father Amenhotep III or whether there was a coregency, lasting perhaps as long as 12 years. Eric Cline, Nicholas Reeves, Peter Dorman, and other scholars argue strongly against the establishment of a long coregency between the two rulers and in favor of either no coregency or one lasting at most two years. Donald Redford, William Murnane, Alan Gardiner, and Lawrence Berman contest the view of any coregency whatsoever between Akhenaten and his father.

In 2014, archaeologists found both pharaohs' names inscribed on the wall of the Luxor tomb of vizier Amenhotep-Huy. The Egyptian Ministry of Antiquities called this "conclusive evidence" that Akhenaten shared power with his father for at least eight years, based on the dating of the tomb. However, this conclusion has since been called into question by other Egyptologists, according to whom the inscription only means that construction on Amenhotep-Huy's tomb started during Amenhotep III's reign and ended under Akhenaten's, and Amenhotep-Huy thus simply wanted to pay his respects to both rulers.

=== Early reign ===
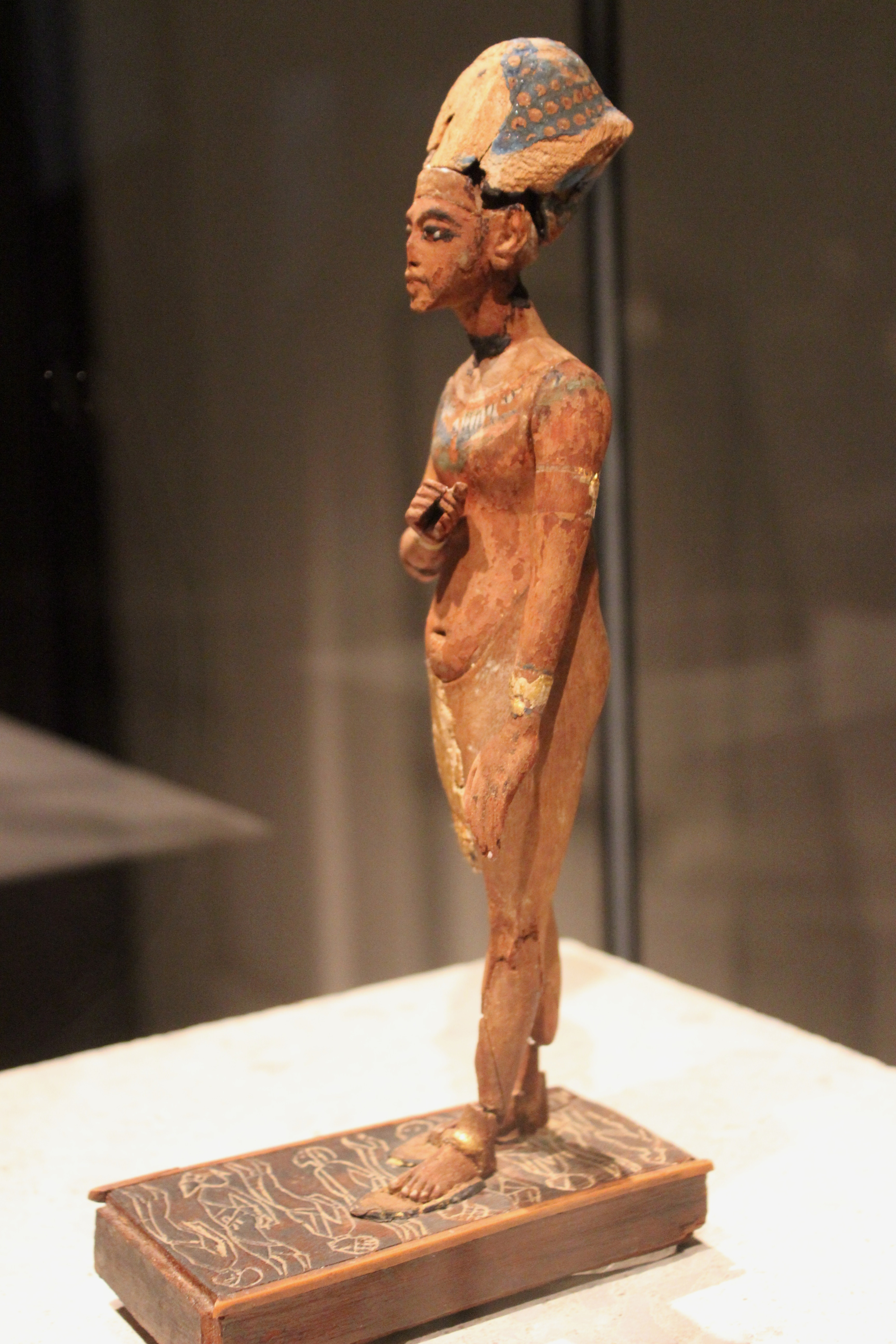
Wooden standing statue of Akhenaten. Currently in the Egyptian Museum of Berlin.

Akhenaten took Egypt's throne as Amenhotep IV, most likely in 1353 or 1351 BC. It is unknown how old Amenhotep IV was when he did this; estimates range from 10 to 23. He was most likely crowned in Thebes, or less likely at Memphis or Armant.

The beginning of Amenhotep IV's reign followed established pharaonic traditions. He did not immediately start redirecting worship toward the Aten and distancing himself from other gods. Egyptologist Donald Redford believes this implied that Amenhotep IV's eventual religious policies were not conceived of before his reign, and he did not follow a pre-established plan or program. Redford points to three pieces of evidence to support this. First, surviving inscriptions show Amenhotep IV worshipping several different gods, including Atum, Osiris, Anubis, Nekhbet, Hathor, and the Eye of Ra, and texts from this era refer to "the gods" and "every god and every goddess". The High Priest of Amun was also still active in the fourth year of Amenhotep IV's reign. Second, even though he later moved his capital from Thebes to Akhetaten, his initial royal titulary honored Thebes—his nomen was "Amenhotep, god-ruler of Thebes"—and recognizing its importance, he called the city "Southern Heliopolis, the first great (seat) of Re (or) the Disc". Third, Amenhotep IV did not yet destroy temples to the other gods and he even continued his father's construction projects at Karnak's Precinct of Amun-Re. He decorated the walls of the precinct's Third Pylon with images of himself worshipping Ra-Horakhty, portrayed in the god's traditional form of a falcon-headed man.

Artistic depictions continued unchanged early in Amenhotep IV's reign. Tombs built or completed in the first few years after he took the throne, such as those of Kheruef, Ramose, and Parennefer, show the pharaoh in the traditional artistic style. In Ramose's tomb, Amenhotep IV appears on the west wall, seated on a throne, with Ramose appearing before the pharaoh. On the other side of the doorway, Amenhotep IV and Nefertiti are shown in the window of appearances, with the Aten depicted as the sun disc. In Parennefer's tomb, Amenhotep IV and Nefertiti are seated on a throne with the sun disc depicted over the pharaoh and his queen.

While continuing the worship of other gods, Amenhotep IV's initial building program sought to build new places of worship to the Aten. He ordered the construction of temples or shrines to the Aten in several cities across the country, such as Bubastis, Tell el-Borg, Heliopolis, Memphis, Nekhen, Kawa, and Kerma. He also ordered the construction of a large temple complex dedicated to the Aten at Karnak in Thebes, northeast of the parts of the Karnak complex dedicated to Amun. The Aten temple complex, collectively known as the Per Aten ("House of the Aten"), consisted of several temples whose names survive: the Gempaaten ("The Aten is found in the estate of the Aten"), the Hwt Benben ("House or Temple of the Benben"), the Rud-Menu ("Enduring of monuments for Aten forever"), the Teni-Menu ("Exalted are the monuments of the Aten forever"), and the Sekhen Aten ("booth of Aten").

Around regnal year two or three, Amenhotep IV organized a Sed festival. Sed festivals were ritual rejuvenations of an aging pharaoh, which usually took place for the first time around the thirtieth year of a pharaoh's reign and every three or so years thereafter. Egyptologists only speculate as to why Amenhotep IV organized a Sed festival when he was likely still in his early 20s. Some historians see it as evidence for Amenhotep III and Amenhotep IV's coregency, and believed that Amenhotep IV's Sed festival coincided with one of his father's celebrations. Others speculate that Amenhotep IV chose to hold his festival three years after his father's death, aiming to proclaim his rule a continuation of his father's reign. Yet others believe that the festival was held to honor the Aten on whose behalf the pharaoh ruled Egypt, or, as Amenhotep III was considered to have become one with the Aten following his death, the Sed festival honored both the pharaoh and the god at the same time. It is also possible that the purpose of the ceremony was to figuratively fill Amenhotep IV with strength before his great enterprise: the introduction of the Aten cult and the founding of the new capital Akhetaten. Regardless of the celebration's aim, Egyptologists believe that during the festivities Amenhotep IV only made offerings to the Aten rather than the many gods and goddesses, as was customary.

=== Name change ===
Among the last documents that refer to Akhenaten as Amenhotep IV are two copies of a letter to the pharaoh from Ipy, the high steward of Memphis. These letters, found at Gurob, informing the pharaoh that the royal estates in Memphis are "in good order" and the temple of Ptah is "prosperous and flourishing", are dated to regnal year five, day nineteen of the growing season's third month. About a month later, day thirteen of the growing season's fourth month, one of the boundary stela at Akhetaten already had the name Akhenaten carved on it, implying that the pharaoh changed his name between the two inscriptions.

Amenhotep IV changed his royal titulary to show his devotion to the Aten. No longer would he be known as Amenhotep IV and be associated with the god Amun, but rather he would completely shift his focus to the Aten. Egyptologists debate the exact meaning of Akhenaten, his new personal name. The word "akh" (Ancient Egyptian: ꜣḫ) could have different translations, such as "satisfied", "effective spirit", or "serviceable to", and thus Akhenaten's name could be translated to mean "Aten is satisfied", "Effective spirit of the Aten", or "Serviceable to the Aten". Gertie Englund and Florence Friedman arrive at the translation "Effective for the Aten" by analyzing contemporary texts and inscriptions, in which Akhenaten often described himself as being "effective for" the sun disc. Englund and Friedman conclude that the frequency with which Akhenaten used this term likely means that his own name meant "Effective for the Aten".

Some historians, such as William Albright, Edel Elmar, and Gerhard Fecht propose that Akhenaten's name is misspelled and mispronounced. These historians believe "Aten" should rather be "Jāti", thus rendering the pharaoh's name Akhenjāti or Aḫanjāti (pronounced /ˌækəˈnjɑːtɪ/) in Ancient Egypt.

	Amenhotep IV	Akhenaten
Horus name	E1 D40 N29 A28 S9 Kanakht-qai-Shuti "Strong Bull of the Double Plumes"	i t n N5 mr Meryaten "Beloved of Aten"
Nebty name	wr r sw t n i i m i t p Q1 t Z2; Wer-nesut-em-Ipet-swt "Great of Kingship in Karnak"	wr r sw i i Aa15 N27 i t n N5; Wer-nesut-em-Akhetaten "Great of Kingship in Akhet-Aten"
Golden Horus name	U39 Y1 N28 Z2ss m O28 W24 O49 M27; Wetjes-khau-em-Iunu-Shemay "Crowned in Heliopolis of the South" (Thebes)	U39 r n V10 n i t n N5; Wetjes-ren-en-Aten "Exalter of the Name of Aten"
Prenomen	ra nfr xpr Z3 ra wa n Neferkheperure-waenre "Beautiful are the Forms of Re, the Unique one of Re"	
Nomen	i mn n Htp R8 S38 R19; Amenhotep Netjer-Heqa-Waset "Amun is Satisfied, Divine Lord of Thebes"	i t n ra G25 x n Akhenaten "Effective for the Aten"

=== Founding Amarna ===
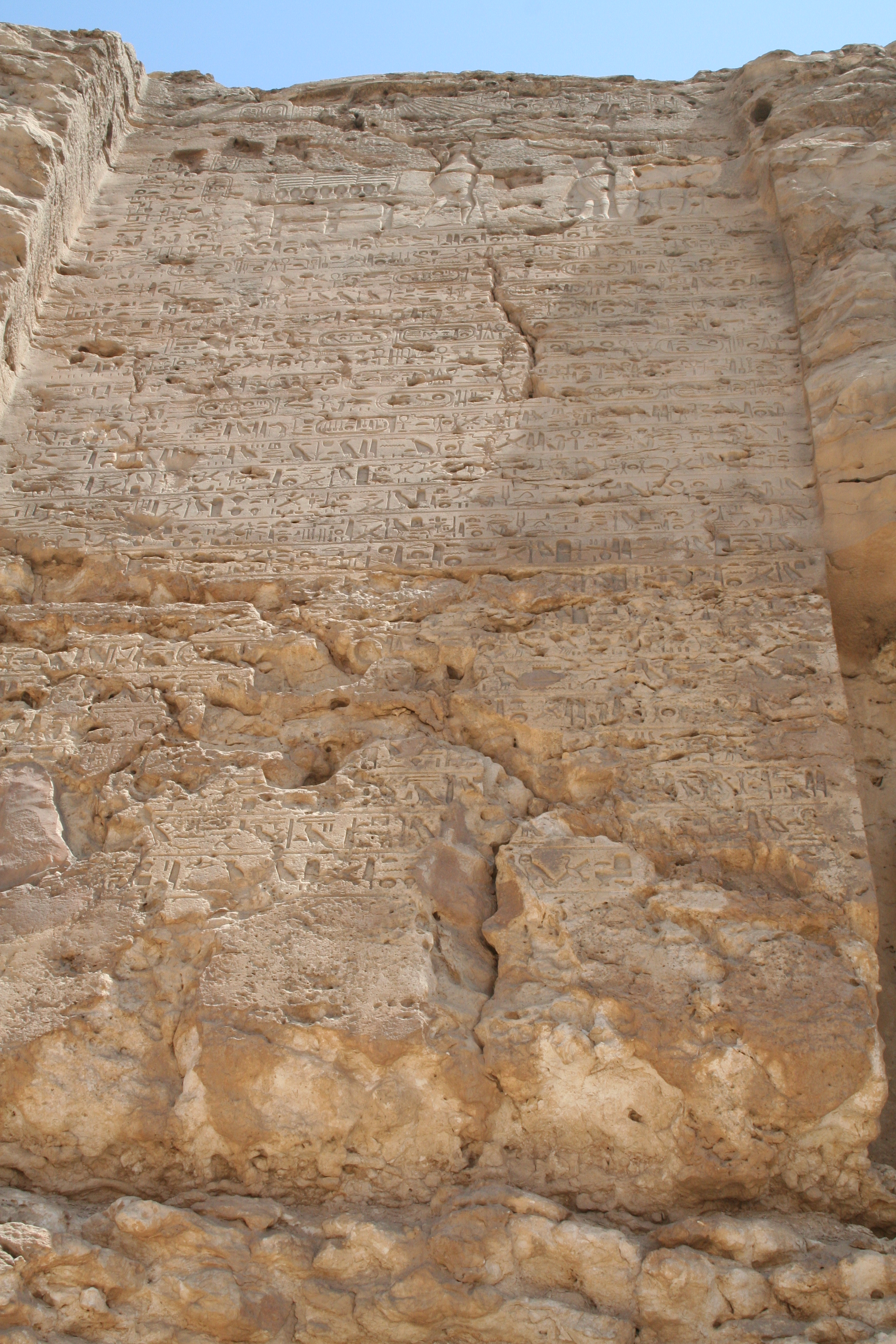
One of the stele marking the boundary of the new capital Akhetaten

Around the same time he changed his royal titulary, on the thirteenth day of the growing season's fourth month, Akhenaten decreed that a new capital city be built: Akhetaten (Ancient Egyptian: ꜣḫt-jtn, meaning "Horizon of the Aten"), better known today as Amarna.

The events that Egyptologists know the most about during Akhenaten's life are connected with founding Akhetaten, as several so-called boundary stelae were found around the city to mark its boundary. The pharaoh chose a site about halfway between Thebes, the capital at the time, and Memphis, on the east bank of the Nile, where a wadi and a natural dip in the surrounding cliffs form a silhouette similar to the "horizon" hieroglyph. Additionally, the site had previously been uninhabited. According to inscriptions on one boundary stela, the site was appropriate for Aten's city for "not being the property of a god, nor being the property of a goddess, nor being the property of a ruler, nor being the property of a female ruler, nor being the property of any people able to lay claim to it."

Historians do not know for certain why Akhenaten established a new capital and left Thebes, the old capital. The boundary stelae detailing Akhetaten's founding is damaged where it likely explained the pharaoh's motives for the move. Surviving parts claim what happened to Akhenaten was "worse than those that I heard" previously in his reign and worse than those "heard by any kings who assumed the White Crown", and alludes to "offensive" speech against the Aten. Egyptologists believe that Akhenaten could be referring to conflict with the priesthood and followers of Amun, the patron god of Thebes.

The great temples of Amun, such as Karnak, were all located in Thebes and the priests there achieved significant power earlier in the Eighteenth Dynasty, especially under Hatshepsut and Thutmose III, thanks to pharaohs offering large amounts of Egypt's growing wealth to the cult of Amun; historians, such as Donald B. Redford, therefore posited that by moving to a new capital, Akhenaten may have been trying to break with Amun's priests and the god.

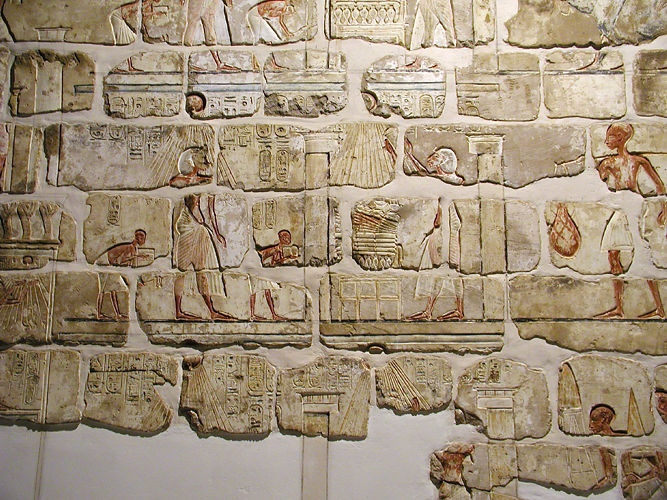
Talatat blocks from Akhenaten's Aten temple in Karnak

Akhetaten was a planned city with the Great Temple of the Aten, Small Aten Temple, royal residences, records office, and government buildings in the city center. Some of these buildings, such as the Aten temples, were ordered to be built by Akhenaten on the boundary stela decreeing the city's founding.

The city was built quickly, thanks to a new construction method that used substantially smaller building blocks than under previous pharaohs. These blocks, called talatats, measured 1/2 by 1/2 by 1 ancient Egyptian cubits (c. 27 by 27 by 54 cm), and because of the smaller weight and standardized size, using them during constructions was more efficient than using heavy building blocks of varying sizes. By regnal year eight, Akhetaten reached a state where it could be occupied by the royal family. Only his most loyal subjects followed Akhenaten and his family to the new city. While the city continued to be built, in years five through eight, construction work began to stop in Thebes. The Theban Aten temples that had begun were abandoned, and a village of those working on Valley of the Kings tombs was relocated to the workers' village at Akhetaten. However, construction work continued in the rest of the country, as larger cult centers, such as Heliopolis and Memphis, also had temples built for Aten.

=== International relations ===
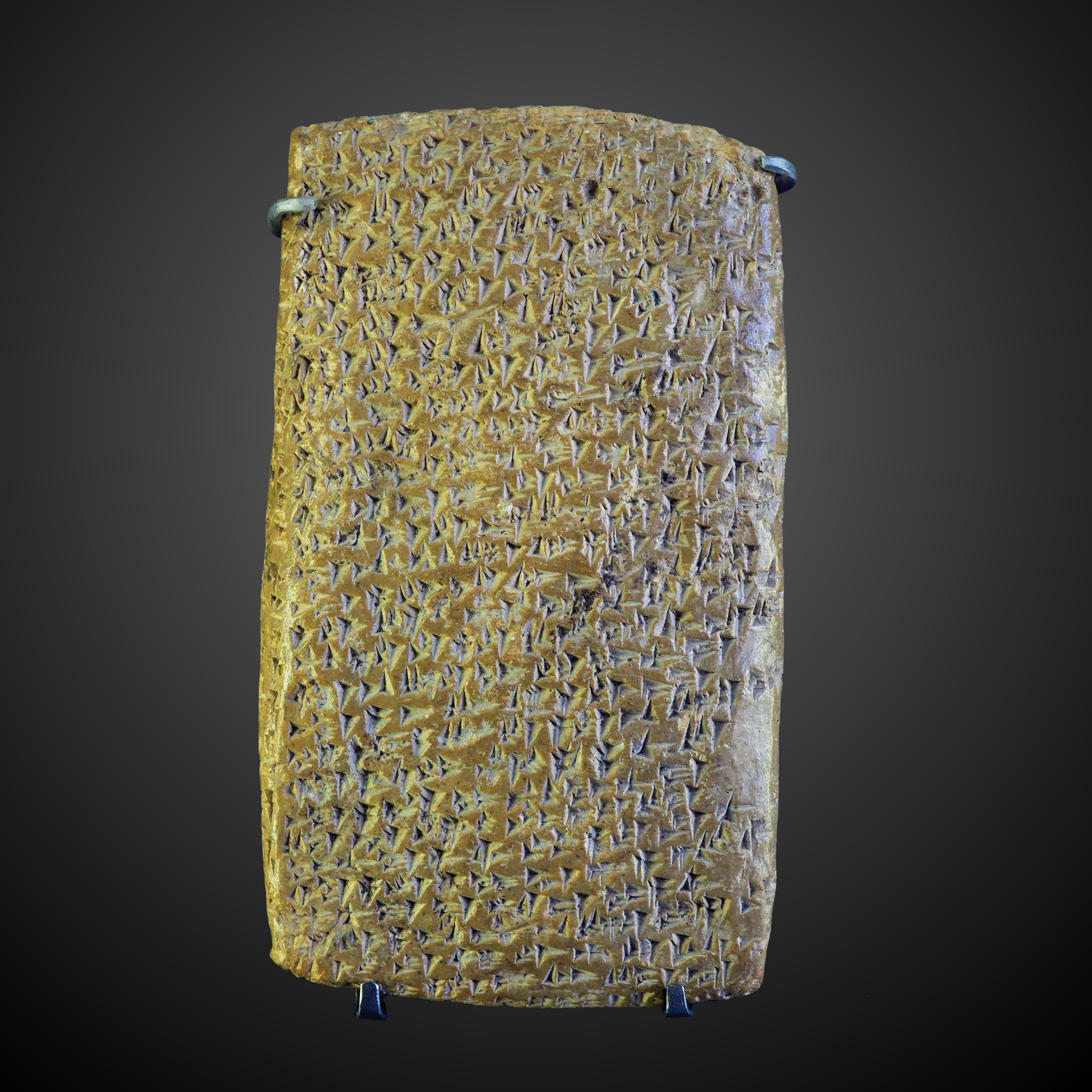
Amarna letter EA 362, titled A Commissioner Murdered. In this letter, Rib-Hadda of Byblos informs the pharaoh of the death of Pawura, an Egyptian commissioner.

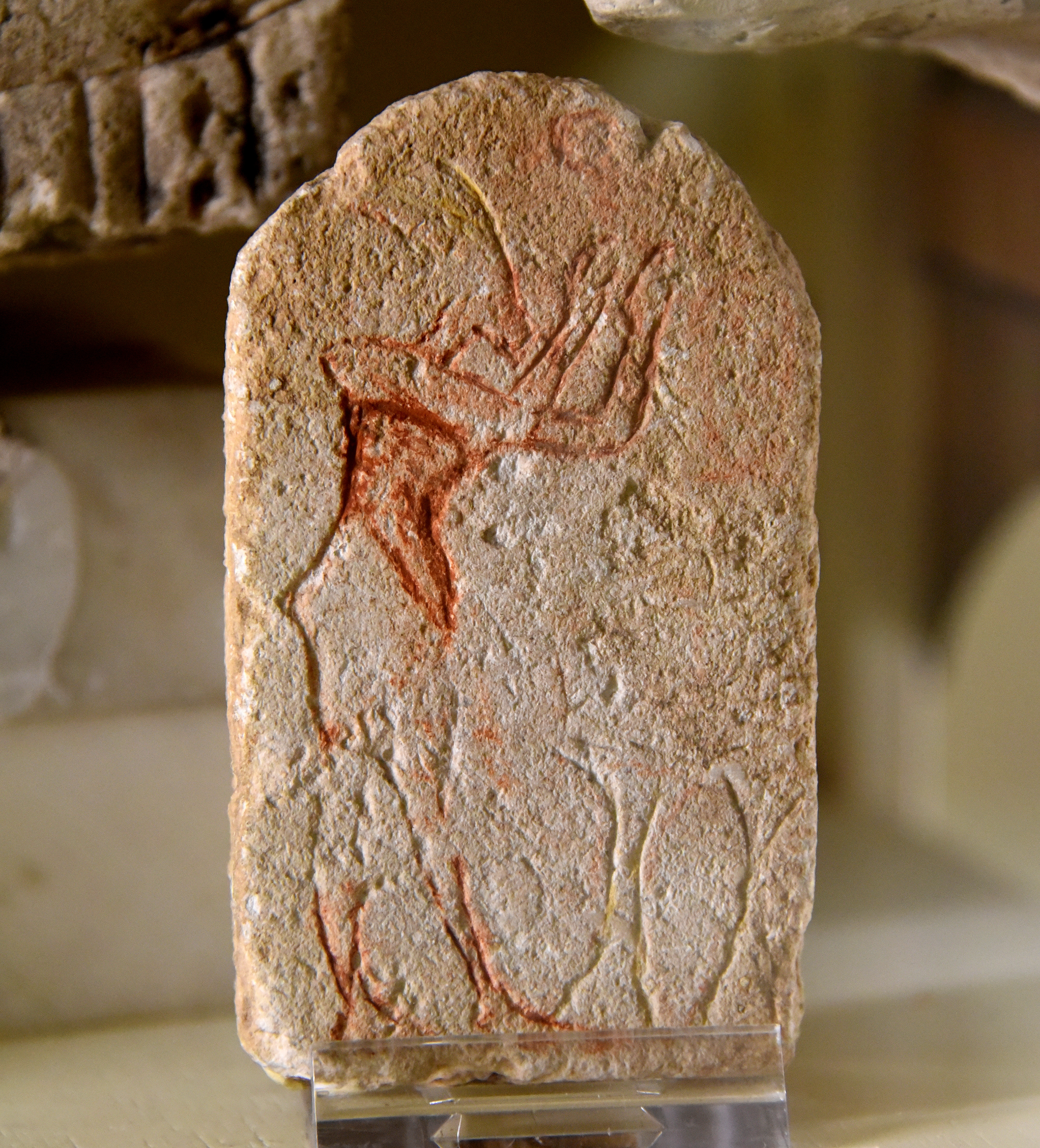
Painted limestone miniature stela. It shows Akhenaten standing before two incense stands, Aten disc above. From Amarna, Egypt – 18th Dynasty. Petrie Museum, London.

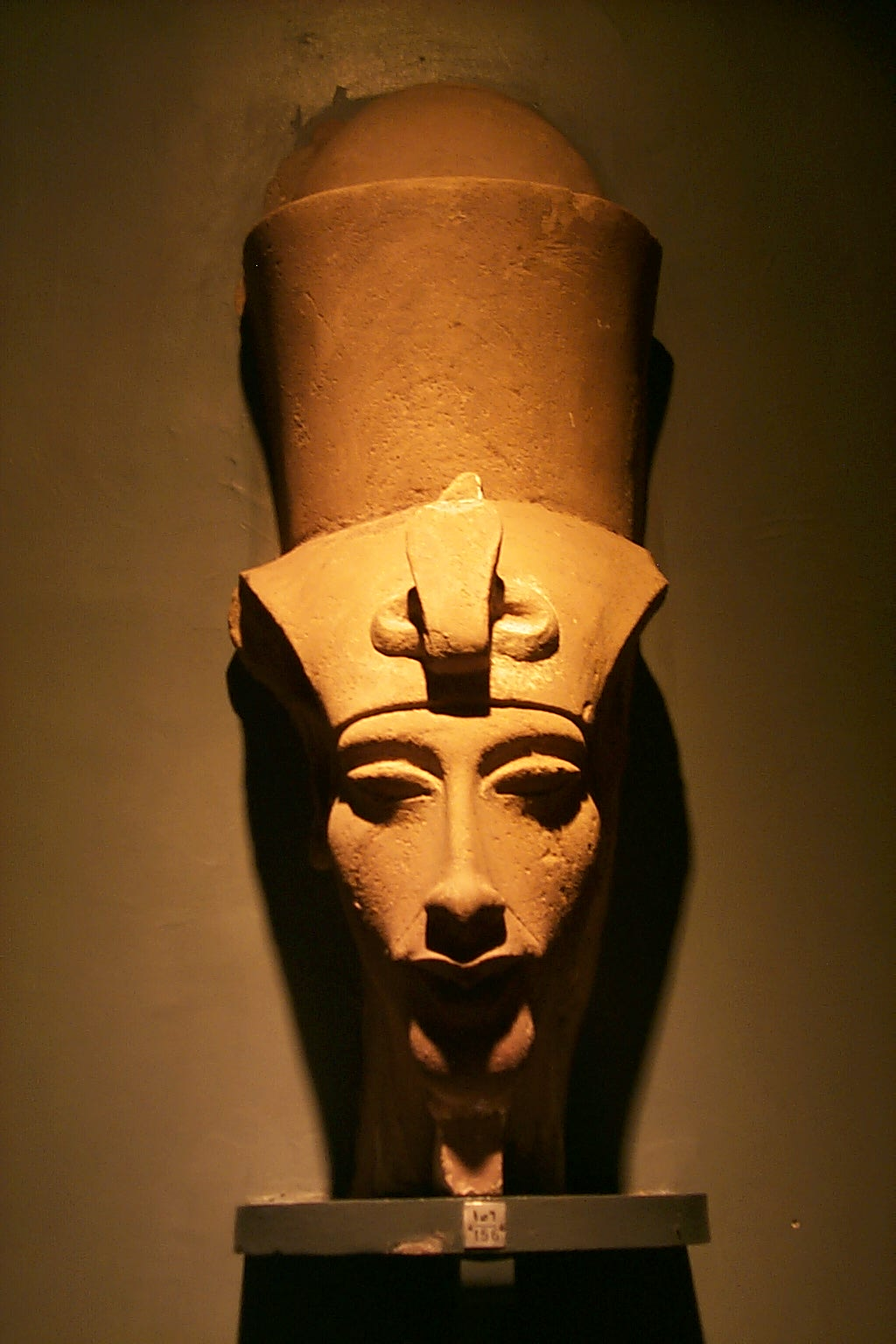
Head of Akhenaten

The Amarna letters have provided important evidence about Akhenaten's reign and foreign policy. The letters are a cache of 382 diplomatic texts and literary and educational materials discovered between 1887 and 1979, and named after Amarna, the modern name for Akhenaten's capital Akhetaten. The diplomatic correspondence comprises clay tablet messages between Amenhotep III, Akhenaten, and Tutankhamun, various subjects through Egyptian military outposts, rulers of vassal states, and the foreign rulers of Babylonia, Assyria, Syria, Canaan, Alashiya, Arzawa, Mitanni, and the Hittites.

The Amarna letters portray the international situation in the Eastern Mediterranean that Akhenaten inherited from his predecessors. In the 200 years preceding Akhenaten's reign, following the expulsion of the Hyksos from Lower Egypt at the end of the Second Intermediate Period, the kingdom's influence and military might increased greatly. Egypt's power reached new heights under Thutmose III, who ruled approximately 100 years before Akhenaten and led several successful military campaigns into Nubia and Syria. Egypt's expansion led to confrontation with the Mitanni, but this rivalry ended with the two nations becoming allies. Slowly, however, Egypt's power started to wane. Amenhotep III aimed to maintain the balance of power through marriages—such as his marriage to Tadukhipa, daughter of the Mitanni king Tushratta—and vassal states. Under Amenhotep III and Akhenaten, Egypt was unable or unwilling to oppose the rise of the Hittites around Syria. The pharaohs seemed to eschew military confrontation at a time when the balance of power between Egypt's neighbors and rivals was shifting, and the Hittites, a confrontational state, overtook the Mitanni in influence.

Early in his reign, Akhenaten was evidently concerned about the expanding power of the Hittite Empire under Šuppiluliuma I. A successful Hittite attack on Mitanni and its ruler Tushratta would have disrupted the entire international balance of power in the Ancient Middle East at a time when Egypt had made peace with Mitanni; this would cause some of Egypt's vassals to switch their allegiances to the Hittites, as time would prove. A group of Egypt's allies who attempted to rebel against the Hittites were captured, and wrote letters begging Akhenaten for troops, but he did not respond to most of their pleas. Evidence suggests that the troubles on the northern frontier led to difficulties in Canaan, particularly in a struggle for power between Labaya of Shechem and Abdi-Heba of Jerusalem, which required the pharaoh to intervene in the area by dispatching Medjay troops northwards. Akhenaten pointedly refused to save his vassal Rib-Hadda of Byblos—whose kingdom was being besieged by the expanding state of Amurru under Abdi-Ashirta and later Aziru, son of Abdi-Ashirta—despite Rib-Hadda's numerous pleas for help from the pharaoh. Rib-Hadda wrote a total of 60 letters to Akhenaten pleading for aid from the pharaoh. Akhenaten wearied of Rib-Hadda's constant correspondences and once told Rib-Hadda: "You are the one that writes to me more than all the (other) mayors" or Egyptian vassals in EA 124. What Rib-Hadda did not comprehend was that the Egyptian king would not organize and dispatch an entire army north just to preserve the political status quo of several minor city states on the fringes of Egypt's Asiatic Empire. Rib-Hadda would pay the ultimate price; his exile from Byblos due to a coup led by his brother Ilirabih is mentioned in one letter. When Rib-Hadda appealed in vain for aid from Akhenaten and then turned to Aziru, his sworn enemy, to place him back on the throne of his city, Aziru promptly had him dispatched to the king of Sidon, where Rib-Hadda was almost certainly executed.

In a view discounted by the 21st century, several Egyptologists in the late 19th and 20th centuries interpreted the Amarna letters to mean that Akhenaten was a pacifist who neglected foreign policy and Egypt's foreign territories in favor of his internal reforms. For example, Henry Hall believed Akhenaten "succeeded by his obstinate doctrinaire love of peace in causing far more misery in his world than half a dozen elderly militarists could have done," while James Henry Breasted said Akhenaten "was not fit to cope with a situation demanding an aggressive man of affairs and a skilled military leader." Others noted that the Amarna letters counter the conventional view that Akhenaten neglected Egypt's foreign territories in favour of his internal reforms. For instance, Norman de Garis Davies praised Akhenaten's emphasis on diplomacy over war, while James Baikie said that the fact "that there is no evidence of revolt within the borders of Egypt itself during the whole reign is surely ample proof that there was no such abandonment of his royal duties on the part of Akhenaten as has been assumed." Indeed, several letters from Egyptian vassals notified the pharaoh that they have followed his instructions, implying that the pharaoh sent such instructions. The Amarna letters also show that vassal states were told repeatedly to expect the arrival of the Egyptian military on their lands, and provide evidence that these troops were dispatched and arrived at their destination. Dozens of letters detail that Akhenaten—and Amenhotep III—sent Egyptian and Nubian troops, armies, archers, chariots, horses, and ships.

Only one military campaign is known for certain under Akhenaten's reign. In his second or 12th year, Akhenaten ordered his Viceroy of Kush Tuthmose to lead a military expedition to quell a rebellion and raids on settlements on the Nile by Nubian nomadic tribes. The victory was commemorated on two stelae, one discovered at Amada and another at Buhen. Egyptologists differ on the size of the campaign: Wolfgang Helck considered it a small-scale police operation, while Alan Schulman considered it a "war of major proportions".

Other Egyptologists suggested that Akhenaten could have waged war in Syria or the Levant, possibly against the Hittites. Cyril Aldred, based on Amarna letters describing Egyptian troop movements, proposed that Akhenaten launched an unsuccessful war around the city of Gezer, while Marc Gabolde argued for an unsuccessful campaign around Kadesh. Either of these could be the campaign referred to on Tutankhamun's Restoration Stela: "if an army was sent to Djahy [southern Canaan and Syria] to broaden the boundaries of Egypt, no success of their cause came to pass." John Darnell and Colleen Manassa also argued that Akhenaten fought with the Hittites for control of Kadesh, but was unsuccessful; the city was not recaptured until 60–70 years later, under Seti I.

Overall, archeological evidence suggests that Akhenaten paid close attention to the affairs of Egyptian vassals in Canaan and Syria, though primarily not through letters such as those found at Amarna but through reports from government officials and agents. Akhenaten managed to preserve Egypt's control over the core of its Near Eastern Empire (which consisted of present-day Israel as well as the Phoenician coast) while avoiding conflict with the increasingly powerful and aggressive Hittites of Šuppiluliuma I, which overtook Mitanni as the dominant power in the northern part of the region. Only the Egyptian border province of Amurru in Syria around the Orontes River was lost to the Hittites when its ruler Aziru defected to the Hittites; ordered by Akhenaten to come to Egypt, Aziru was released after promising to stay loyal to the pharaoh, nonetheless turning to the Hittites soon after his release.

=== Later years ===
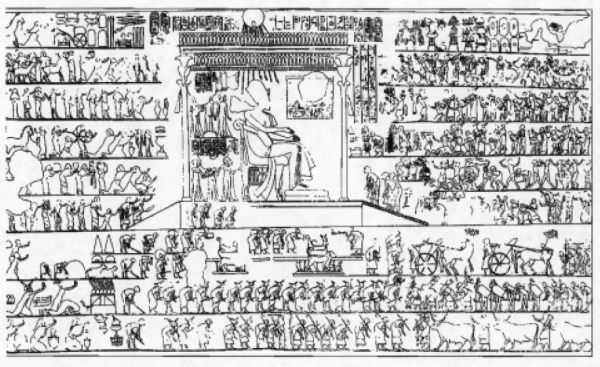
In regnal year 12, Akhenaten received tributes and offerings from allied countries and vassal states at Akhetaten, as depicted in the tomb of Meryre II

Egyptologists know little about the last five years of Akhenaten's reign, beginning c. 1341 or 1339 BC. These years are poorly attested and only a few pieces of contemporary evidence survive; the lack of clarity makes reconstructing the latter part of the pharaoh's reign "a daunting task" and a controversial and contested topic of discussion among Egyptologists.

Among the newest pieces of evidence is an inscription discovered in 2012 at a limestone quarry in Deir el-Bersha, just north of Akhetaten, from the pharaoh's 16th regnal year. The text refers to a building project in Amarna and establishes that Akhenaten and Nefertiti were still a royal couple just a year before Akhenaten's death. The inscription is dated to Year 16, month 3 of Akhet, day 15 of the reign of Akhenaten.

Before the 2012 discovery of the Deir el-Bersha inscription, the last known fixed-date event in Akhenaten's reign was a royal reception in regnal year 12, in which the pharaoh and the royal family received tributes and offerings from allied countries and vassal states at Akhetaten. Inscriptions show tributes from Nubia, the Land of Punt, Syria, Hittite, the islands in the Mediterranean Sea, and Libya. Egyptologists, such as Aidan Dodson, consider this year 12 celebration to be the zenith of Akhenaten's reign. Thanks to reliefs in the tomb of courtier Meryre II, historians know that the royal family, Akhenaten, Nefertiti, and their six daughters, were present at the royal reception in full. However, historians are uncertain about the reasons for the reception. Possibilities include the celebration of the marriage of future pharaoh Ay to Tey, celebration of Akhenaten's twelve years on the throne, the summons of king Aziru of Amurru to Egypt, a military victory at Sumur in the Levant, a successful military campaign in Nubia, Nefertiti's ascendancy to the throne as coregent, or the completion of the new capital city Akhetaten.

Following year 12, Donald Redford and other Egyptologists proposed that Egypt was struck by an epidemic, most likely a plague. Contemporary evidence suggests that a plague ravaged through the Middle East around this time, and ambassadors and delegations arriving to Akhenaten's year twelve reception might have brought the disease to Egypt. Alternatively, letters from the Hattians might suggest that the epidemic originated in Egypt and was carried throughout the Middle East by Egyptian prisoners of war. Regardless of its origin, the epidemic might account for several deaths in the royal family that occurred in the last five years of Akhenaten's reign, including those of his daughters Meketaten, Neferneferure, and Setepenre.

=== Coregency with Smenkhkare or Nefertiti ===
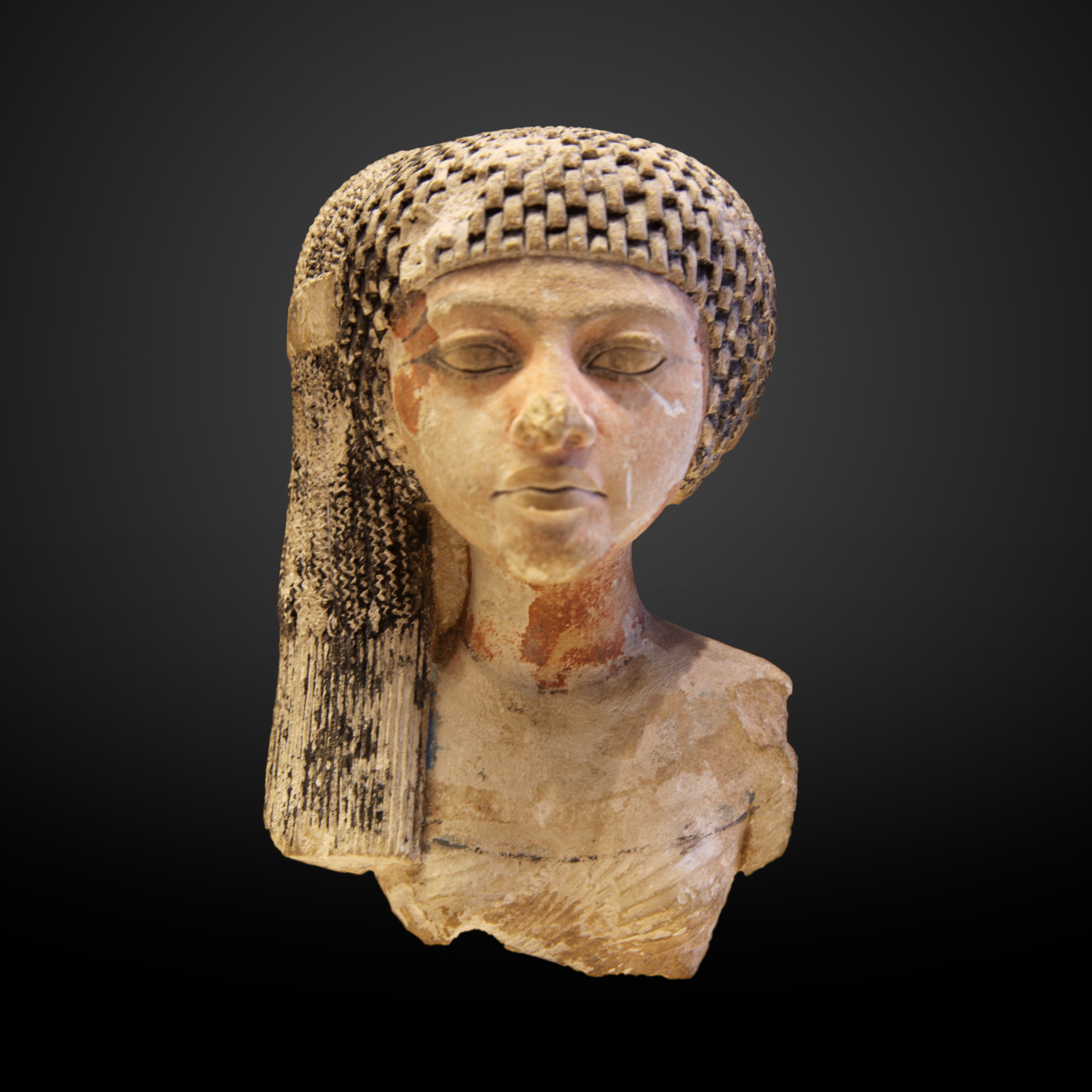
Bust of a daughter of Akhenaten and Nefertiti, perhaps the young Meritaten, in the Louvre, Paris

Akhenaten could have ruled together with Smenkhkare and Nefertiti for several years before his death. Based on depictions and artifacts from the tombs of Meryre II and Tutankhamun, Smenkhkare could have been Akhenaten's coregent by regnal year 13 or 14, but died a year or two later. Nefertiti might not have assumed the role of coregent until after year 16, when a stela still mentions her as Akhenaten's Great Royal Wife. While Nefertiti's familial relationship with Akhenaten is known, whether Akhenaten and Smenkhkare were related by blood is unclear. Smenkhkare could have been Akhenaten's son or brother, as the son of Amenhotep III with Tiye or Sitamun. Archaeological evidence makes it clear, however, that Smenkhkare was married to Meritaten, Akhenaten's eldest daughter. For another, the so-called Coregency Stela, found in a tomb at Akhetaten, might show queen Nefertiti as Akhenaten's coregent, but this is uncertain as the stela was recarved to show the names of Ankhesenpaaten and Neferneferuaten. Egyptologist Aidan Dodson proposed that both Smenkhkare and Neferiti were Akhenaten's coregents to ensure the Amarna family's continued rule when Egypt was confronted with an epidemic. Dodson suggested that the two were chosen to rule as Tutankhaten's coregent in case Akhenaten died and Tutankhaten took the throne at a young age, or rule in Tutankhaten's stead if the prince also died in the epidemic.

=== Death and burial ===
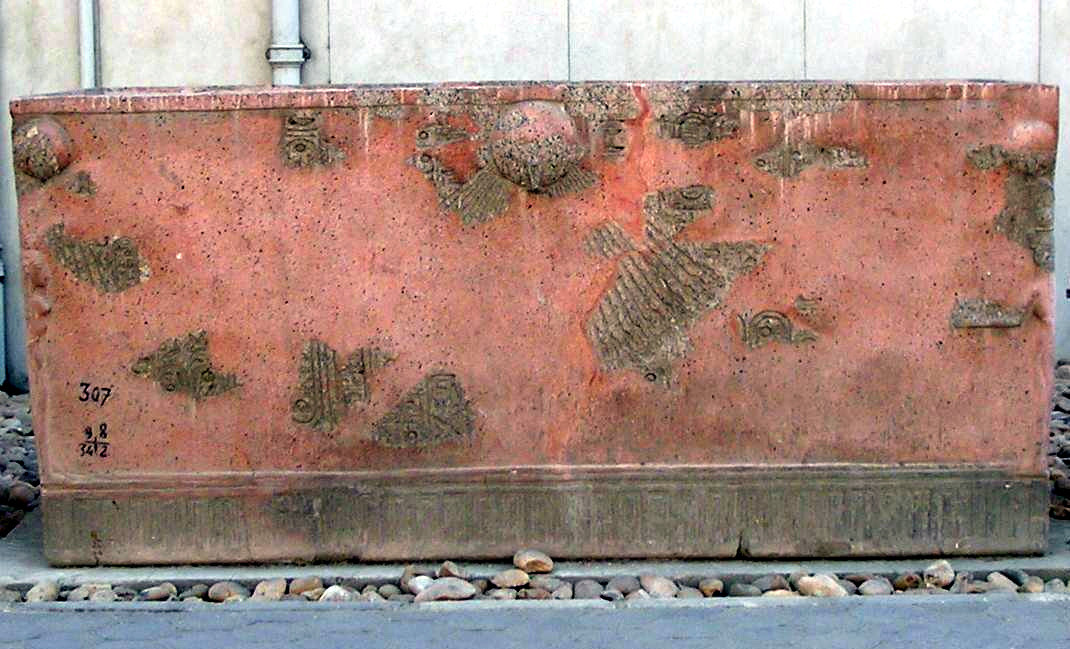
Akhenaten's sarcophagus reconstituted from pieces discovered in his original tomb in Amarna, now in the Egyptian Museum, Cairo

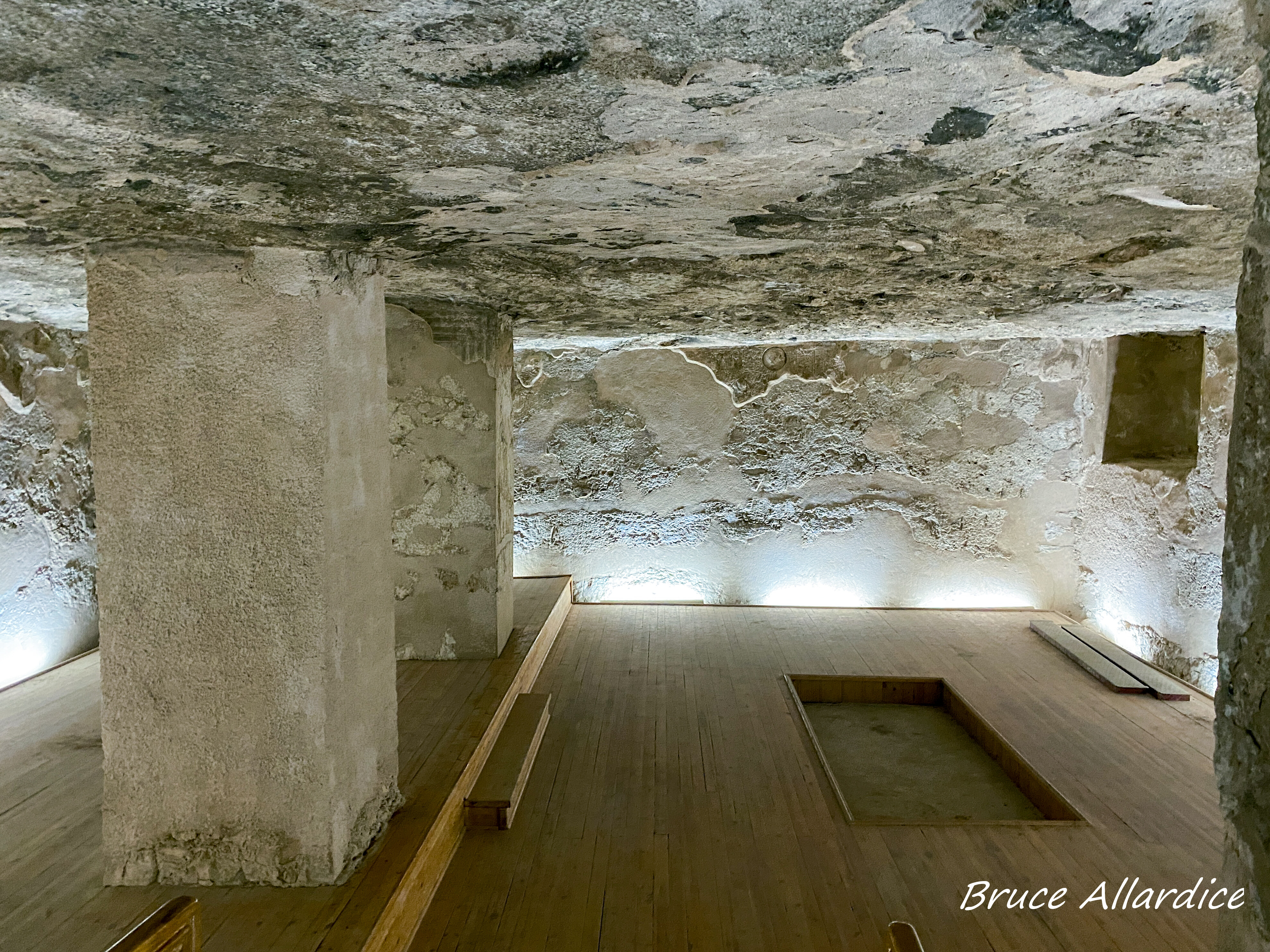
Akhenaten's original tomb burial chamber at Amarna

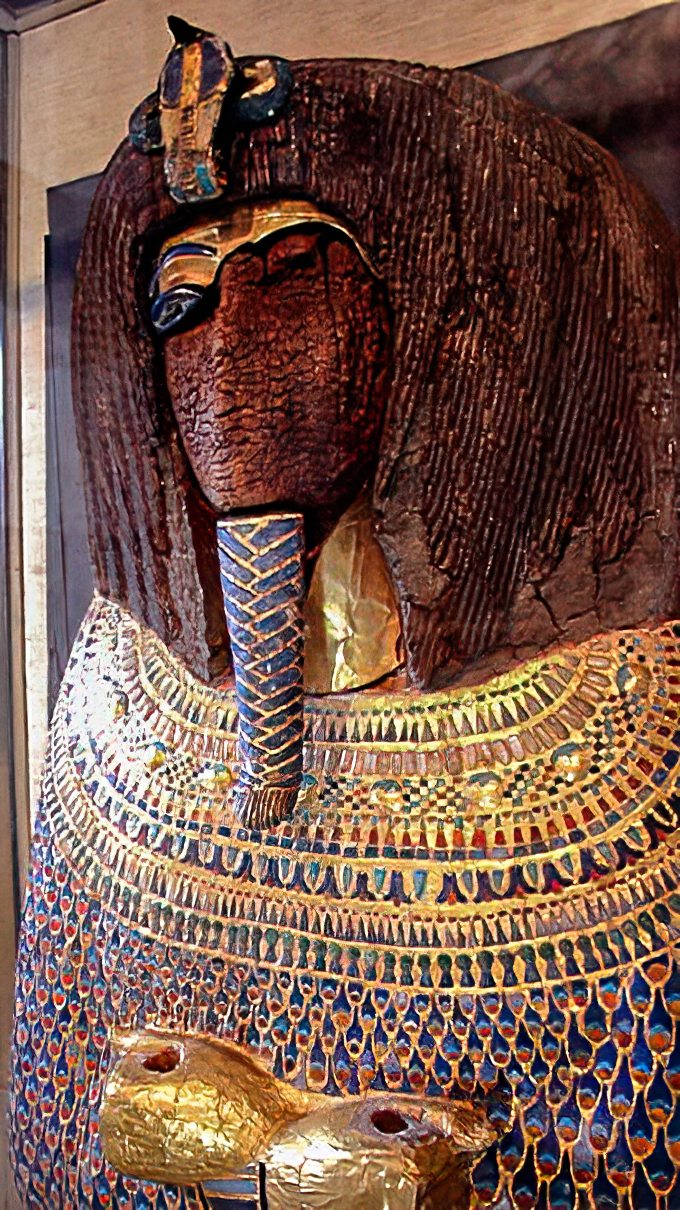
The desecrated royal coffin (thought to be Akhenaten) that was found in Tomb KV55

Akhenaten died in his 17th year from wine docket evidence found at Amarna and was initially buried in a tomb in the Royal Wadi east of Akhetaten. The order to construct the tomb and to bury the pharaoh there was commemorated on one of the boundary stela delineating the capital's borders: "Let a tomb be made for me in the eastern mountain [of Akhetaten]. Let my burial be made in it, in the millions of jubilees which the Aten, my father, decreed for me." Akhenaten's burial chamber can easily be detected in his Royal Tomb of Akhenaten since it is the only tomb which was fully finished; the rest of the tomb consists of unfinished rock cut tomb chambers and rooms which were likely meant to inter other members of the royal family such as his queen Nefertiti. However, work on the tomb stopped when the Egyptian royal family later moved to Thebes and abandoned Amarna Tutankhaten around 3 years after Akhenaten's death.

In the years following the burial, Akhenaten's sarcophagus was destroyed and left in the Akhetaten necropolis; reconstructed in the 20th century, it is in the Egyptian Museum in Cairo as of 2019. Despite leaving the sarcophagus behind, Akhenaten's mummy was removed from the royal tombs after Tutankhaten abandoned Akhetaten and returned to Thebes. It was most likely moved to tomb KV55 in Valley of the Kings near Thebes. This tomb was later desecrated, likely during the Ramesside period.

Whether Smenkhkare also enjoyed a brief independent reign after Akhenaten is unclear. If Smenkhkare outlived Akhenaten, and became sole pharaoh, he likely ruled Egypt for less than a year. The next successor is thought by some to be Nefertiti or Meritaten ruling as Neferneferuaten, reigning in Egypt for around two years. She was, in turn, probably succeeded by Tutankhaten, with the country being administered by the vizier and future pharaoh Ay.

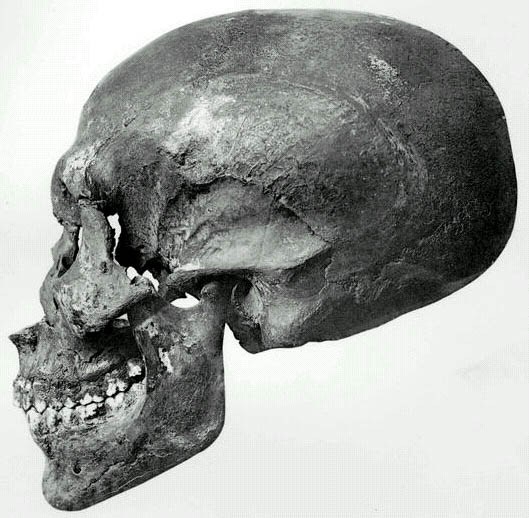
Profile view of the skull thought to be Akhenaten's recovered from KV55

While Akhenaten—perhaps along with Smenkhkare—was most likely reburied in tomb KV55, the identification of the mummy found in that tomb as Akhenaten remains controversial to this day. The mummy has repeatedly been examined since its discovery in 1907. Most recently, Egyptologist Zahi Hawass led a team of researchers to examine the mummy using medical and DNA analysis, with the results published in 2010. In releasing their test results, Hawass's team identified the mummy as the father of Tutankhamun and thus "most probably" Akhenaten. However, the study's validity has since been called into question. For instance, the discussion of the study results does not discuss that Tutankhamun's father and the father's siblings would share some genetic markers; if Tutankhamun's father was Akhenaten, the DNA results could indicate that the mummy is a brother of Akhenaten, possibly Smenkhkare.

Moreover, according to the genetic research KV55 cannot be maternal grandfather of the two daughters of Tutankhamun, who are believed to be children of Akhenaten's daughter, Ankhesenamun. Juan Belmonte notes three possible resolutions of this problem: either (1) Tutankhamun fathered the two princesses by different consort(s), (2) KV55 is not Akhenaten but Smenkhkare (option considered by Belmonte to be the most probable) or (3) KV55 is indeed Akhenaten but he was not biological father of Ankhesenamun because of Nefertiti's extramarital affair (which Belmonte describes as "historical speculation, possible but improbable").

=== Legacy ===
With Akhenaten's death, the Aten cult he had founded fell out of favor: at first gradually, and then with decisive finality. Tutankhaten changed his name to Tutankhamun in Year 2 of his reign (c. 1332 BC) and abandoned the city of Akhetaten. Their successors then attempted to erase Akhenaten and his family from the historical record. His name was erased from monuments, with later pharaohs often calling him "the enemy of Akhetaten". During the reign of Horemheb, the last pharaoh of the Eighteenth Dynasty and the first pharaoh after Akhenaten who was not related to Akhenaten's family, Egyptians started to destroy temples to the Aten and reuse the building blocks in new construction projects, including in temples for the newly restored god Amun. Horemheb's successor continued in this effort. Seti I restored monuments to Amun and had the god's name re-carved on inscriptions where it was removed by Akhenaten. Seti I also ordered that Akhenaten, Smenkhkare, Neferneferuaten, Tutankhamun, and Ay be excised from official lists of pharaohs to make it appear that Amenhotep III was immediately succeeded by Horemheb. Under the Ramessides, who succeeded Seti I, Akhetaten was gradually destroyed and the building material reused across the country, such as in constructions at Hermopolis. The negative attitudes toward Akhenaten were illustrated by, for example, inscriptions in the tomb of scribe Mose (or Mes), where Akhenaten's reign is referred to as "the time of the enemy of Akhetaten".

Some Egyptologists, such as Jacobus Dijk and Jan Assmann, believe that Akhenaten's reign and the Amarna period started a gradual decline in the Egyptian government's power and the pharaoh's standing in Egyptian's society and religious life. Akhenaten's religious reforms subverted the relationship ordinary Egyptians had with their gods and their pharaoh, as well as the role the pharaoh played in the relationship between the people and the gods. Before the Amarna period, the pharaoh was the representative of the gods on Earth, the son of the god Ra, and the living incarnation of the god Horus, and maintained the divine order through rituals and offerings and by sustaining the temples of the gods. Additionally, even though the pharaoh oversaw all religious activity, Egyptians could access their gods through regular public holidays, festivals, and processions. This led to a seemingly close connection between people and the gods, especially the patron deity of their respective towns and cities.

Akhenaten, however, banned the worship of gods beside the Aten, including through festivals. He also declared himself to be the only one who could worship the Aten, and required that all religious devotion previously exhibited toward the gods be directed toward himself. After the Amarna period, during the 19th and 20th Dynasties—around 270 years following Akhenaten's death—the relationship between the people, the pharaoh, and the gods did not simply revert to pre-Amarna practices and beliefs. The worship of all gods returned, but the relationship between the gods and the worshipers became more direct and personal, circumventing the pharaoh. Rather than acting through the pharaoh, Egyptians started to believe that the gods intervened directly in their lives, protecting the pious and punishing criminals. The gods replaced the pharaoh as their own representatives on Earth. The god Amun once again became king among all gods. According to van Dijk, "the king was no longer a god, but god himself had become king. Once Amun had been recognized as the true king, the political power of the earthly rulers could be reduced to a minimum." Consequently, the influence and power of the Amun priesthood continued to grow until the 21st Dynasty, c. 1077 BC, by which time the High Priests of Amun effectively became rulers over parts of Egypt.

Akhenaten's reforms also had a longer-term impact on Ancient Egyptian language and hastened the spread of the spoken Late Egyptian language in official writings and speeches. Spoken and written Egyptian diverged early on in Egyptian history and stayed different over time. During the Amarna period, however, royal and religious texts and inscriptions, including the boundary stelae at Akhetaten or the Amarna letters, started to regularly include more vernacular linguistic elements, such as the definite article or a new possessive form. Even though they continued to diverge, these changes brought the spoken and written language closer to one another more systematically than under previous pharaohs of the New Kingdom. While Akhenaten's successors attempted to erase his religious, artistic, and even linguistic changes from history, the new linguistic elements remained a more common part of official texts following the Amarna years, starting with the 19th Dynasty.

Akhenaten is also recognized as a Prophet in the Druze faith.

== Atenism ==
Aten

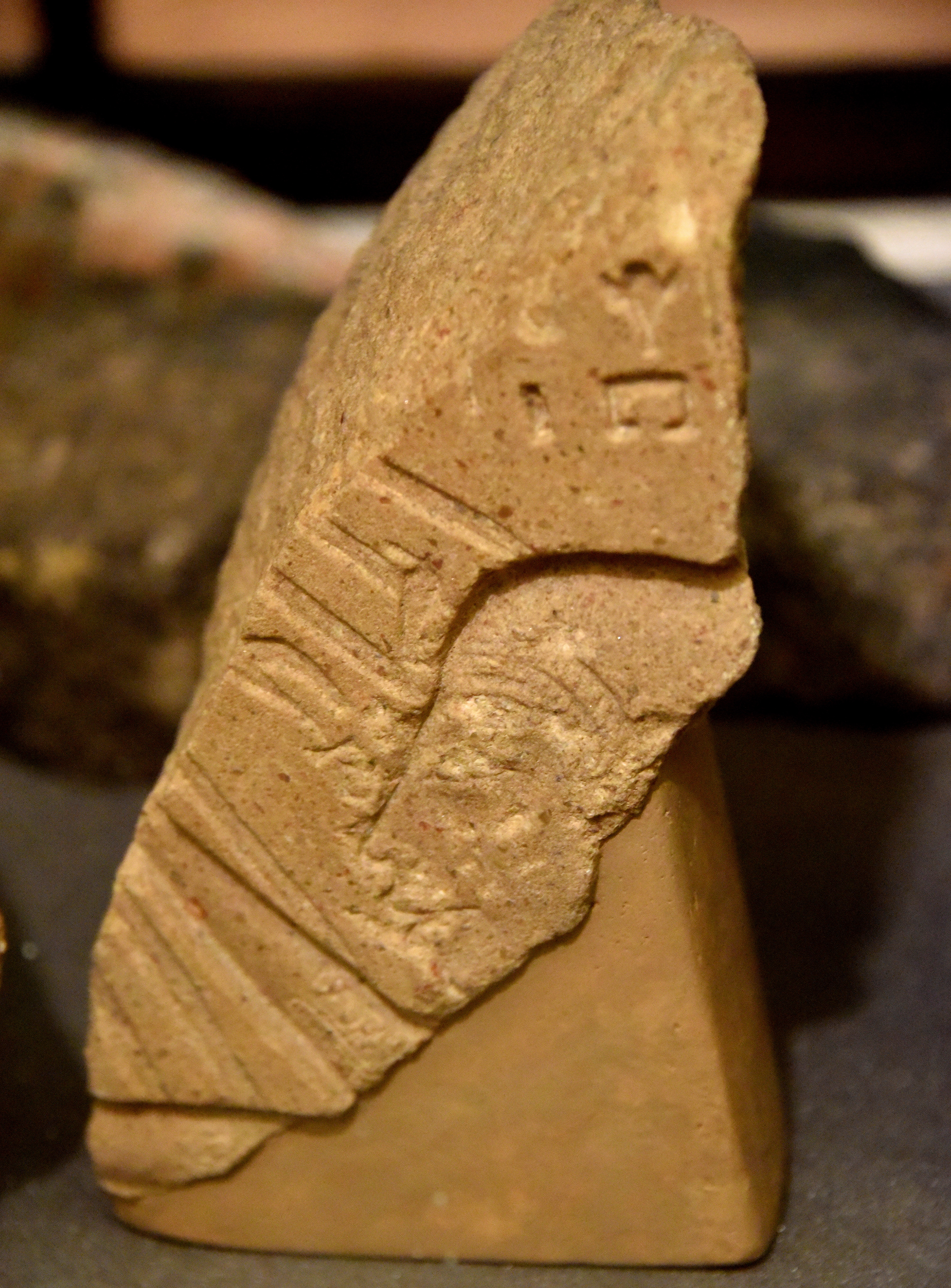
Relief fragment showing a royal head, probably Akhenaten, and early Aten cartouches. Aten extends Ankh (sign of life) to the figure. Reign of Akhenaten. From Amarna, Egypt. Petrie Museum, London.

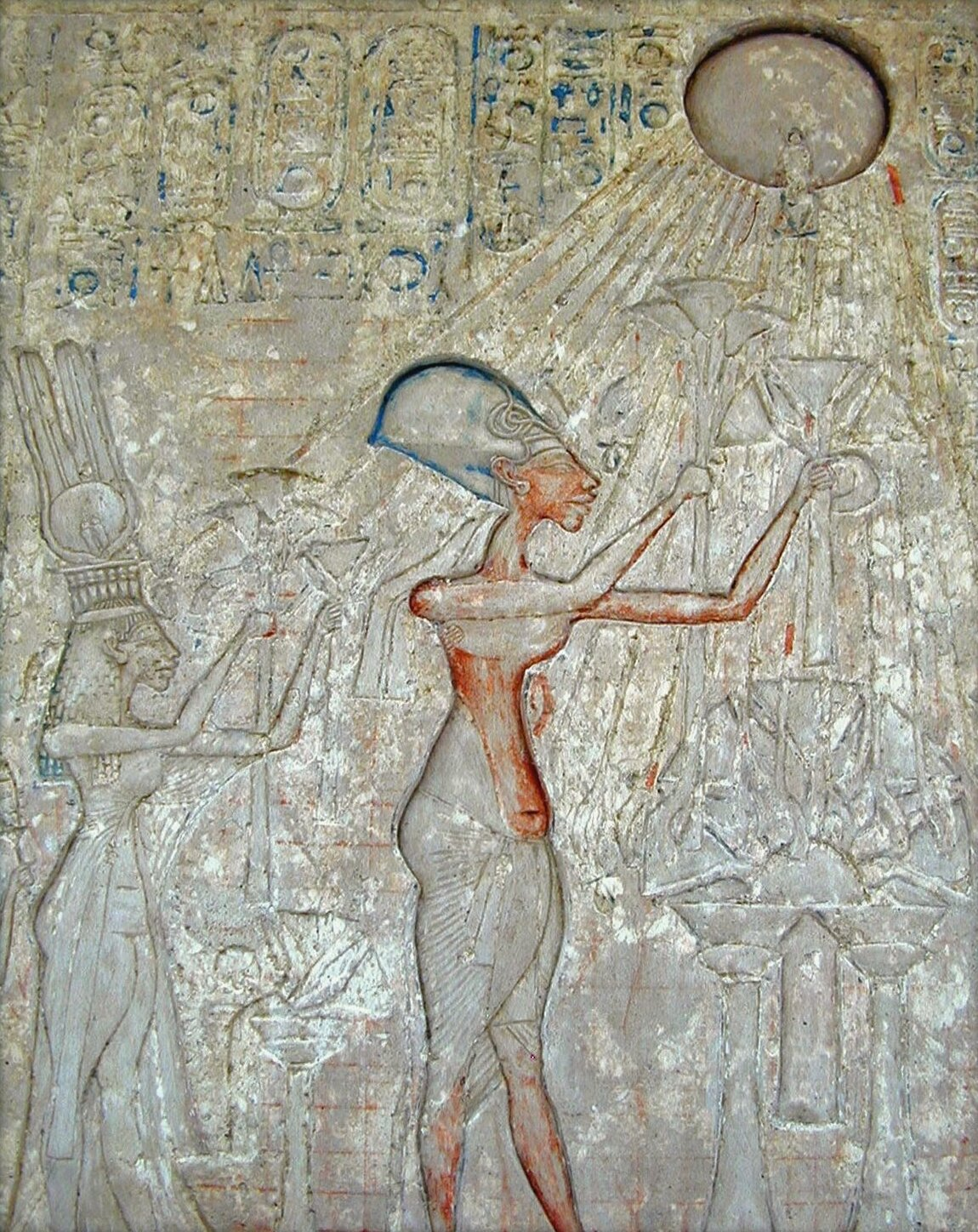
Pharaoh Akhenaten (center) and his family worshiping the Aten, with characteristic rays seen emanating from the solar disk. Later such imagery was prohibited.

Egyptians worshipped a sun god under several names, and solar worship had been growing in popularity even before Akhenaten, especially during the Eighteenth Dynasty and the reign of Amenhotep III, Akhenaten's father. During the New Kingdom, the pharaoh started to be associated with the sun disc; for example, one inscription called the pharaoh Hatshepsut the "female Re shining like the Disc", while Amenhotep III was described as "he who rises over every foreign land, Nebmare, the dazzling disc". During the Eighteenth Dynasty, a religious hymn to the sun also appeared and became popular among Egyptians. However, Egyptologists question whether there is a causal relationship between the cult of the sun disc before Akhenaten and Akhenaten's religious policies. Amenhotep III himself adopted the royal epithet "Aten-Tjehen", which means "the Dazzling Sun Disk", in his 30th Regnal Year, showing his increased interest in the Aten god and elevated it from a minor god to the solar disc by giving it royal patronage. He also named his youngest daughter by his great royal wife Tiye with the name Beketaten meaning 'Handmaid of Aten'. However, Amenhotep III did not promote the Aten as an exclusive god in his own reign and his main religious devotion was still towards Amun-Ra, a combination of Thebes' deity Amun and the northern Egyptian sun god Ra in his reign.

=== Implementation and development ===
The implementation of Atenism can be traced through gradual changes in the Aten's iconography, and Egyptologist Donald Redford divided its development into three stages—earliest, intermediate, and final—in his studies of Akhenaten and Atenism. The earliest stage was associated with a growing number of depictions of the sun disc, though the disc is still seen resting on the head of the falcon-headed sun god Ra-Horakhty, as the god was traditionally represented. The god was only "unique but not exclusive". The intermediate stage was marked by the elevation of the Aten above other gods and the appearance of cartouches around his inscribed name—cartouches traditionally indicating that the enclosed text is a royal name. The final stage had the Aten represented as a sun disc with sunrays like long arms terminating in human hands and the introduction of a new epithet for the god: "the great living Disc which is in jubilee, lord of heaven and earth".

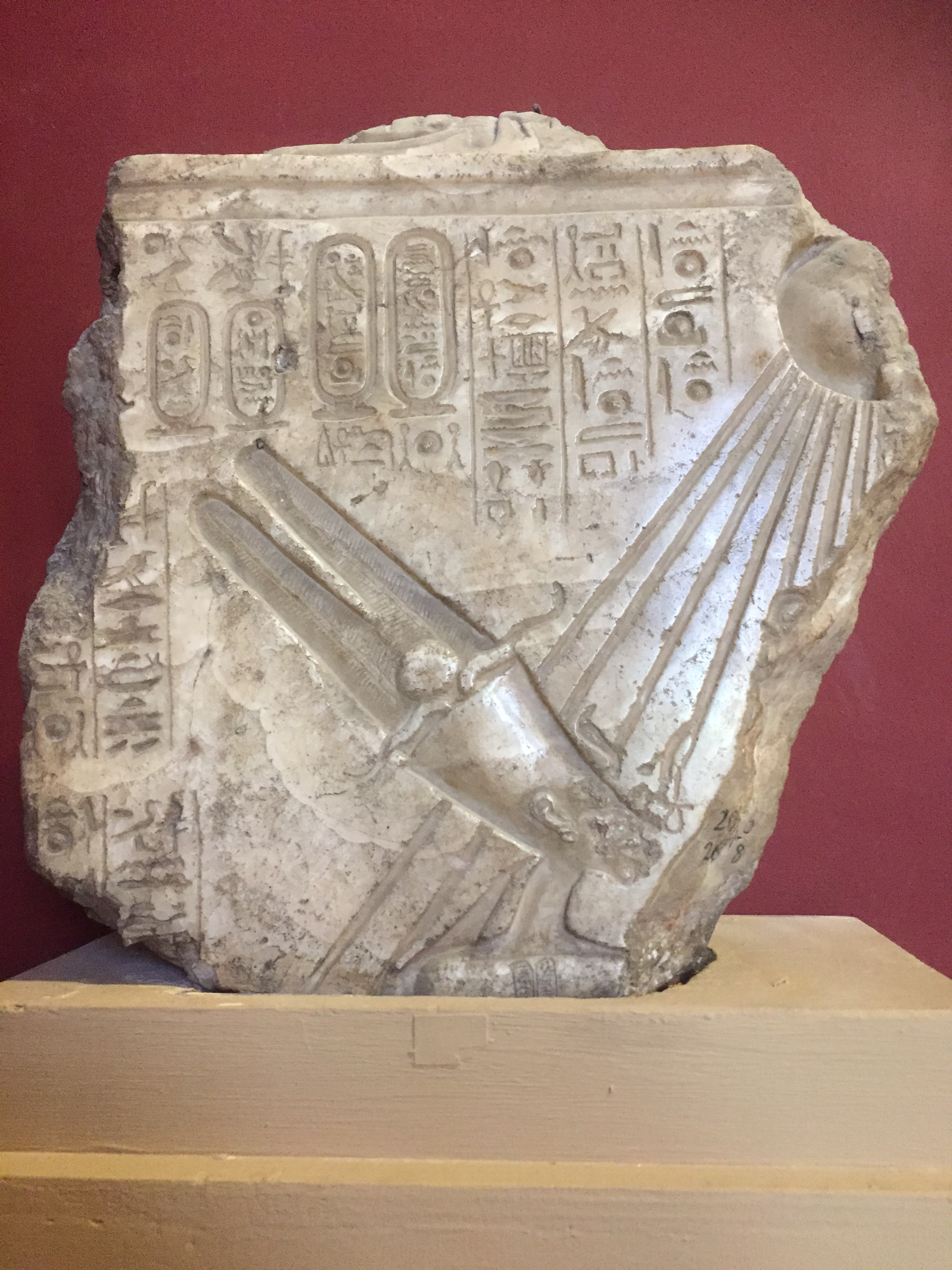
Alabaster relief depicting Akhenaten under the rays of the Aten. He wears a tall crown topped with rams horns, a solar disc, and two tall feathers. Displayed in the Egyptian Museum, Cairo.

In the early years of his reign, Amenhotep IV lived at Thebes, the old capital city, and permitted worship of Egypt's traditional deities to continue. However, some signs already pointed to the growing importance of the Aten. For example, inscriptions in the Theban tomb of Parennefer from the early rule of Amenhotep IV state that "one measures the payments to every (other) god with a level measure, but for the Aten one measures so that it overflows," indicating a more favorable attitude to the cult of Aten than the other gods. Additionally, near the Temple of Karnak, Amun-Ra's great cult center, Amenhotep IV erected several massive buildings including temples to the Aten. The new Aten temples had no roof and the god was thus worshipped in the sunlight, under the open sky, rather than in dark temple enclosures as had been the previous custom. The Theban buildings were later dismantled by his successors and used as infill for new constructions in the Temple of Karnak; when they were later dismantled by archaeologists, some 36,000 decorated blocks from the original Aten building here were revealed that preserve many elements of the original relief scenes and inscriptions.

One of the most important turning points in the early reign of Amenhotep IV is a speech given by the pharaoh at the beginning of his second regnal year. A copy of the speech survives on one of the pylons at the Karnak Temple Complex near Thebes. Speaking to the royal court, scribes or the people, Amenhotep IV said that the gods were ineffective and had ceased their movements, and that their temples had collapsed. The pharaoh contrasted this with the only remaining god, the sun disc Aten, who continued to move and exist forever. Some Egyptologists, such as Donald Redford, compared this speech to a proclamation or manifesto, which foreshadowed and explained the pharaoh's later religious reforms centered around the Aten. In his speech, Akhenaten said:

The temples of the gods fallen to ruin, their bodies do not endure. Since the time of the ancestors, it is the wise man that knows these things. Behold, I, the king, am speaking so that I might inform you concerning the appearances of the gods. I know their temples, and I am versed in the writings, specifically, the inventory of their primeval bodies. And I have watched as they [the gods] have ceased their appearances, one after the other. All of them have stopped, except the god who gave birth to himself. And no one knows the mystery of how he performs his tasks. This god goes where he pleases and no one else knows his going. I approach him, the things which he has made. How exalted they are.

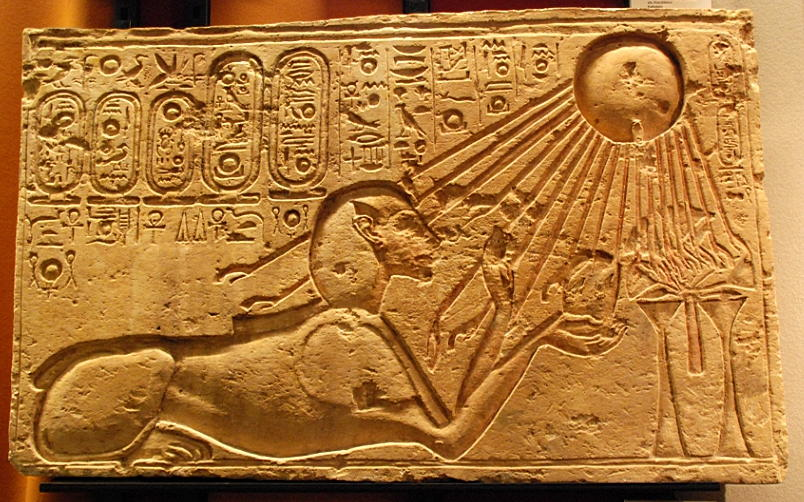
Akhenaten depicted as a sphinx at Amarna

In Year Five of his reign, Amenhotep IV took decisive steps to establish the Aten as the sole god of Egypt. The pharaoh "disbanded the priesthoods of all the other gods ... and diverted the income from these [other] cults to support the Aten." To emphasize his complete allegiance to the Aten, the king officially changed his name from Amenhotep IV to Akhenaten (Ancient Egyptian: ꜣḫ-n-jtn, meaning "Effective for the Aten"). Meanwhile, the Aten was becoming a king itself. Artists started to depict him with the trappings of pharaohs, placing his name in cartouches—a rare, but not unique occurrence, as the names of Ra-Horakhty and Amun-Ra had also been found enclosed in cartouches—and wearing a uraeus, a symbol of kingship. The Aten may also have been the subject of Akhenaten's royal Sed festival early in the pharaoh's reign. With Aten becoming a sole deity, Akhenaten started to proclaim himself as the only intermediary between Aten and his people, and the subject of their personal worship and attention—a feature not unheard of in Egyptian history, with Fifth Dynasty pharaohs such as Ini proclaiming to be sole intermediaries between the people and the gods Osiris and Ra.

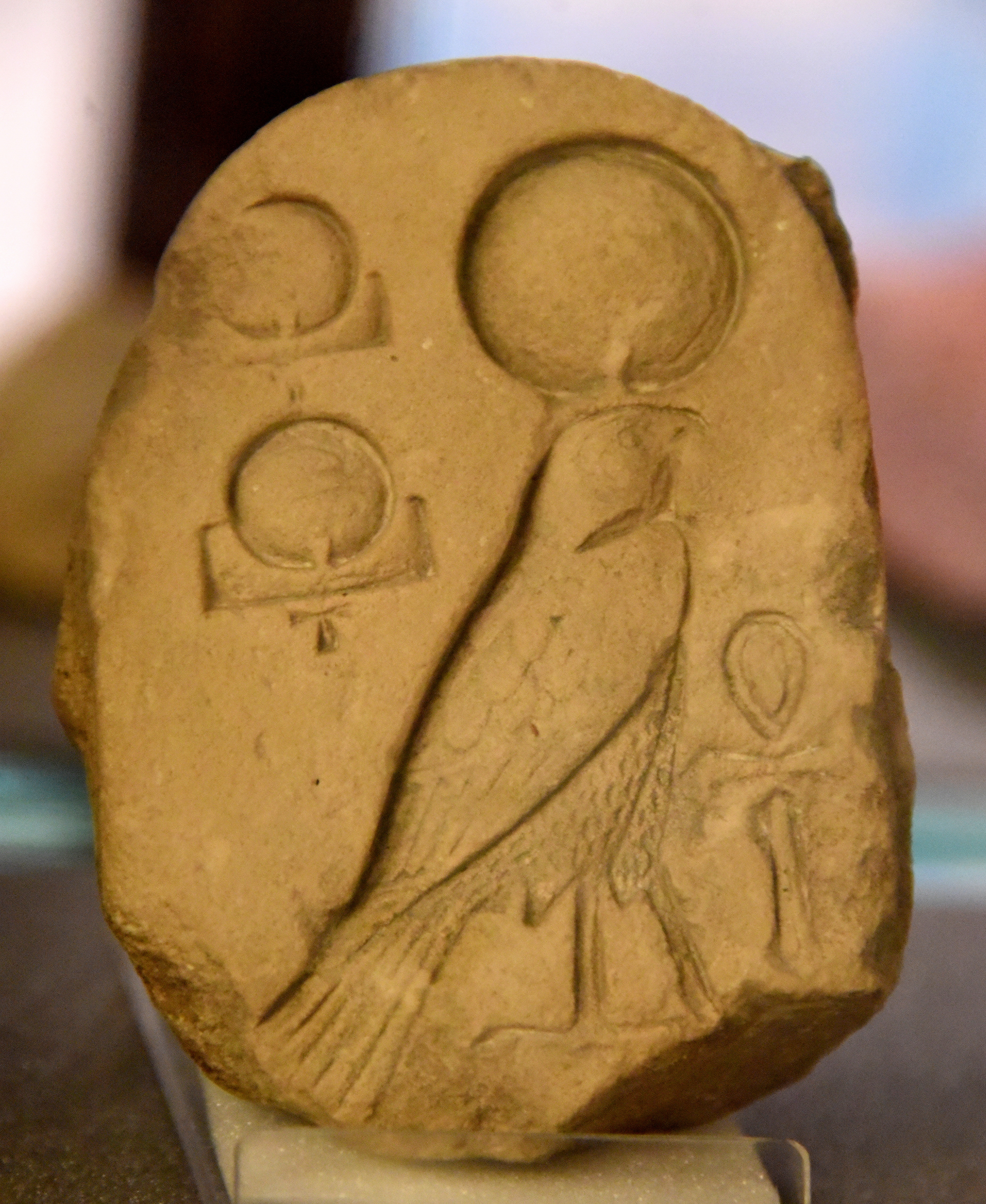
Inscribed limestone fragment showing early Aten cartouches, "the Living Ra Horakhty". Reign of Akhenaten. From Amarna, Egypt. Petrie Museum, London.

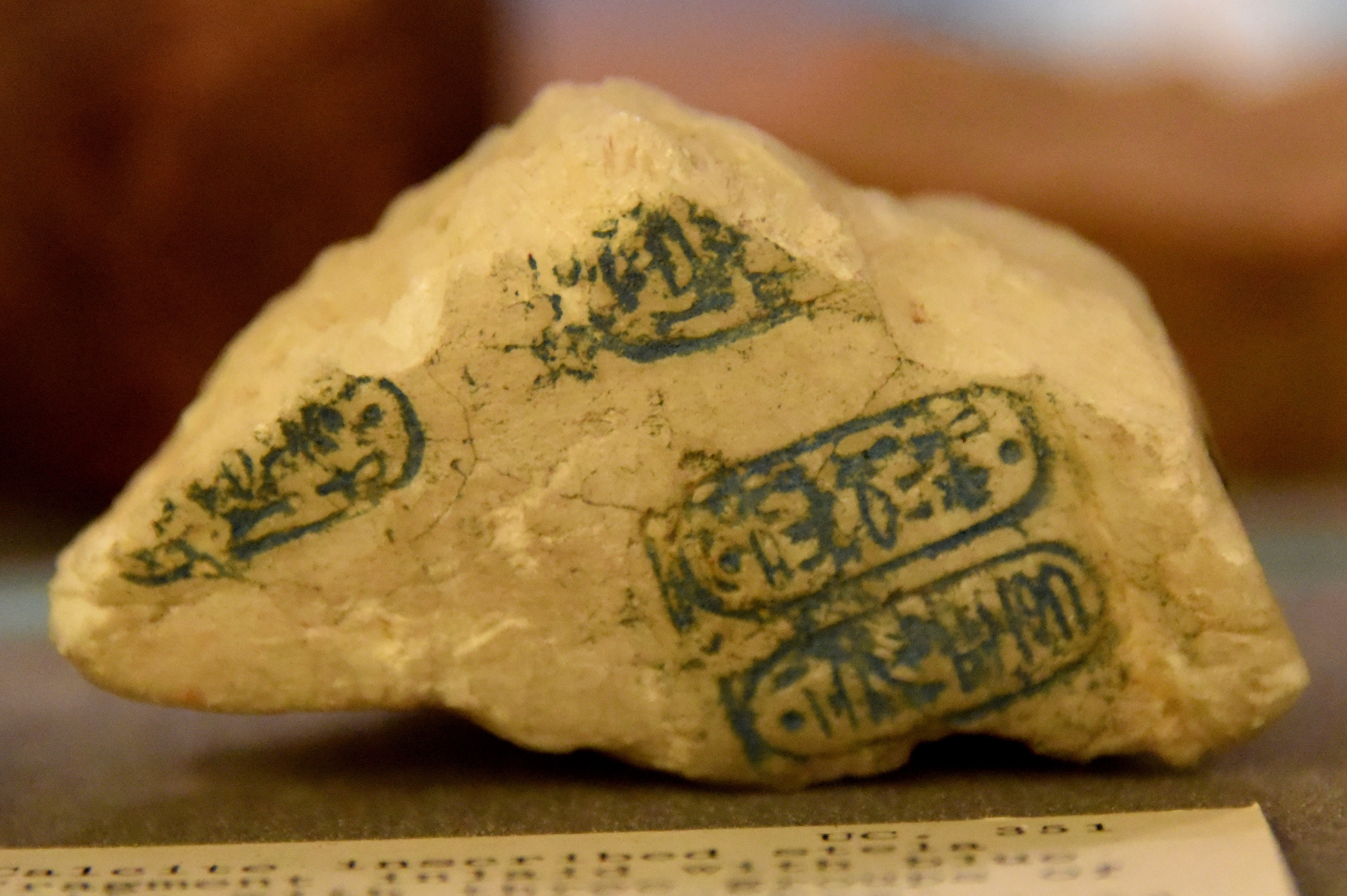
Fragment of a stela, showing parts of three late cartouches of Aten. There is a rare intermediate form of god's name. Reign of Akhenaten. From Amarna, Egypt. Petrie Museum, London.

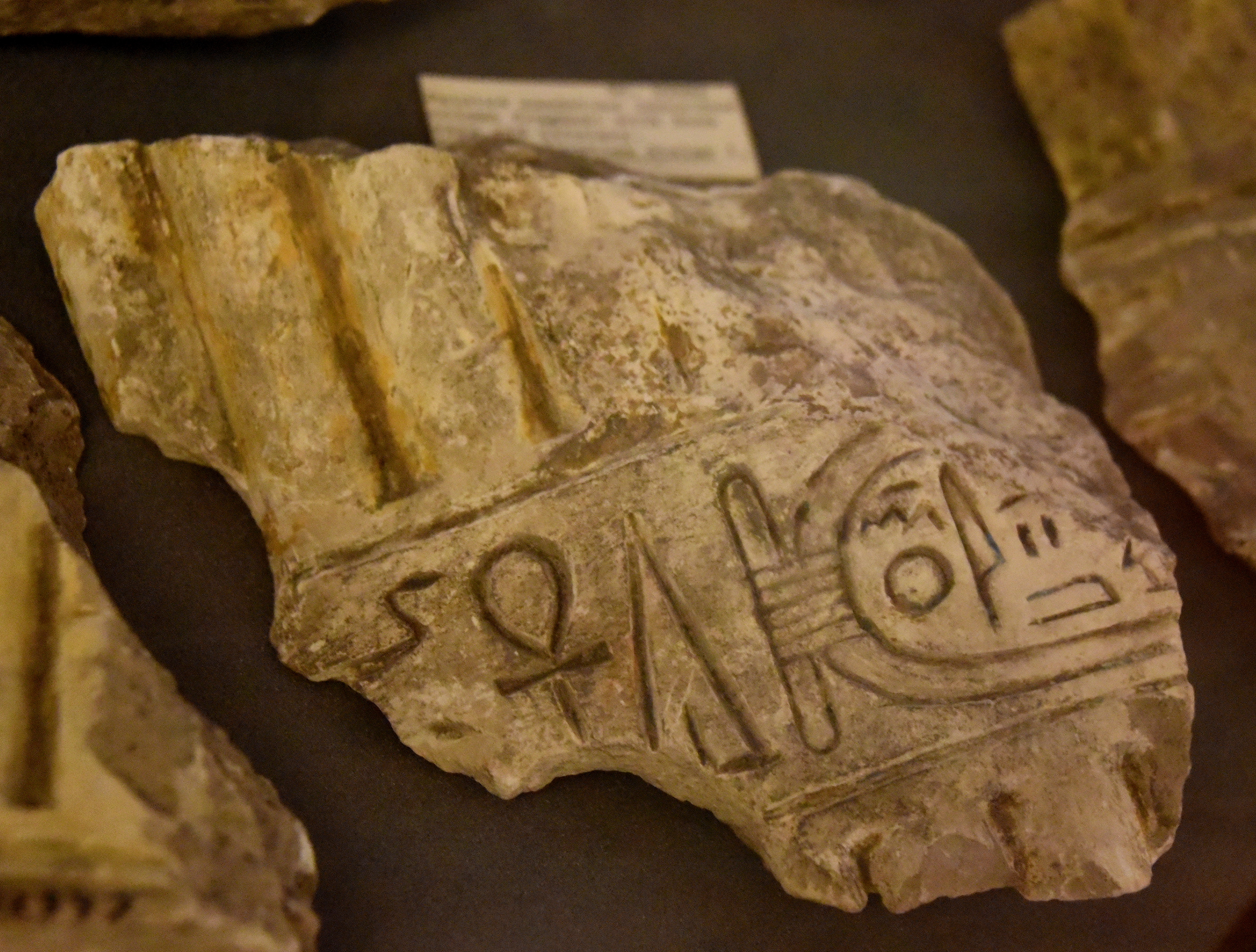
Limestone fragment column showing reeds and an early Aten cartouche. Reign of Akhenaten. From Amarna, Egypt. The Petrie Museum of Egyptian Archaeology, London.

By Year Nine of his reign, Akhenaten declared that Aten was not merely the supreme god, but the only worshipable god. He ordered the defacing of Amun's temples throughout Egypt and, in a number of instances, inscriptions of the plural 'gods' were also removed. This emphasized the changes encouraged by the new regime, which included a ban on images, with the exception of a rayed solar disc, in which the rays appear to represent the unseen spirit of Aten, who by then was evidently considered not merely a sun god, but rather a universal deity. All life on Earth depended on the Aten and the visible sunlight. Representations of the Aten were always accompanied with a sort of hieroglyphic footnote, stating that the representation of the sun as all-encompassing creator was to be taken as just that: a representation of something that, by its very nature as something transcending creation, cannot be fully or adequately represented by any one part of that creation. Aten's name was also written differently starting as early as Year Eight or as late as Year 14, according to some historians. From "Living Re-Horakhty, who rejoices in the horizon in his name Shu-Re who is in Aten", the god's name changed to "Living Re, ruler of the horizon, who rejoices in his name of Re the father who has returned as Aten", removing the Aten's connection to Re-Horakhty and Shu, two other solar deities. The Aten thus became an amalgamation that incorporated the attributes and beliefs around Re-Horakhty, universal sun god, and Shu, god of the sky and manifestation of the sunlight.

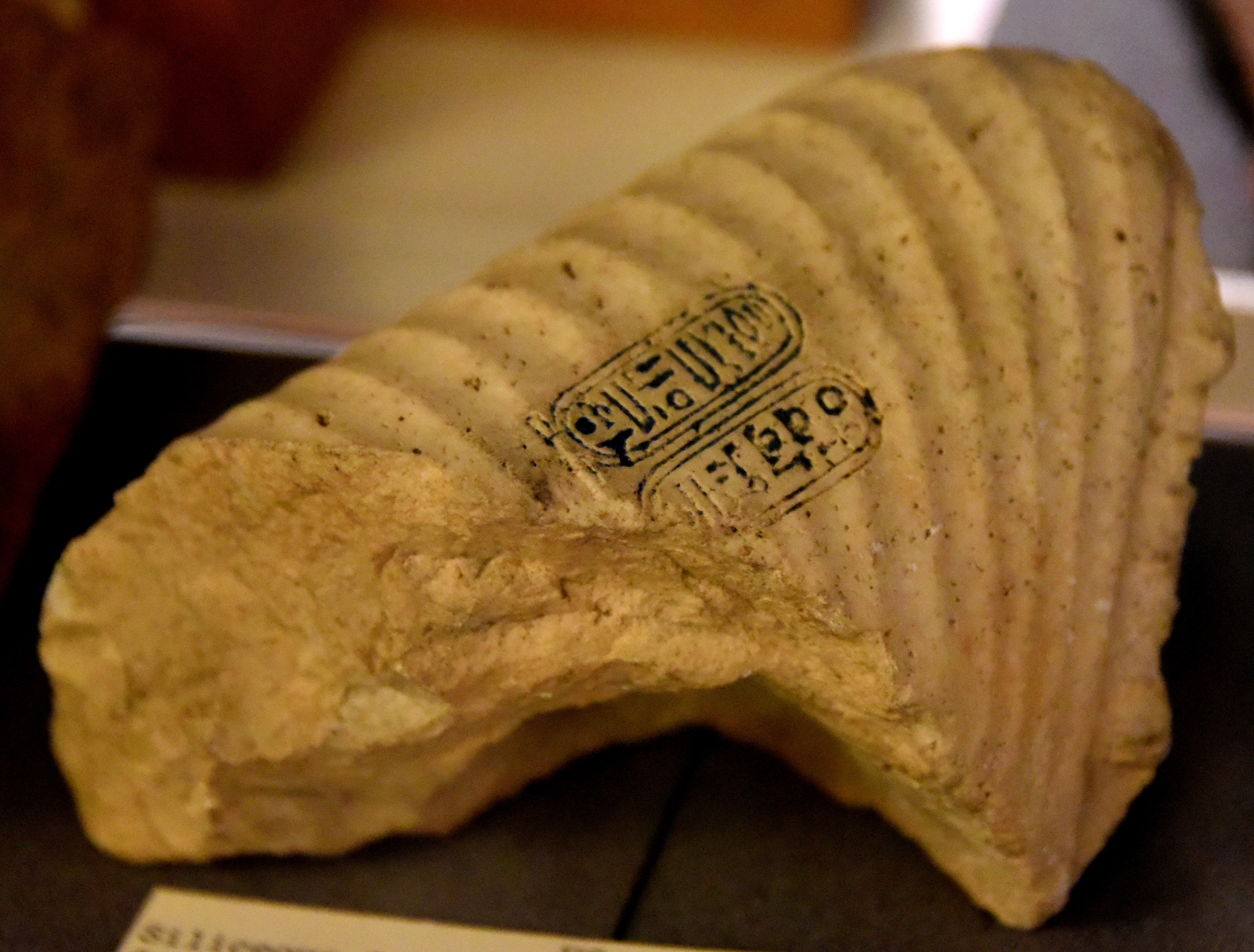
Siliceous limestone fragment of a statue. There are late Aten cartouches on the draped right shoulder. Reign of Akhenaten. From Amarna, Egypt. Petrie Museum, London.

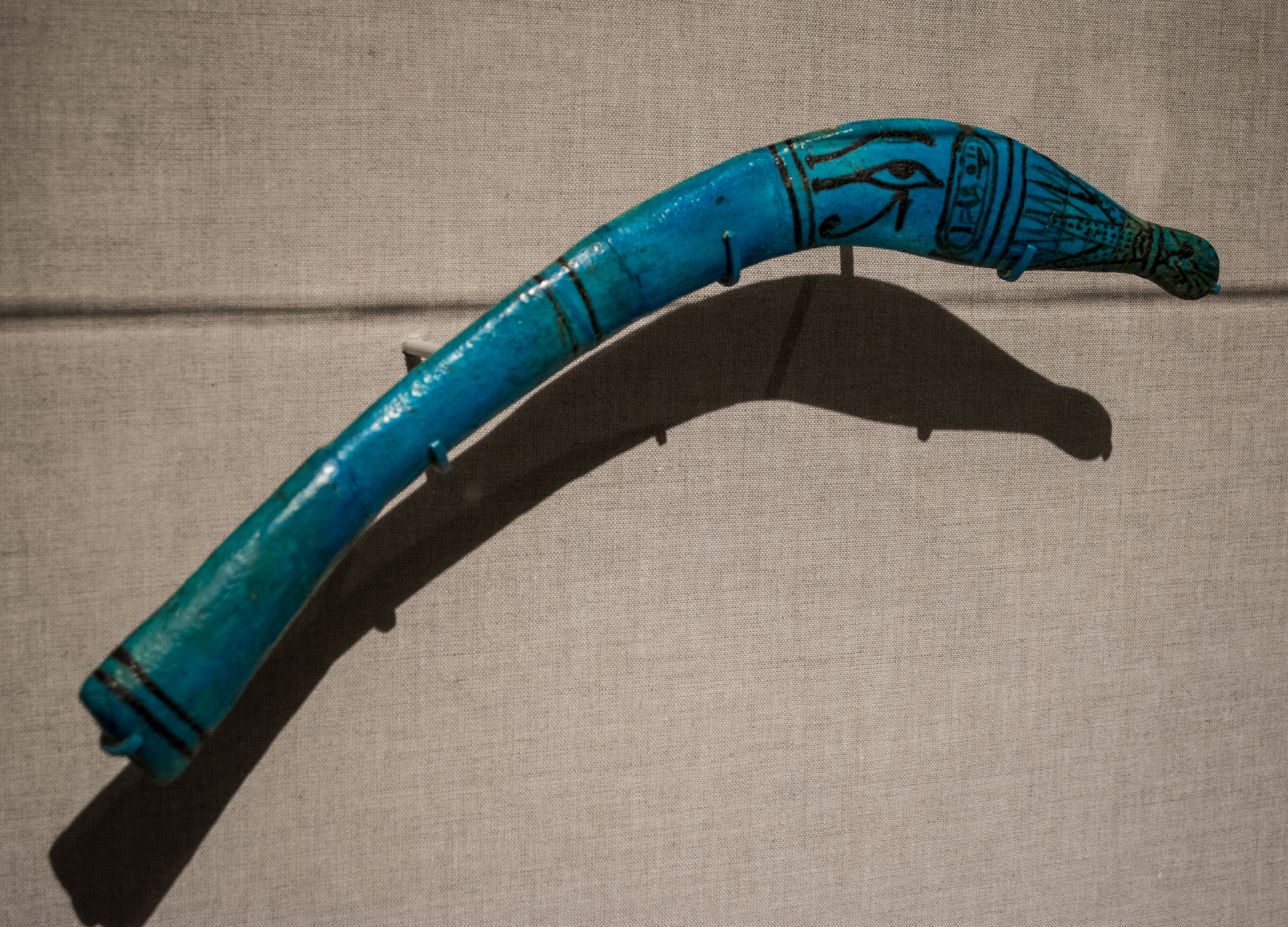
A "blue faience" magical throwstick belonging to Akhenaten found at Amarna

Akhenaten's Atenist beliefs are best distilled in the Great Hymn to the Aten. The hymn was discovered in the tomb of Ay, one of Akhenaten's successors, though Egyptologists believe that it could have been composed by Akhenaten himself. The hymn celebrates the sun and daylight and recounts the dangers that abound when the sun sets. It tells of the Aten as a sole god and the creator of all life, who recreates life every day at sunrise, and on whom everything on Earth depends, including the natural world, people's lives, and even trade and commerce. In one passage, the hymn declares: "O Sole God beside whom there is none! You made the earth as you wished, you alone." The hymn also states that Akhenaten is the only intermediary between the god and Egyptians, and the only one who can understand the Aten: "You are in my heart, and there is none who knows you except your son."

=== Atenism and other gods ===
Some debate has focused on the extent to which Akhenaten forced his religious reforms on his people. Certainly, as time drew on, he revised the names of the Aten, and other religious language, to increasingly exclude references to other gods; at some point, also, he embarked on the wide-scale erasure of traditional gods' names, especially those of Amun. Some of his court changed their names to remove them from the patronage of other gods and place them under that of Aten (or Ra, with whom Akhenaten equated the Aten). Yet, even at Amarna itself, some courtiers kept such names as Ahmose ("child of the moon god", the owner of tomb 3), and the sculptor's workshop where the famous Nefertiti Bust and other works of royal portraiture were found is associated with an artist known to have been called Thutmose ("child of Thoth"). An overwhelmingly large number of faience amulets at Amarna also show that talismans of the household-and-childbirth gods Bes and Taweret, the eye of Horus, and amulets of other traditional deities, were openly worn by its citizens. Indeed, a cache of royal jewelry found buried near the Amarna royal tombs (now in the National Museum of Scotland) includes a finger ring referring to Mut, the wife of Amun. Such evidence suggests that though Akhenaten shifted funding away from traditional temples, his policies were fairly tolerant until some point, perhaps a particular event as yet unknown, toward the end of the reign.

Archaeological discoveries at Akhetaten show that many ordinary residents of this city chose to gouge or chisel out all references to the god Amun on even minor personal items that they owned, such as commemorative scarabs or make-up pots, perhaps for fear of being accused of having Amunist sympathies. References to Amenhotep III, Akhenaten's father, were partly erased since they contained the traditional Amun form of his name: Nebmaatre Amunhotep.

=== After Akhenaten ===
Following Akhenaten's death, Egypt gradually returned to its traditional polytheistic religion, partly because of how closely associated the Aten became with Akhenaten. Atenism likely stayed dominant through the reigns of Akhenaten's immediate successors, Smenkhkare and Neferneferuaten, as well as early in the reign of Tutankhaten. For some years the worship of Aten and a resurgent worship of Amun coexisted. A key reason the cult of Aten failed under Akhenaten was "due to its lack of afterlife beliefs. The traditional Osirian cult offered an opportunity for Egyptians to access an idealised vision of one’s life on Earth after they had died in the Field of Reeds or A’Aru. This was replaced with a continued existence in the present."

Over time, however, Akhenaten's successors, starting with Tutankhaten, took steps to distance themselves from Atenism. Tutankhaten and his wife Ankhesenpaaten dropped the Aten from their names and changed them to Tutankhamun and Ankhesenamun, respectively. Amun was restored as the supreme deity. Tutankhamun reestablished the temples of the other gods, as the pharaoh propagated on his Restoration Stela: "He reorganized this land, restoring its customs to those of the time of Re. ... He renewed the gods' mansions and fashioned all their images. ... He raised up their temples and created their statues. ... When he had sought out the gods' precincts which were in ruins in this land, he refounded them just as they had been since the time of the first primeval age." Additionally, Tutankhamun's building projects at Thebes and Karnak used talatat's from Akhenaten's buildings, which implies that Tutankhamun might have started to demolish temples dedicated to the Aten.

Aten temples continued to be torn down under Ay and Horemheb, Tutankhamun's successors and the last pharaohs of the Eighteenth Dynasty. Horemheb had Akhenaten's statues destroyed and his name erased, with later dynasties subsequently calling Akhenaten "the enemy of Akhetaten". Horemheb might also have ordered the demolition of Akhetaten, Akhenaten's capital city. Further underlining the break with Aten worship, Horemheb claimed to have been chosen to rule by the god Horus. Finally, Seti I, the second pharaoh of the Nineteenth Dynasty, ordered the name of Amun to be restored on inscriptions where it had been removed or replaced by Aten. Amun's name was still being restored by the time of the reign of Ramesses II.

== Artistic depictions ==
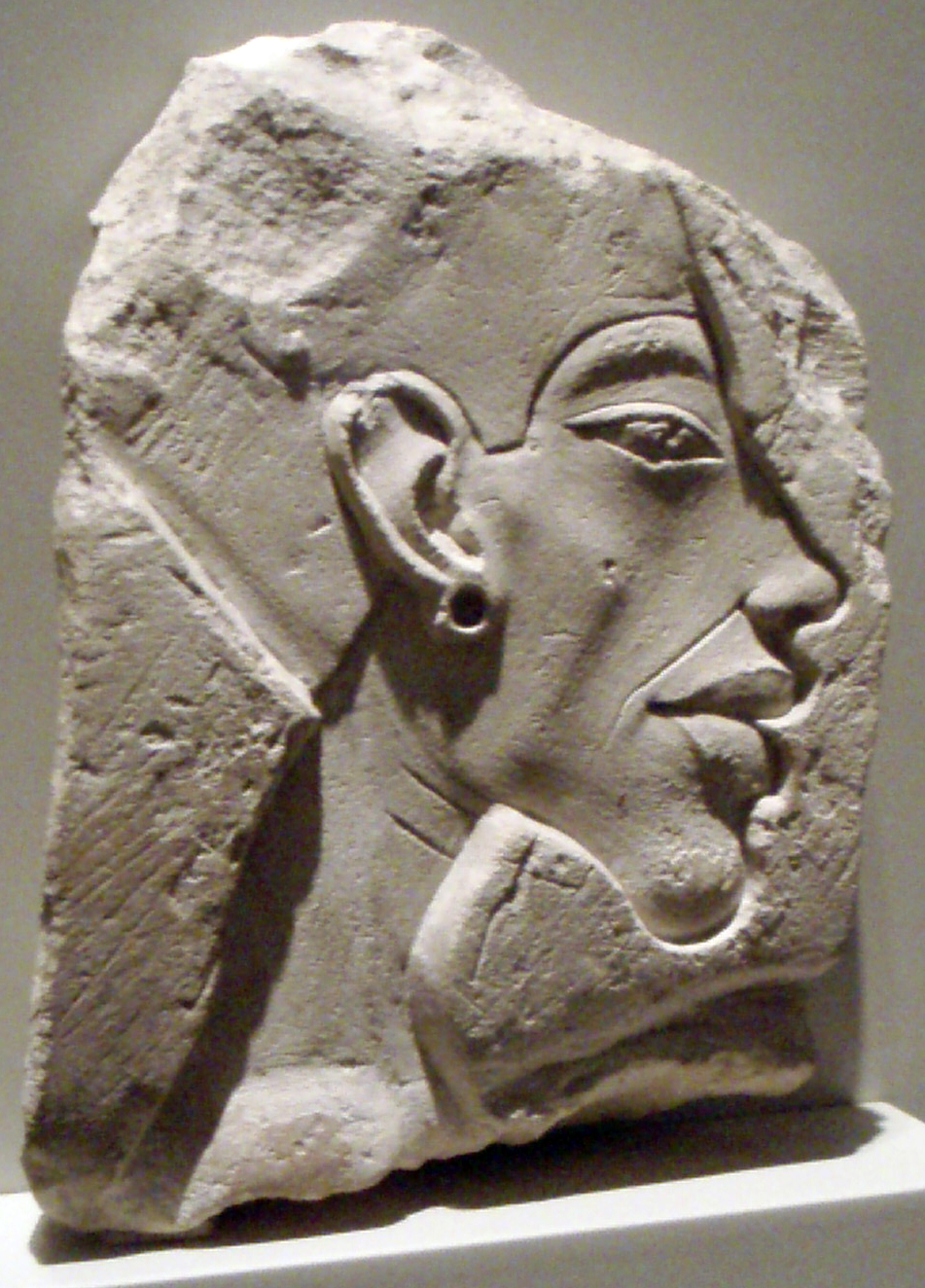
Akhenaten in the typical Amarna period style

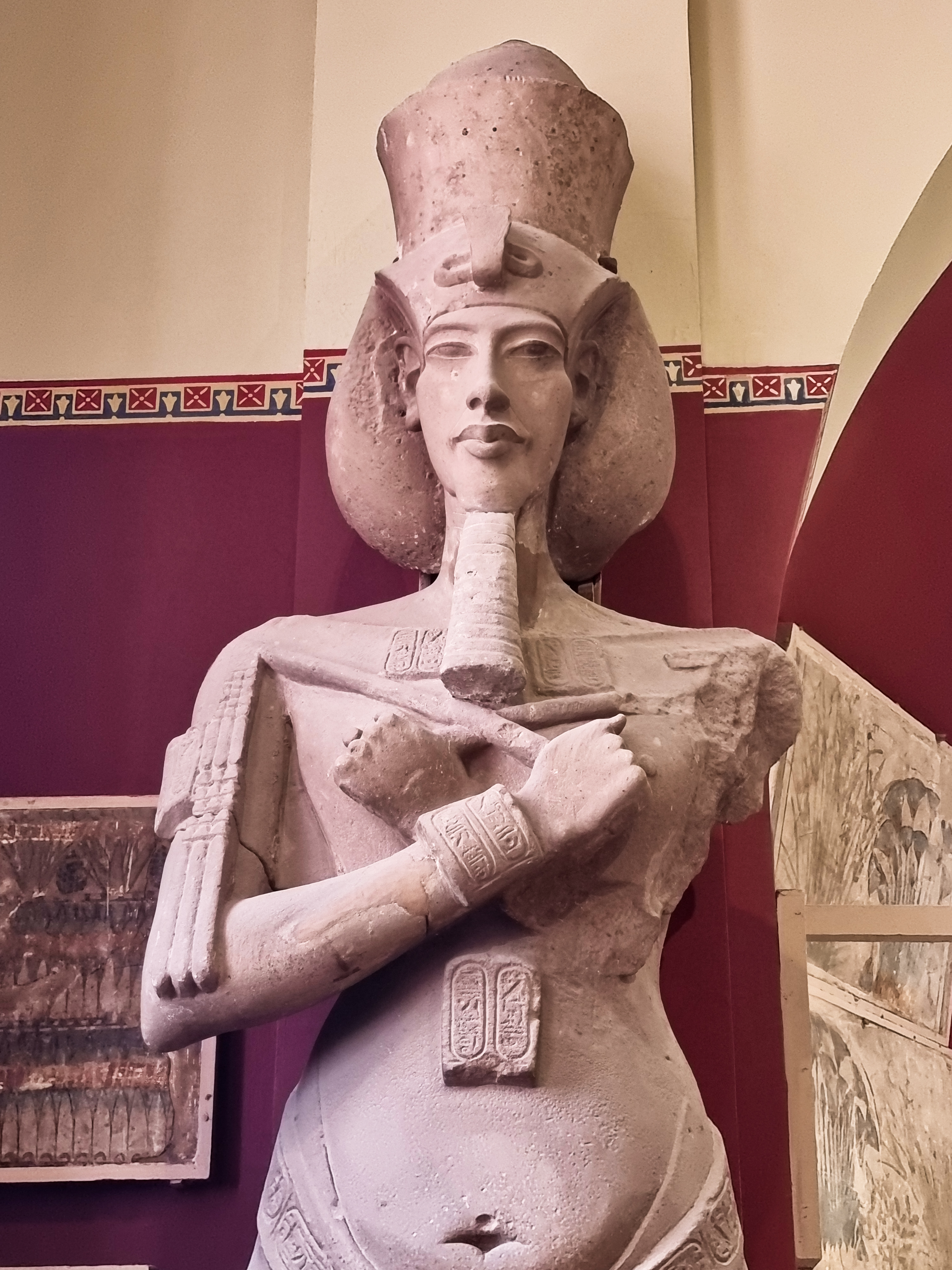
Statue of Akhenaten in the collection of the Egyptian Museum, Cairo

Styles of art that flourished during the reigns of Akhenaten and his immediate successors, known as Amarna art, are markedly different from the traditional art of ancient Egypt. Representations are more realistic, expressionistic, and naturalistic, especially in depictions of animals, plants and people, and convey more action and movement for both non-royal and royal individuals than the traditionally static representations. In traditional art, a pharaoh's divine nature was expressed by repose, even immobility.

The portrayals of Akhenaten himself greatly differ from the depictions of other pharaohs. Traditionally, the portrayal of pharaohs—and the Egyptian ruling class—was idealized, and they were shown in "stereotypically 'beautiful' fashion" as youthful and athletic. However, Akhenaten's portrayals are unconventional and "unflattering" with a sagging stomach; broad hips; thin legs; thick thighs; large, "almost feminine breasts"; a thin, "exaggeratedly long face"; and thick lips.

Based on Akhenaten's and his family's unusual artistic representations, including potential depictions of gynecomastia and androgyny, some have argued that the pharaoh and his family have either had aromatase excess syndrome and sagittal craniosynostosis syndrome, or Antley–Bixler syndrome. In 2010, results published from genetic studies on Akhenaten's purported mummy did not find signs of gynecomastia or Antley-Bixler syndrome, although these results have since been questioned.

Arguing instead for a symbolic interpretation, Dominic Montserrat in Akhenaten: History, Fantasy and Ancient Egypt states that "there is now a broad consensus among Egyptologists that the exaggerated forms of Akhenaten's physical portrayal... are not to be read literally". Because the god Aten was referred to as "the mother and father of all humankind", Montserrat and others suggest that Akhenaten was made to look androgynous in artwork as a symbol of the androgyny of the Aten. This required "a symbolic gathering of all the attributes of the creator god into the physical body of the king himself", which will "display on earth the Aten's multiple life-giving functions". Akhenaten claimed the title "The Unique One of Re", and he may have directed his artists to contrast him with the common people through a radical departure from the idealized traditional pharaoh image.

Depictions of other members of the court, especially members of the royal family, are also exaggerated, stylized, and overall different from traditional art. Significantly, and for the only time in the history of Egyptian royal art, the pharaoh's family life is depicted: the royal family is shown mid-action in relaxed, casual, and intimate situations, taking part in decidedly naturalistic activities, showing affection for each other, such as holding hands and kissing.

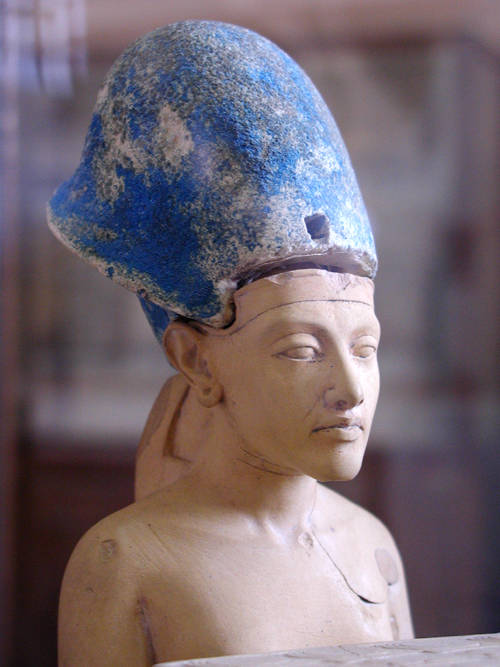
Small statue of Akhenaten wearing the Blue Crown

Nefertiti also appears, both beside the king and alone, or with her daughters, in actions usually reserved for a pharaoh, such as "smiting the enemy", a traditional depiction of male pharaohs. This suggests that she enjoyed unusual status for a queen. Early artistic representations of her tend to be indistinguishable from her husband's except by her regalia, but soon after the move to the new capital, Nefertiti begins to be depicted with features specific to her. Questions remain whether the beauty of Nefertiti is portraiture or idealism.

== Speculative theories ==
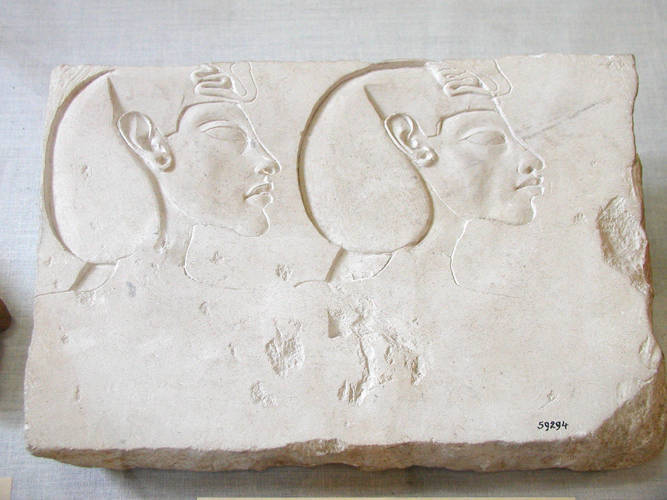
Sculptor's trial piece of Akhenaten

Akhenaten's status as a religious revolutionary has led to much speculation, ranging from scholarly hypotheses to non-academic fringe theories. Although some believe the religion he introduced was mostly monotheistic, many others see Akhenaten as a practitioner of an Aten monolatry, as he did not actively deny the existence of other gods; he simply refrained from worshiping any but the Aten.

=== Akhenaten and monotheism in Abrahamic religions ===
The idea that Akhenaten was the pioneer of a monotheistic religion that later became Judaism has been considered by various scholars. One of the first to mention this was Sigmund Freud, the founder of psychoanalysis, in his book Moses and Monotheism. Basing his arguments on his belief that the Exodus story was historical, Freud argued that Moses had been an Atenist priest who was forced to leave Egypt with his followers after Akhenaten's death. Freud argued that Akhenaten was striving to promote monotheism, something that the biblical Moses was able to achieve. Following the publication of his book, the concept entered popular consciousness and serious research.

There are strong similarities between Akhenaten's Great Hymn to the Aten and the Biblical Psalm 104, but there is debate as to relationship implied by this similarity.

Others have likened some aspects of Akhenaten's relationship with the Aten to the relationship, in Christian tradition, between Jesus Christ and God, particularly interpretations that emphasize a more monotheistic interpretation of Atenism than a henotheistic one. Donald B. Redford has noted that some have viewed Akhenaten as a harbinger of Jesus. "After all, Akhenaten did call himself the son of the sole god: 'Thine only son that came forth from thy body'." James Henry Breasted likened him to Jesus, Arthur Weigall saw him as a failed precursor of Christ and Thomas Mann saw him "as right on the way and yet not the right one for the way".

Although scholars like Brian Fagan (2015) and Robert Alter (2018) have re-opened the debate, in 1997, Redford concluded:

Before much of the archaeological evidence from Thebes and from Tell el-Amarna became available, wishful thinking sometimes turned Akhenaten into a humane teacher of the true God, a mentor of Moses, a christlike figure, a philosopher before his time. But these imaginary creatures are now fading away as the historical reality gradually emerges. There is little or no evidence to support the notion that Akhenaten was a progenitor of the full-blown monotheism that we find in the Bible. The monotheism of the Hebrew Bible and the New Testament had its own separate development—one that began more than half a millennium after the pharaoh's death.

=== Possible illness ===
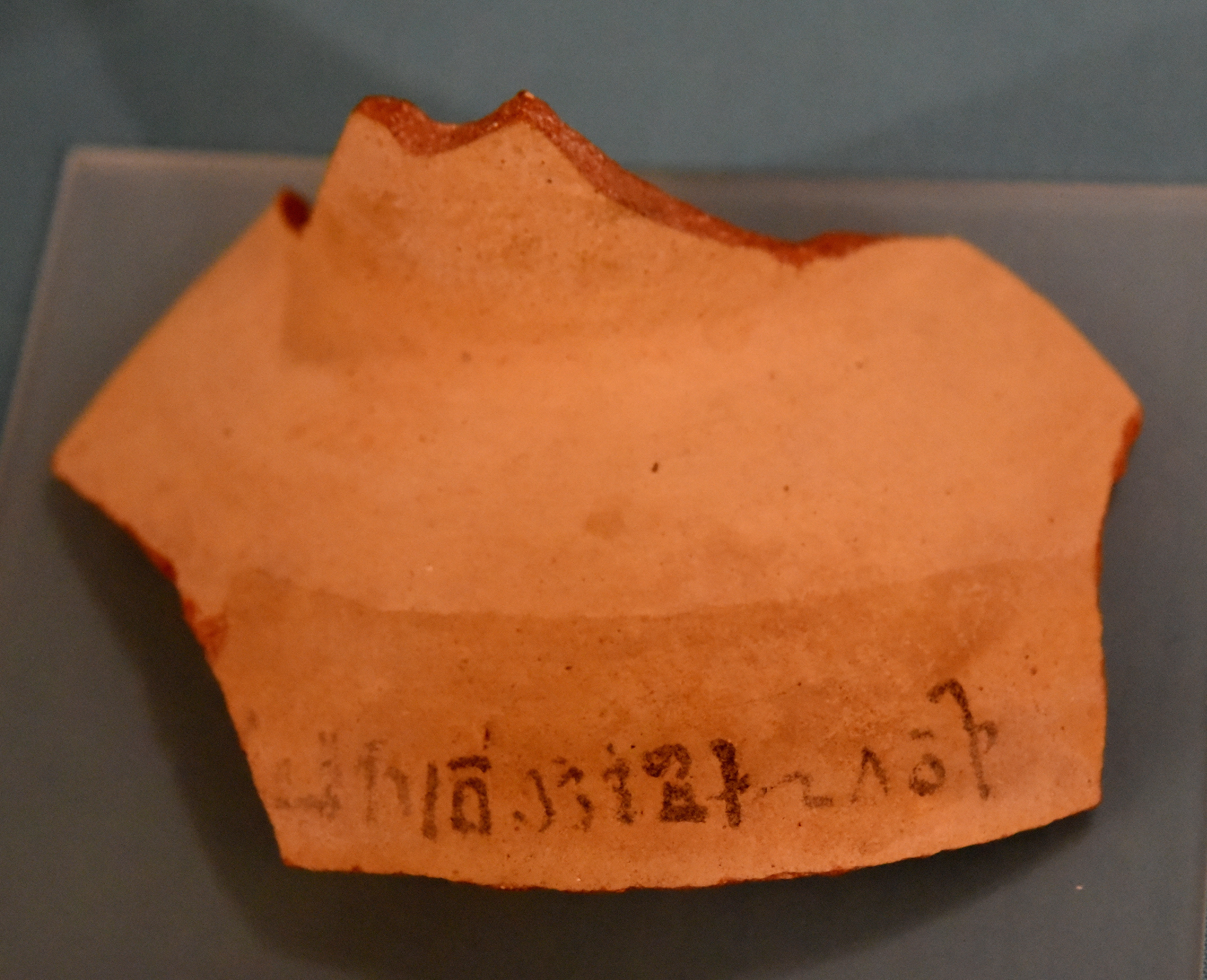
Hieratic inscription on a pottery fragment. It records year 17 of Akhenaten's reign and references wine of the house of Aten. From Amarna, Egypt. Petrie Museum, London.

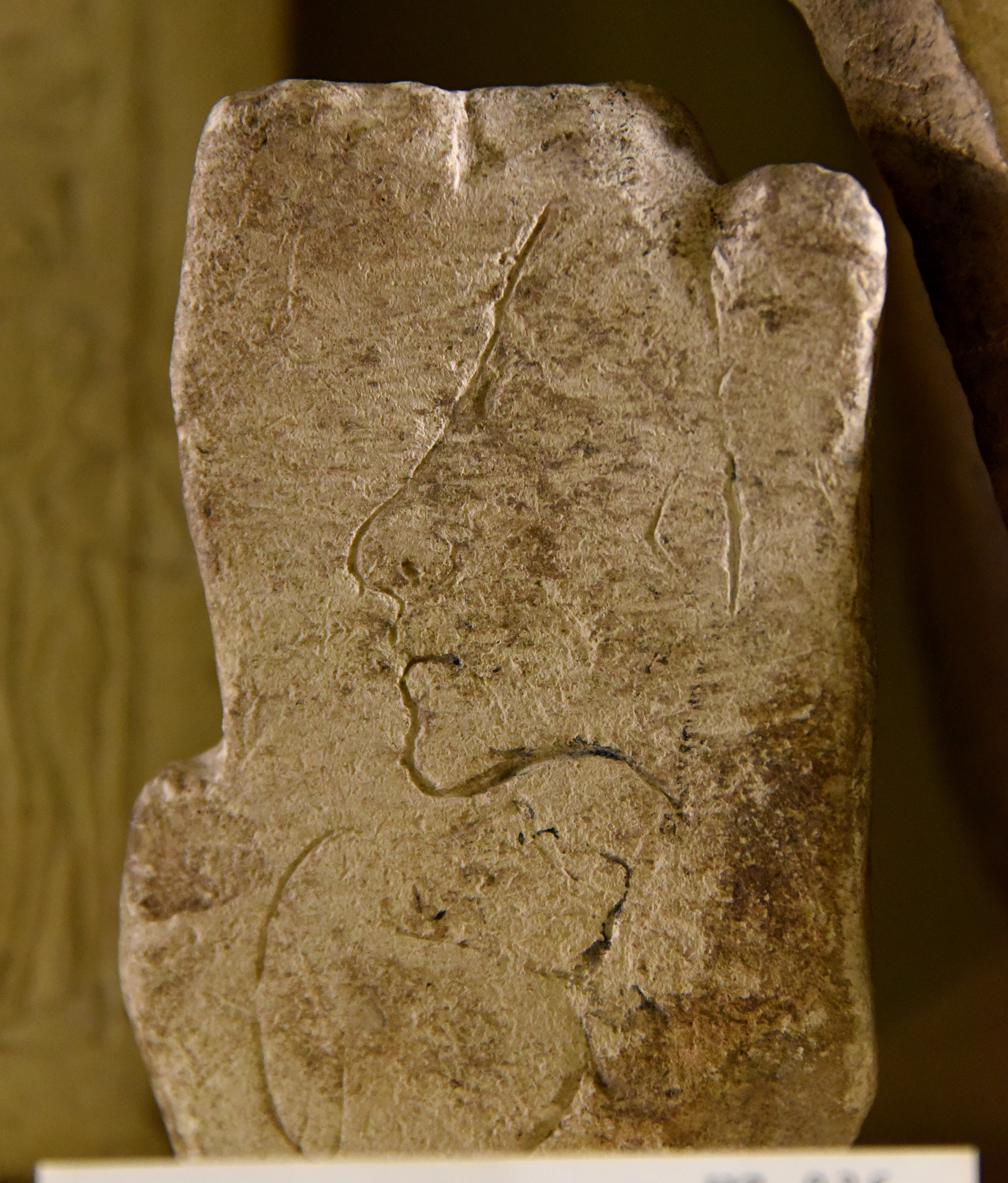
Limestone trial piece of a king, probably Akhenaten, and a smaller head of uncertain gender. From Amarna, Egypt – 18th Dynasty. Petrie Museum, London.

The unconventional portrayals of Akhenaten—different from the traditional athletic norm in the portrayal of pharaohs—have led Egyptologists in the 19th and 20th centuries to suppose that Akhenaten had some kind of genetic abnormality. Various illnesses have been put forward, with Fröhlich's syndrome or Marfan syndrome being mentioned most commonly.

Cyril Aldred, following up earlier arguments of Grafton Smith and James Strachey, suggested that Akhenaten may have had Fröhlich's syndrome on the basis of his long jaw and his feminine appearance. However, this is unlikely, because this disorder results in sterility and Akhenaten is known to have fathered numerous children. His children are repeatedly portrayed through years of archaeological and iconographic evidence.

Burridge suggested that Akhenaten may have had Marfan syndrome, which, unlike Fröhlich's, does not result in mental impairment or sterility. People with Marfan syndrome tend towards tallness, with a long, thin face, elongated skull, overgrown ribs, a funnel or pigeon chest, a high curved or slightly cleft palate, and larger pelvis, with enlarged thighs and spindly calves, symptoms that appear in some depictions of Akhenaten. Marfan syndrome is a dominant characteristic, which means those affected have a 50% chance of passing it on to their children. However, DNA tests on Tutankhamun in 2010 proved negative for Marfan syndrome.

By the early 21st century, most Egyptologists argued that Akhenaten's portrayals are not the results of a genetic or medical condition, but rather should be interpreted as stylized portrayals influenced by Atenism. Akhenaten was made to look androgynous in artwork as a symbol of the androgyny of the Aten.

== Cultural depictions ==
Akhenaten's life, accomplishments, and legacy have been preserved and depicted in many ways, and he has figured in works of both high and popular culture since his rediscovery in the 19th century AD. Akhenaten—alongside Cleopatra and Alexander the Great—is among the most often popularized and fictionalized ancient historical figures.

On page, Amarna novels most often take one of two forms. They are either a Bildungsroman, focusing on Akhenaten's psychological and moral growth as it relates to establishing Atenism and Akhetaten, as well as his struggles against the Theban Amun cult. Alternatively, his literary depictions focus on the aftermath of his reign and religion. A dividing line also exists between depictions of Akhenaten from before the 1920s and since, when more and more archeological discoveries started to provide artists with material evidence about his life and times. Thus, before the 1920s, Akhenaten had appeared as "a ghost, a spectral figure" in art, while since he has become realistic, "material and tangible". Examples of the former include the romance novels In the Tombs of the Kings (1910) by Lilian Bagnall—the first appearance by Akhenaten and his wife Nefertiti in fiction—and A Wife Out of Egypt (1913) and There Was a King in Egypt (1918) by Norma Lorimer. Examples of the latter include Akhnaton King of Egypt (1924) by Dmitry Merezhkovsky, Joseph and His Brothers (1933–1943) by Thomas Mann, Akhnaton (1973) by Agatha Christie, and Akhenaten, Dweller in Truth (1985) by Naguib Mahfouz. Akhenaten also appears in The Egyptian (1945) by Mika Waltari, which was adapted into the movie The Egyptian (1954). In this movie, Akhenaten, portrayed by Michael Wilding, appears to represent Jesus Christ and his followers proto-Christians.

A sexualized image of Akhenaten, building on early Western interest in the pharaoh's androgynous depictions, perceived potential homosexuality, and identification with Oedipal storytelling, also influenced modern works of art. The two most notable portrayals are Akenaten (1975), an unfilmed screenplay by Derek Jarman, and Akhnaten (1984), an opera by Philip Glass. Both were influenced by the unproven and scientifically unsupported theories of Immanuel Velikovsky, who equated Oedipus with Akhenaten, although Glass specifically denies his personal belief in Velikovsky's Oedipus theory, or caring about its historical validity, instead being drawn to its potential theatricality.

In the 21st century, Akhenaten appeared as an antagonist in comic books and video games. For example, he is the major antagonist in limited comic-book series Marvel: The End (2003). Additionally, Akhenaten appears as the enemy in the Assassin's Creed Origins The Curse of the Pharaohs downloadable content (2017).

American death metal band Nile depicted Akhenaten's judgement, punishment, and erasure from history at the hands of the pantheon that he replaced with Aten, in the song "Cast Down the Heretic", from their 2005 album Annihilation of the Wicked. He was also featured on the cover artwork of their 2009 album, Those Whom the Gods Detest.

== Ancestry ==
Ancestors of Akhenaten

Amenhotep II
Thutmose IV
Tiaa
Amenhotep III
Mutemwiya
Akhenaten
Yuya
Tiye
Thuya

== See also ==
- Pharaoh of the Exodus
- Osarseph

== Notes and references ==
=== Bibliography ===
- "Akhenaten". Dictionary.com. Archived from the original on October 14, 2008.
- Dorman, Peter F. "Akhenaton (King of Egypt)". Britannica.com.
- Albright, William F. (1973). "From the Patriarchs to Moses II. Moses out of Egypt". The Biblical Archaeologist. 36 (2): 48–76. doi:10.2307/3211050. JSTOR 3211050. S2CID 135099403.
- Aldred, Cyril (1968). Akhenaten, Pharaoh of Egypt: A New Study. New Aspects of Antiquity (1st ed.). London: Thames and Hudson. ISBN 978-0500390047.
- Aldred, Cyril (1985) [1980]. Egyptian art in the Days of the Pharaohs 3100–32 BC. World of Art. London; New York: Thames & Hudson. ISBN 0-500-20180-3. LCCN 84-51309.
- Aldred, Cyril (1991) [1988]. Akhenaten, King of Egypt. London: Thames and Hudson. ISBN 0500276218.
- Allen, James Peter (1988). "Two Altered Inscriptions of the Late Amarna Period". Journal of the American Research Center in Egypt. 25. San Antonio, Texas: American Research Center in Egypt: 117–126. doi:10.2307/40000874. ISSN 0065-9991. JSTOR 40000874.
- Allen, James P. (2005). "Akhenaton". In Jones, L (ed.). Encyclopedia of Religion. Macmillan Reference.
- Allen, James Peter (2009). "The Amarna Succession". In Brand, Peter; Cooper, Louise (eds.). Causing His Name to Live: Studies in Egyptian Epigraphy and History in Memory of William J. Murnane (PDF). Culture and History of the Ancient Near East. Vol. 37. Leiden: E. J. Brill Academic Publishers. pp. 9–20. doi:10.1163/ej.9789004176447.i-240.9. ISBN 978-90-47-42988-3. Archived (PDF) from the original on May 21, 2020.
- Alter, Robert (2018). Couey, J. Blake; James, Elaine T. (eds.). Biblical Poetry and the Art of Close Reading. Cambridge University Press. ISBN 978-1-107-15620-3.
- "Amenhotep IV – Akhenaten". Marvel. 2021.
- Arnold, Dieter (2003) [1994]. Strudwick, Nigel; Strudwick, Helen (eds.). The Encyclopaedia of Ancient Egyptian Architecture (English language ed.). London: I.B. Tauris. ISBN 1-86064-465-1.
- Arnold, Dorothea (1996). The Royal Women of Amarna: Images of Beauty from Ancient Egypt (Exhibition catalogue). New York: The Metropolitan Museum of Art. ISBN 0-87099-816-1.
- Assmann, Jan (1997). Moses the Egyptian: The Memory of Egypt in Western Monotheism. Cambridge, Massachusetts: Harvard University Press. ISBN 0-674-58739-1.
- Assmann, Jan (2005). "'Axial' Breakthroughs and Semantic 'Relocations' in Ancient Egypt and Israel" (PDF). In Giesen, Bernhard; Šuber, Daniel (eds.). Religion And Politics: Cultural Perspectives (Conference publication). International Studies in Religion and Society. Vol. 3. Leiden; Boston: Brill Academic Publishers. pp. 39–53. ISBN 978-90-04-14463-7.
- Assmann, Jan (2020). The Invention of Religion: Faith and Covenant in the Book of Exodus. Princeton University Press. ISBN 978-0-691-20319-5.
- Baines, John Robert (2007). Visual and Written Culture in Ancient Egypt. Oxford; New York: Oxford University Press. ISBN 978-0-19-815250-7. OCLC 804615763.
- Baikie, James (1926). The Amarna Age. London: A. and C. Black.
- Baptista, Fernando G.; Santamarina, Oscar; Conant, Eve (April 20, 2017). "The Age of Akhenaten". National Geographic. Archived from the original on November 19, 2018.
- Bárta, Miroslav; Dulíková, Veronika (2015). "Divine and Terrestrial: The Rhetoric of Power in Ancient Egypt (The Case of Nyuserra)". In Coppens, Filip; Janák, Jiří; Vymazalová, Hana (eds.). Royal versus Divine Authority: Acquisition, Legitimization and Renewal of Power: 7th Symposium on Egyptian Royal Ideology, Prague, June 26–28, 2013 (Conference publication). Königtum, Staat und Gesellschaft früher Hochkulturen. Vol. 4, 4. Wiesbaden: Harrassowitz Verlag. pp. 31–47. ISBN 978-3-447-10427-2. OCLC 940935344.
- von Beckerath, Jürgen (1997). Chronologie des Pharaonischen Ägypten: Die Zeitbestimmung der ägyptischen Geschichte von der Vorzeit bis 332 v. Chr. Münchner Ägyptologische Studien (in German). Vol. 46. Mainz: Philipp von Zabern. ISBN 3805323107.
- Berman, Lawrence (2004) [1998]. "Overview of Amenhotep III and His Reign". In O'Connor, David B.; Cline, Eric H. (eds.). Amenhotep III: Perspectives on His Reign. Ann Arbor: The University of Michigan Press. ISBN 0-472-08833-5.
- Bickerstaffe, Dylan (2010). "The King Is Dead. How Long Lived the King?". Kmt. 21 (2). Weaverville, North Carolina: Kmt Communications. ISSN 1053-0827.
- Brand, Peter J. (2020). "The Historical Record". In Davies, Vanessa; Laboury, Dimitri (eds.). The Oxford Handbook of Egyptian Epigraphy and Palaeography. Oxford Handbooks. Oxford, New York: Oxford University Press. ISBN 978-0190604653.
- Braverman, Irwin M.; Mackowiak, Philip A. (June 23, 2010). "King Tutankhamun's Family and Demise". Letters. Journal of the American Medical Association. 303 (24). Chicago, Illinois: American Medical Association: 2471–2475. doi:10.1001/jama.2010.821. ISSN 1538-3598. PMID 20571008.
- Braverman, Irwin M.; Redford, Donald B.; Mackowiak, Philip A. (April 21, 2009). "Akhenaten and the Strange Physiques of Egypt's 18th Dynasty". Annals of Internal Medicine. 150 (8). American College of Physicians: 556–560. doi:10.7326/0003-4819-150-8-200904210-00010. ISSN 1539-3704. OCLC 43032966. PMID 19380856. S2CID 24766974.
- Breasted, James Henry, ed. (2001) [1906]. Ancient Records of Egypt. Vol. 2 (Paperback ed.). Urbana; Chicago: University of Illinois Press. ISBN 0-252-06974-9.
- Breasted, James Henry (1909). A History Of Egypt: From the Earliest Times to the Persian Conquest (2nd ed.). New York: Charles Scribner's Sons. OCLC 848576611.
- Breasted, James Henry (1972). Development of religion and thought in ancient Egypt. Philadelphia, Pennsylvania: University of Pennsylvania Press. ISBN 978-0-8122-1045-3.
- Brown, William P. (2014). The Oxford Handbook of the Psalms. Oxford University Press. ISBN 978-0-19-979050-0.
- Bryce, Trevor Robert (1998). The Kingdom of the Hittites (First ed.). Oxford; New York: Clarendon Press; Oxford University Press. ISBN 0198140959. LCCN 97014411.
- Burridge, A. (September 1995). "Did Akhenaten Suffer From Marfan's Syndrome?". Akhenaten Temple Project Newsletter (3).
- Chaney, Edward (2006a). "Freudian Egypt". The London Magazine. 2016 (April/May). London: Burhan Al-Chalabi: 62–69. ISSN 0024-6085.
- Chaney, Edward (2006b). "Egypt in England and America: The Cultural Memorials of Religion, Royalty and Revolution". In Ascari, Maurizio; Corrado, Adriana (eds.). Sites of Exchange: European Crossroads and Faultlines. Internationale Forschungen Zur Allgemeinen Und Vergleichenden Literaturwissenschaft. Vol. 103. Amsterdam: Rodopi. pp. 39–69. ISBN 978-9042020153.
- Clayton, Peter (2006). Chronicle of the Pharaohs, Thames and Hudson
- Cohen, Raymond; Westbrook, Raymond, eds. (2002) [2000]. Amarna Diplomacy: The Beginnings of International Relations (Paperback ed.). Baltimore; London: The Johns Hopkins University Press. ISBN 0-8018-7103-4.
- Darnell, John Coleman; Manassa, Colleen (2007). Tutankhamun's Armies: Battle and Conquest during Ancient Egypt's Late 18th Dynasty. Hoboken, New Jersey: John Wiley & Sons, Inc. ISBN 978-0-471-74358-3. OCLC 70265584.
- David, Rosalie (1998). Handbook to Life in Ancient Egypt. Facts on File Inc.
- Davidson, Justin (November 11, 2019). "Gleaming and Self-Aware, Philip Glass's Akhnaten Is Borne to the Met". Vulture. Vox Media. Archived from the original on October 21, 2020.
- Davies, Norman de Garis (1903–1908). The Rock Tombs of El Amarna. Memoir (Archaeological Survey of Egypt). Vol. 13–14. London: Egypt Exploration Fund. OCLC 11263615.
- Day, John (2013). "Psalm 104 and Akhenaten's Hymn to the Sun". In Gillingham, Susan (ed.). Jewish and Christian Approaches to the Psalms: Conflict and Convergence. Oxford University Press. pp. 211–228. ISBN 978-0-19-969954-4.
- Day, John (2014). From Creation to Babel: Studies in Genesis 1-11. Bloomsbury Publishing. ISBN 978-0-567-37030-3.
- Desroches-Noblecourt, Christiane (1963). Tutankhamen: Life and Death of a Pharaoh. Illustrated by F. L. Kenett (1st ed.). New York: New York Graphic Society. ISBN 978-0821201510.
- van Dijk, Jacobus (2003) [2000]. "The Amarna Period and the Later New Kingdom (c.1352–1069 BC)" (PDF). In Shaw, Ian (ed.). The Oxford History of Ancient Egypt (New ed.). Oxford; New York: Oxford University Press. pp. 265–307. ISBN 978-0-19-280458-7. Archived (PDF) from the original on June 19, 2018.
- Dodson, Aidan (2012). "Akhenaten (Amenhotep IV)". In Bagnall, Roger S.; Brodersen, Kai; Champion, Craige B.; Erskine, Andrew; Huebner, Sabine R. (eds.). The Encyclopedia of Ancient History. Vol. 1. Malden, Massachusetts: Blackwell Publishing Ltd. ISBN 978-1405179355. OCLC 230191195.
- Dodson, Aidan (2014). Amarna Sunrise: Egypt from the Golden Age to Age of Heresy (1st ed.). Cairo; New York: The American University in Cairo Press. ISBN 978-9774166334.
- Dodson, Aidan (2009). Amarna Sunset: Nefertiti, Tutankhamun, Ay, Horemheb, and the Egyptian Counter-Reformation (1st ed.). Cairo; New York: The American University in Cairo Press. ISBN 978-977-416-304-3.
- Dodson, Aidan (2018) [2009]. Amarna Sunset: Nefertiti, Tutankhamun, Ay, Horemheb, and the Egyptian Counter-Reformation (Revised ed.). Cairo; New York: The American University in Cairo Press. ISBN 978-977-416-859-8. OCLC 1004248105.
- Dodson, Aidan; Hilton, Dyan (2004). The Complete Royal Families of Ancient Egypt. Thames & Hudson.
- Drioton, Étienne; Vandier, Jacques (1952) [1938]. L'Égypte. Les Peuples de l'Orient Méditerranéen (in French). Vol. II (3rd ed.). Paris: Presses Universitaires de France.
- Duhig, Corinne (2010). "The remains of Pharaoh Akhenaten are not yet identified: Comments on 'Biological age of the skeletonised mummy from Tomb KV55 at Thebes (Egypt)' by Eugen Strouhal". Anthropologie. 48 (2). Moravian Museum: 113–115. JSTOR 26292899. "It is essential that, whether the KV55 skeleton is that of Smenkhkare or some previously-unknown prince... the assumption that the KV55 bones are those of Akhenaten be rejected before it becomes "received wisdom"."
- Elmar, Edel (1948). "Neue Keilschriftliche Umschreibungen Ägyptischer Namen aus den Boǧazköytexten". Journal of Near Eastern Studies (in German). 7 (1). The University of Chicago Press: 11–24. doi:10.1086/370848. ISSN 0022-2968. JSTOR 542570.
- Fecht, Gerhard (1960). "Amarna Probleme (1–2)". Zeitschrift für Ägyptische Sprache und Altertumskunde (in German). 85. De Gruyter: 83–118. doi:10.1524/zaes.1960.85.1.99. ISSN 0044-216X. S2CID 192846780.
- Freud, Sigmund (1939). Moses and Monotheism. New York: A.A. Knopf. OCLC 624780.
- Gabolde, Marc (1998). D'Akhenaton à Toutânkhamon. Collection de l'Institut d'Archéologie et d'Histoire de l'Antiquité (in French). Vol. 3. Lyon: Université Lumière-Lyon 2. ISBN 978-2911971020. ISSN 1275-269X.
- Gabolde, Marc (February 17, 2011). "The End of the Amarna Period". BBC.co.uk. BBC.
- Gardiner, Alan H. (1905). The Inscriptions of Mes, A Contribution to the Study of Egyptian Judicial Procedure. Untersuchungen zur Geschichte und Altertumskunde Ägyptens. Vol. IV, Book 3. J. C. Hinrichs publishers.
- Gardiner, Shayna (2015). "Taking Possession of the Constant Rate Hypothesis: Variation and Change in Ancient Egyptian Possessive Constructions". University of Pennsylvania Working Papers in Linguistics. 21 (2): 69–78.
- Gohary, Jocelyn Olive (1992). Akhenaten's Sed-festival at Karnak. Studies in Egyptology (1st ed.). London; New York: Kegan Paul International. ISBN 978-0710303806. ISSN 1754-601X. OCLC 22309806.
- Goldwasser, Orly (1992). "Literary Late Egyptian as a Polysystem". Poetics Today. 13 (3). Duke University Press: 447–462. doi:10.2307/1772871. ISSN 0333-5372. JSTOR 1772871.
- Grajetzki, Wolfram (2005). Ancient Egyptian Queens: A Hieroglyphic Dictionary. London: Golden House Publications. ISBN 978-0-9547218-9-3. OCLC 61189103.
- Hall, Henry (1921). "Egypt and the External World in the Time of Akhenaten". The Journal of Egyptian Archaeology. 7 (1): 39–53. doi:10.1177/030751332100700105. S2CID 192247058.
- Harris, James E.; Wente, Edward F., eds. (1980). An X-ray Atlas of the Royal Mummies (1st ed.). Chicago: University of Chicago Press. ISBN 978-0226317458.
- Hart, George (2000) [1986]. A Dictionary of Egyptian Gods and Goddesses. London; New York: Routledge. ISBN 0415059097.
- Hawass, Zahi (September 2010). "King Tut's Family Secrets". National Geographic. Photographs by Kenneth Garrett. Washington, D.C.: National Geographic Society. Archived from the original on May 9, 2020.
- Hawass, Zahi; Gad, Yehia Z.; Somaia, Ismail; Khairat, Rabab; Fathalla, Dina; Hasan, Naglaa; Ahmed, Amal; Elleithy, Hisham; Ball, Markus; Gaballah, Fawzi; Wasef, Sally; Fateen, Mohamed; Amer, Hany; Gostner, Paul; Selim, Ashraf; Zink, Albert; Pusch, Carsten M. (February 17, 2010). "Ancestry and Pathology in King Tutankhamun's Family". Journal of the American Medical Association. 303 (7). Chicago, Illinois: American Medical Association: 638–647. Bibcode:2010JAMA..303..638H. doi:10.1001/jama.2010.121. ISSN 1538-3598. PMID 20159872.
- Hessler, Peter (2017). "Meet King Tut's Father, Egypt's First Revolutionary". National Geographic. National Geographic Society.
- Hoffmeier, James K. (2005). Ancient Israel in Sinai: The Evidence for the Authenticity of the Wilderness Tradition. Oxford University Press, USA. ISBN 978-0-19-515546-4.
- Hoffmeier, James Karl (2015). Akhenaten and the Origins of Monotheism (1st ed.). Oxford; New York: Oxford University Press. ISBN 978-0199792085.
- Hornung, Erik (1992). "The Rediscovery of Akhenaten and His Place in Religion". Journal of the American Research Center in Egypt. 29. San Antonio, Texas: American Research Center in Egypt: 43–49. doi:10.2307/40000483. ISSN 0065-9991. JSTOR 40000483.
- Hornung, Erik (2001) [1995]. Akhenaten and the Religion of Light. Translated by Lorton, David. Ithaca, New York; London: Cornell University Press. ISBN 978-0-8014-8725-5. OCLC 48417401.
- Hornung, Erik; Krauss, Rolf; Warburton, David, eds. (2006). Ancient Egyptian Chronology. Handbook of Oriental Studies. Vol. 83. Brill. ISBN 978-90-04-11385-5.
- Hotton, Emily (November 3, 2018). "Game Review: Assassin's Creed – The Curse of the Pharaohs". Nile Scribe.
- Kemp, Barry John (2015). "The Amarna Royal Tombs at Amarna" (PDF). Akhetaten Sun. Vol. 21, no. 2. Denver, Colorado: Amarna Research Foundation. pp. 2–13. Archived from the original (PDF) on June 8, 2020.
- Kitchen, Kenneth Anderson (2003). On the Reliability of the Old Testament. Grand Rapids, Michigan: William. B. Eerdmans Publishing. ISBN 978-0-8028-0396-2.
- Kitchen, Kenneth Anderson (2000). "Regnal and Genealogical Data of Ancient Egypt (Absolute Chronology I): The Historical Chronology of Ancient Egypt, A Current Assessment". In Bietak, Manfred (ed.). The Synchronisation of Civlisations in the Eastern Mediterranean in the Second Millennium B.C.: Proceedings of an international symposium at Schloss Haindorf, 15th–17th of November 1996 and at the Austrian Academy, Vienna, 11th–12th of May 1998 (Conference proceedings). Contributions to the Chronology of the Eastern Mediterranean. Vol. 4. Vienna, Austria: Austrian Academy of Sciences Press. ISBN 978-3-7001-2936-3.
- Kitchen, Kenneth Anderson (1986) [1972]. The Third Intermediate Period in Egypt (1100–650 BC) (2nd ed.). Warminster, England: Aris & Phillips. ISBN 978-0-85668-298-8.
- Laboury, Dimitri (2010). Akhénaton. Les grands pharaons (in French). Paris: Pygmalion-Flammarion. ISBN 978-2756400433.
- Landes, Richard (2011). Heaven on Earth: The Varieties of the Millennial Experience. Oxford University Press. ISBN 978-0-19-983181-4.
- Laroche, Emmanuel (1971). Catalogue des Textes Hittites (in French). Paris: Klincksieck. OCLC 607304.
- Leprohon, Ronald J. (2013). The Great Name: Ancient Egyptian Royal Titulary. SBL Press. ISBN 978-1-58983-736-2.
- Levenson, Jon Douglas (1994). Creation and the persistence of evil. Princeton University Press. ISBN 0-691-02950-4.
- Lorenz, Megaera. "Lorenz, Maegara "The Mystery of Akhenaton: Genetics or Aesthetics"". Heptune.com. Archived from the original on February 8, 2010.
- Lorenzen, Eline D; Willerslev, E (2010). "King Tutankhamun's Family and Demise". JAMA. 303 (24): 2471, author reply 2473–475. doi:10.1001/jama.2010.818. PMID 20571007.
- Manniche, Lise (2010). Akhenaten Colossi of Karnak. Cairo: American University in Cairo Press. OCLC 938908123.
- Marchant, Jo (2011). "Ancient DNA: Curse of the Pharaoh's DNA". Nature. 472 (7344): 404–406. Bibcode:2011Natur.472..404M. doi:10.1038/472404a. PMID 21525906.
- "Marfan syndrome". Gaithersburg, Maryland: National Center for Advancing Translational Sciences. January 26, 2017. Archived from the original on November 5, 2018.
- Mark, Joshua J. (April 22, 2014). "Horemheb". World History Encyclopedia.
- Martín Valentín, Francesco J.; Bedman, Teresa (2014). "Proof of a 'Long Coregency' between Amenhotep III & Amenhotep IV Found in the Chapel of Vizier Amenhotep-Huy (Asasif Tomb 28) West Luxor". Kmt. 25 (2). Weaverville, North Carolina: Kmt Communications: 17–27. ISSN 1053-0827.
- Montserrat, Dominic (2003) [2000]. Akhenaten: History, Fantasy and Ancient Egypt (1st paperback ed.). London; New York: Routledge. ISBN 0415301866.
- Moran, William Lambert, ed. (1992) [1987]. The Amarna Letters (English-language ed.). Baltimore; London: The Johns Hopkins University Press. ISBN 0-8018-4251-4. LCCN 91020570.
- Murnane, William J. (1995). Texts from the Amarna Period in Egypt. Society of Biblical Literature Writings from the Ancient World. Vol. 5. Atlanta: Society of Biblical Literature. ISBN 978-1555409661.
- Murnane, William J.; Van Siclen III, Charles C. (2011) [1993]. The Boundary Stelae Of Akhentaten. London; New York: Routledge. ISBN 978-0710304643.
- Najovits, Simson (2004). Egypt, the Trunk of the Tree, A Modern Survey of and Ancient Land, Vol. II. New York: Algora Publishing. ISBN 978-0875862569.
- Nims, Charles F. (1973). "The Transition from the Traditional to the New Style of Wall Relief under Amenhotep IV". Journal of Near Eastern Studies. 32 (1/2). Chicago, Illinois: University of Chicago Press: 181–187. doi:10.1086/372234. ISSN 0022-2968. JSTOR 543483.
- Van der Perre, Athena (2012). "Nofretetes [vorerst] letzte dokumentierte Erwähnung". In Kampp-Seyfried, Friederike (ed.). Im Licht von Amarna – 100 Jahre Fund der Nofretete (Exhibition catalogue) (in German). Petersberg, Hesse: Imhof Verlag. ISBN 978-3865688422.
- Van der Perre, Athena (2014). "The Year 16 graffito of Akhenaten in Dayr Abū Ḥinnis: A Contribution to the Study of the Later Years of Nefertiti". Journal of Egyptian History. 7 (1). Brill: 67–108. doi:10.1163/18741665-12340014. ISSN 1874-1657.
- Perry, Dominic (May 15, 2019). "The Aten Appears (Episode 110)". The History of Egypt Podcast (Podcast). Event occurs at 03:59. Archived from the original on June 22, 2020.
- O'Connor, David; Silverman, David P., eds. (1995). Ancient Egyptian Kingship. Probleme der Ägyptologie. Vol. 9. Leiden; New York; Köln: Brill. ISBN 90-04-10041-5.
- Ockinga, Boyo (2001). "Piety". In Redford, Donald (ed.). The Oxford Encyclopedia of Ancient Egypt. Vol. 3. Oxford University Press. pp. 44–47. ISBN 0-19-510234-7.
- Rawlinson, George (1881). History of Ancient Egypt. Vol. 2. Longmans, Green, and Co.
- Redford, Donald B. (1976). "The Sun-disc in Akhenaten's Program: Its Worship and Antecedents, I". Journal of the American Research Center in Egypt. 13. San Antonio, Texas: American Research Center in Egypt: 53–56. doi:10.2307/40001118. ISSN 0065-9991. JSTOR 40001118.
- Redford, Donald B. (1984). Akhenaten: The Heretic King. Princeton, New Jersey: Princeton University Press. ISBN 978-0691035673. OCLC 10099207.
- Redford, Donald B. (1987). "The Monotheism of the Heretic Pharaoh: Precursor of Mosaic monotheism or Egyptian anomaly?". Biblical Archaeology Review. 13 (3): 53–56.
- Redford, Donald B.; Shanks, Hershel; Meinhardt, Jack (1997). Aspects of Monotheism: How God is One (Conference paper and proceedings). Washington, D.C.: Biblical Archaeology Society. ISBN 978-1880317198. OCLC 37608180.
- Redford, Donald B. (May 2013). "Akhenaten: New Theories and Old Facts". Bulletin of the American Schools of Oriental Research. 369 (369). American Schools of Oriental Research: 9–34. doi:10.5615/bullamerschoorie.369.0009. ISSN 0003-097X. JSTOR 10.5615/bullamerschoorie.369.000. OCLC 05748058.
- Reeves, Nicholas (2019) [2001]. Akhenaten: Egypt's False Prophet (Electronic ed.). London; New York: Thames & Hudson. ISBN 978-0-500-29469-7. LCCN 00108868.
- Ridley, Ronald Thomas (2019). Akhenaten: A Historian's View. The AUC History of Ancient Egypt. Cairo; New York: The American University in Cairo Press. ISBN 978-9774167935.
- Robins, G. (1993). Women in Ancient Egypt. Harvard University Press.
- Rogers, Robert William, ed. (1912). Cuneiform Parallels to the Old Testament. London; Toronto; Melbourne; and Bombay: Oxford University Press.
- "The royal family at Amarna". University College London. 2001.
- Ross, Barbara (November–December 1999). "Akhenaten and Rib Hadda from Byblos". Saudi Aramco World. 50 (6): 30–35. Archived from the original on January 13, 2010.
- Schemm, Paul (February 16, 2010). "A Frail King Tut Died From Malaria, Broken Leg". USA Today. Associated Press.
- Schulman, Alan R. (1982). "The Nubian War of Akhenaten". L'Égyptologie en 1979: Axes prioritaires de recherches. Colloques internationaux du Centre national de la recherche scientifique. Vol. 2. Paris: Editions du Centre national de la recherche scientifique. pp. 299–316. ISBN 978-2222029298.
- Sethe, Kurt, ed. (1906–1909). Urkunden der 18. Dynastie [Documents of the 18th Dynasty] (PDF). Urkunden des Ägyptischen Altertums (in German). Vol. 4. Leipzig, Germany: J.C. Hinrichs'sche Buchhandlung. Archived (PDF) from the original on June 6, 2020.
- Shaw, Ian, ed. (2003) [2000]. The Oxford History of Ancient Egypt (New ed.). Oxford; New York: Oxford University Press. ISBN 978-0-19-280458-7.
- Shaw, Ian (2004). Ancient Egypt: A Very Short Introduction. Oxford University Press. ISBN 978-0-19-157840-3.
- Shupak, Nili (1995). "The Monotheism of Moses and the Monotheism of Akhenaten". The Bible as a Meeting Point of Cultures through the Ages. Sevivoth. pp. 18–27.
- Silverman, David P.; Wegner, Josef W.; Wegner, Jennifer Houser (2006). Akhenaten and Tutankhamun: Revolution and Restoration (1st ed.). Philadelphia, Pennsylvania: University of Pennsylvania Museum of Archeology and Anthropology. ISBN 978-1931707909.
- Smith, Elliot, ed. (1923). Tutankhamen and the discovery of his tomb by the late Earl of Carnarvon and Mr Howard Carter. London: Routledge.
- Sooke, Alastair (January 9, 2014). "Akhenaten: mad, bad, or brilliant?". The Daily Telegraph. Archived from the original on January 11, 2022.
- Sooke, Alastair (February 4, 2016). "How ancient Egypt shaped our idea of beauty". Culture. British Broadcasting Corporation.
- Spence, Kate (February 17, 2011). "Akhenaten and the Amarna Period". BBC.co.uk. BBC.
- Stent, Gunther Siegmund (2002). Paradoxes of Free Will. Transactions of the American Philosophical Society. Vol. 92. Philadelphia, Pennsylvania: American Philosophical Society. ISBN 0-87169-926-5. OCLC 50773277.
- Strachey, James (1939). "Preliminary Notes Upon the Problem of Akhenaten". International Journal of Psycho-Analysis. 20: 33–42. ISSN 0020-7578.
- Strouhal, Eugen (2010). "Biological age of skeletonized mummy from Tomb KV 55 at Thebes". Anthropologie. 48 (2). Brno, Czech Republic: Moravian Museum: 97–112. JSTOR 26292898.
- Takács, Sarolta Anna; Cline, Eric H., eds. (2015) [2007]. "Akhenaten (also Akhenaton) (r. ca. 1353–1335 B.C.E.)". The Ancient World. Vol. 1–5. London; New York: Routledge. ISBN 978-0-7656-8082-2. LCCN 2006101384.
- Trigger, Bruce Graham; Kemp, Barry; O'Connor, David Bourke; Lloyd, Alan Brian (2001) [1983]. Ancient Egypt, A Social History. Cambridge; New York: Cambridge University Press. ISBN 0521284279. LCCN 82-22196.
- Tyldesley, Joyce Ann (1998). Nefertiti: Egypt's Sun Queen. London: Viking. ISBN 978-0670869985. OCLC 1153684328.
- Tyldesley, Joyce A. (2005). Egypt: How a Lost Civilisation was Rediscovered. Berkeley, California: University of California Press. ISBN 978-0520250208.
- Tyldesley, Joyce A. (2006). Chronicle of the Queens of Egypt: From Early Dynastic Times to the Death of Cleopatra. New York: Thames & Hudson. ISBN 0-500-05145-3. OCLC 61189103.
- Wilkinson, Richard H. (2003). The Complete Gods and Goddesses of Ancient Egypt. London: Thames & Hudson. ISBN 0-500-05120-8.
- Zaki, Mey (2008). The Legacy of Tutankhamun: Art and History. Photographs by Farid Atiya. Giza, Egypt: Farid Atiya Press. ISBN 978-977-17-4930-1.

=== Further reading ===
- Aldred, Cyril (1973). Akhenaten and Nefertiti. London: Thames & Hudson.
- Aldred, Cyril (1984). The Egyptians. London: Thames & Hudson.
- Allen, James Peter (1994). "Nefertiti and Smenkh-ka-re". Göttinger Miszellen. 141. Göttingen, Germany: Verlag der Göttinger Miszellen: 7–17. ISSN 0344-385X.
- Asante, Molefi Kete; Mazama, Ama (2009). Encyclopedia of African Religion. Thousand Oaks, California: Sage Publications.
- Ashrafian, Hutan (September 2012). "Familial epilepsy in the pharaohs of ancient Egypt's 18th Dynasty". Epilepsy & Behavior. 25 (1): 23–31. doi:10.1016/j.yebeh.2012.06.014. PMID 22980077. S2CID 20771815.
- Bilolo, Mubabinge (2004) [1988]. "Sect. I, vol. 2". Le Créateur et la Création dans la pensée memphite et amarnienne. Approche synoptique du Document Philosophique de Memphis et du Grand Hymne Théologique d'Echnaton (in French) (new ed.). Munich-Paris: Academy of African Thought.
- Čavka, Mislav; Kelava, Kelava; Čavka, Vlatka; Bušić, Željko; Olujić, Boris; Brkljačić, Boris (March 2010). "Homocystinuria, a possible solution of the Akhenaten's mystery". Collegium Antropologicum. 34 (Suppl. 1). Croatian Anthropological Society: 255–258. ISSN 0350-6134. PMID 20402329.
- El Mahdy, Christine (1999). Tutankhamen: The Life and Death of a Boy King. Headline.
- Choi B, Pak A (2001). "Lessons for surveillance in the 21st century: a historical perspective from the past five millennia". Soz Praventivmed. 46 (6): 361–368. doi:10.1007/BF01321662. hdl:10.1007/BF01321662. PMID 11851070. S2CID 12263035.
- Locker, Melissa (September 12, 2013). "Did King Tutankhamen Die From Epilepsy?". Time.
- Málek, Jaromír (1996). "The "Coregency relief" of Akhenaten and Smenkhare from Memphis". In Der Manuelian, Peter; Freed, Rita E. (eds.). Studies in Honor of William Kelly Simpson (PDF). Vol. 2. Boston: Museum of Fine Arts. ISBN 0-87846-390-9. Archived (PDF) from the original on October 9, 2022.
- Miller, Jared L. (2007). "Amarna Age Chronology and the Identity of Nibh ̆ururiyain the Light of a Newly Reconstructed Hittite Text" (PDF). Altorientalische Forschungen. 34 (2). De Gruyter: 252–293. Archived (PDF) from the original on February 12, 2020.
- Rita E. Freed; Yvonne J. Markowitz (1999). Sue H. D'Auria (ed.). Pharaohs of the Sun: Akhenaten – Nefertiti – Tutankhamen. Bulfinch Press.
- Gestoso Singer, Graciela (2008). El Intercambio de Bienes entre Egipto y Asia Anterior. Desde el reinado de Tuthmosis III hasta el de Akhenaton Free Access (in Spanish) Ancient Near East Monographs, Volume 2. Buenos Aires, Society of Biblical Literature – CEHAO.
- Singer, Itamar. The failed reforms of Akhenaten and Muwatalli, British Museum Studies in Ancient Egypt and Sudan (BMSAES) 6 (2006), pp.37–58
- Holland, Tom (1998). The Sleeper in the Sands (novel), Abacus – a fictionalised adventure story based closely on the mysteries of Akhenaten's reign
- Kozloff, Arielle (2006). "Bubonic Plague in the Reign of Amenhotep III?". KMT. 17 (3).
- McAvoy, S. (2007). "Mummy 61074: a Strange Case of Mistaken Identity". Antiguo Oriente. 5: 183–194.
- Najovits, Simson. Egypt, Trunk of the Tree, Volume I, The Contexts, Volume II, The Consequences, Algora Publishing, New York, 2003 and 2004. On Akhenaten: Vol. II, Chapter 11, pp. 117–73 and Chapter 12, pp. 205–13
- Redford, Donald B. (1984). Akhenaten: The Heretic King. Princeton University Press
- Shortridge K (1992). "Pandemic influenza: a zoonosis?". Semin Respir Infect. 7 (1): 11–25. PMID 1609163.
- Stevens, Anna (2012). Akhenaten's workers : the Amarna Stone village survey, 2005–2009. Volume I, The survey, excavations and architecture. Egypt Exploration Society.
- Van Dyke, John Charles (1887). Principles of Art: Pt. 1. Art in History; Pt. 2. Art in Theory. New York, New York: Fords, Howard, & Hulbert.
- Wolf, Walther (1951). Die Stellung der ägyptischen Kunst zur antiken und abendländischen und Das Problem des Künstlers in der ägyptischen Kunst (in German). Hildesheim, Germany: Gerstenberg.
