= Amarna Period =

1358–1336 BC period of the Egyptian 18th Dynasty

The Amarna Period (1348-1320 BCE) is a brief era of Egyptian history when the royal residence of the pharaoh shifted from the old capital of Thebes (Waset) to the desert plain of Akhet-Aten (modern-day Amarna). This move occurred during the reign of Akhenaten (formerly Amenhotep IV) to solidify the dramatic change from Egypt's polytheistic religion into a monotheistic religion, referred to as Atenism, where the sun disc Aten was worshipped over all other gods. This period's great religious reforms are echoed in its distinct art style.

The Amarna Period ended when Tutankhamun moved the capital back to Thebes and restored the polytheistic religion.

The god Aten, Pharaoh Akhenaten, Queen Nefertiti, and three young princesses in Amarna period art.

== Origins ==
=== Religious developments ===
Akhenaten instigated the earliest verified expression of a form of monotheism, although the origins of a pure monotheism are the subject of continuing debate within the academic community. Some state that Akhenaten restored monotheism, while others point out that he merely suppressed a dominant solar cult by the assertion of another, never completely abandoning several other traditional deities. Scholars believe that Akhenaten's devotion to his deity, the Aten, offended many in power below him, which contributed to the end of this dynasty. Akhenaten later suffered damnatio memoriae and was referred to as "that criminal of Akhet-Aten". Although modern students of Egyptology consider the monotheism of Akhenaten to be the most important event of this period, the later Egyptians considered the so-called "Amarna period" an unfortunate aberration.

Despite the radical change in religion, approximately 20,000 Egyptian people followed Akhenaten to his new capital, Akhet-Aten. Inscriptions uncovered at Amarna say that Akhenaten chose this area on behalf of the Aten and that no other god had been worshipped there. Some scholars have suggested Akhenaten believed the Aten chose this location because the nearby cliffs appear to make the hieroglyphic for "horizon" when viewed from a distance.

The Amarna period saw many innovations in the name and service of religion. Egyptians of the time viewed religion and science as one and the same. Previously, the presence of many gods explained the natural phenomena, but during the Amarna period there was a rise in monotheism. With people beginning to think of the origins of the universe, Aten was seen as the sole creator and Sun-god, as evident by the Great Hymn to the Aten.

After the Amarna period, these religious beliefs fell out of favor. It has been argued that this was in part because only the king and his family were allowed to worship Aten directly, while others were permitted only to worship the king and his family.

=== Founding of new capital city ===
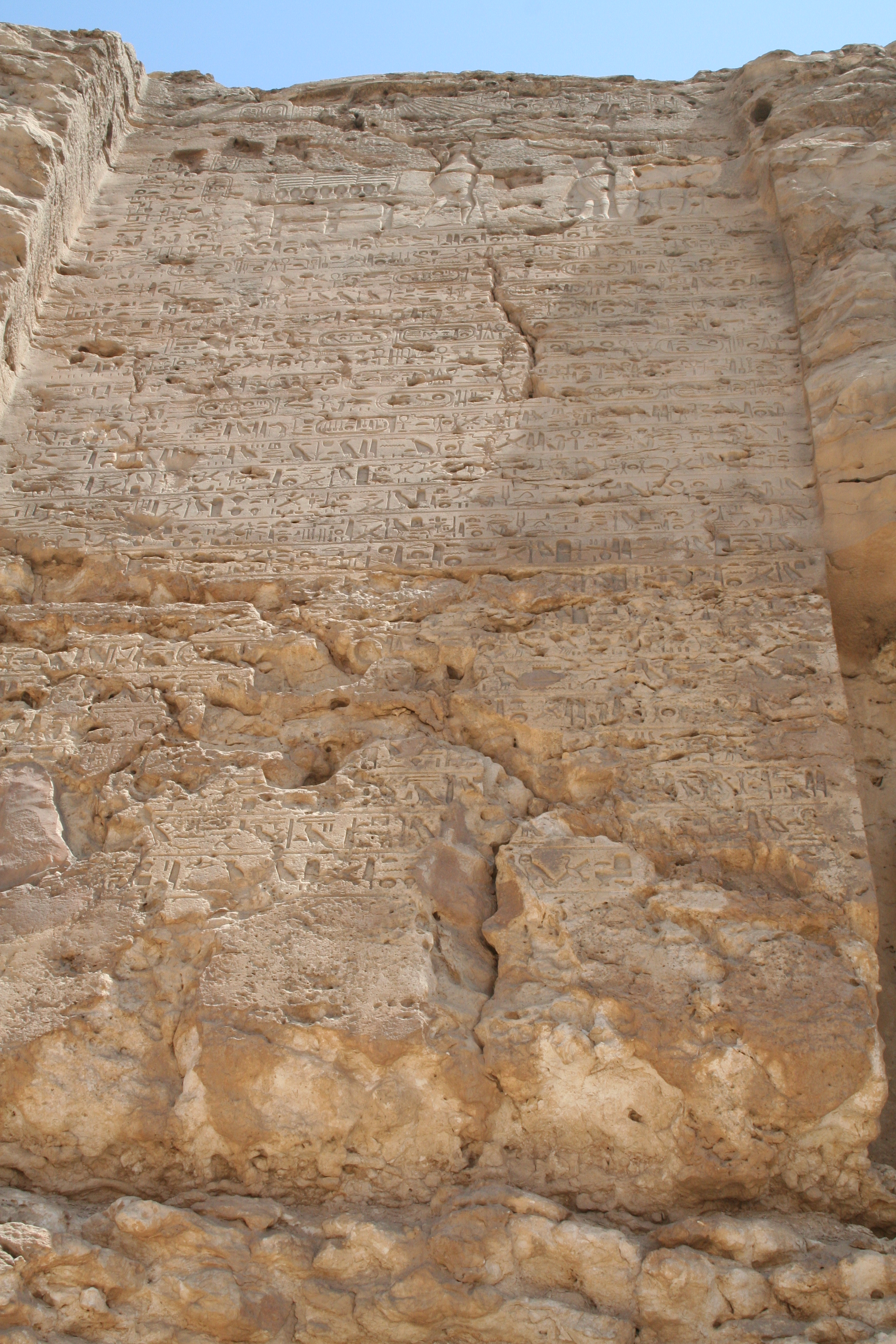
One of the stele marking the boundary of the new capital Akhetaten

Around the same time he changed his royal titulary, on the thirteenth day of the growing season's fourth month, Akhenaten decreed that a new capital city be built: Akhet-Aten (Ancient Egyptian: ꜣḫt-jtn, meaning "Horizon of the Aten"), the city known today as Amarna.

The events that Egyptologists know the most about during Akhenaten's life are connected with founding Akhet-Aten, as several so-called boundary stelae were found around the city to mark its boundary. The pharaoh chose a site about halfway between Thebes, the capital at the time, and Memphis, on the east bank of the Nile, where a wadi and a natural dip in the surrounding cliffs form a silhouette similar to the "horizon" hieroglyph. Additionally, the site had previously been uninhabited. According to inscriptions on one boundary stela, the site was appropriate for Aten's city for "not being the property of a god, nor being the property of a goddess, nor being the property of a ruler, nor being the property of a female ruler, nor being the property of any people able to lay claim to it."

Historians do not know for certain why Akhenaten established a new capital and left Thebes, the old capital. The boundary stelae detailing Akhet-Aten's founding is damaged where it likely explained the pharaoh's motives for the move. Surviving parts claim what happened to Akhenaten was "worse than those that I heard" previously in his reign and worse than those "heard by any kings who assumed the White Crown", and alludes to "offensive" speech against the Aten. Egyptologists believe that Akhenaten could be referring to conflict with the priesthood and followers of Amun, the patron god of Thebes. The great temples of Amun, such as Karnak, were all located in Thebes and the priests there achieved significant power earlier in the Eighteenth Dynasty, especially under Hatshepsut and Thutmose III, thanks to pharaohs offering large amounts of Egypt's growing wealth to the cult of Amun; historians, such as Donald B. Redford, therefore posited that by moving to a new capital, Akhenaten may have been trying to break with Amun's priests and the god.

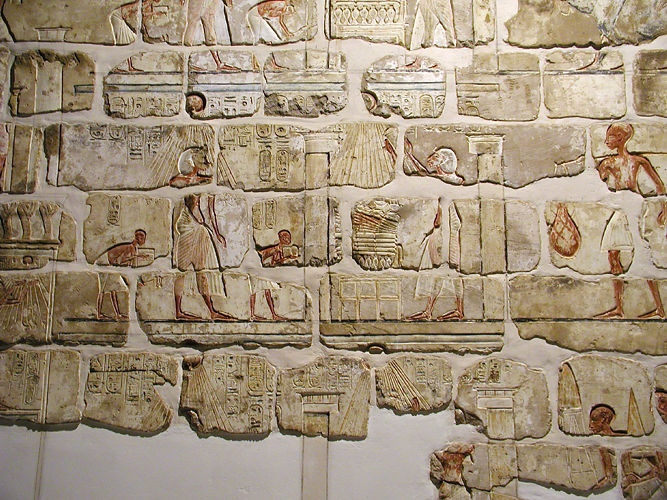
Talatat blocks from Akhenaten's Aten temple in Karnak

Akhet-Aten was a planned city with the Great Temple of the Aten, Small Aten Temple, royal residences, records office, and government buildings in the city center. Some of these buildings, such as the Aten temples, were ordered to be built by Akhenaten on the boundary stela decreeing the city's founding.

The city was built quickly, thanks to a new construction method that used substantially smaller building blocks than under previous pharaohs. These blocks, called talatats, measured 1/2 by 1/2 by 1 ancient Egyptian cubits (c. 27 by 27 by 54 cm), and because of the smaller weight and standardized size, using them during constructions was more efficient than using heavy building blocks of varying sizes. By regnal year eight, Akhet-Aten reached a state where it could be occupied by the royal family. Only his most loyal subjects followed Akhenaten and his family to the new city. While the city continued to be built, in years five through eight, construction work began to stop in Thebes. The Theban Aten temples that had begun were abandoned, and a village of those working on Valley of the Kings tombs was relocated to the workers' village at Akhet-Aten. However, construction work continued in the rest of the country, as larger cult centers, such as Heliopolis and Memphis, also had temples built for Aten.

== Royal family ==
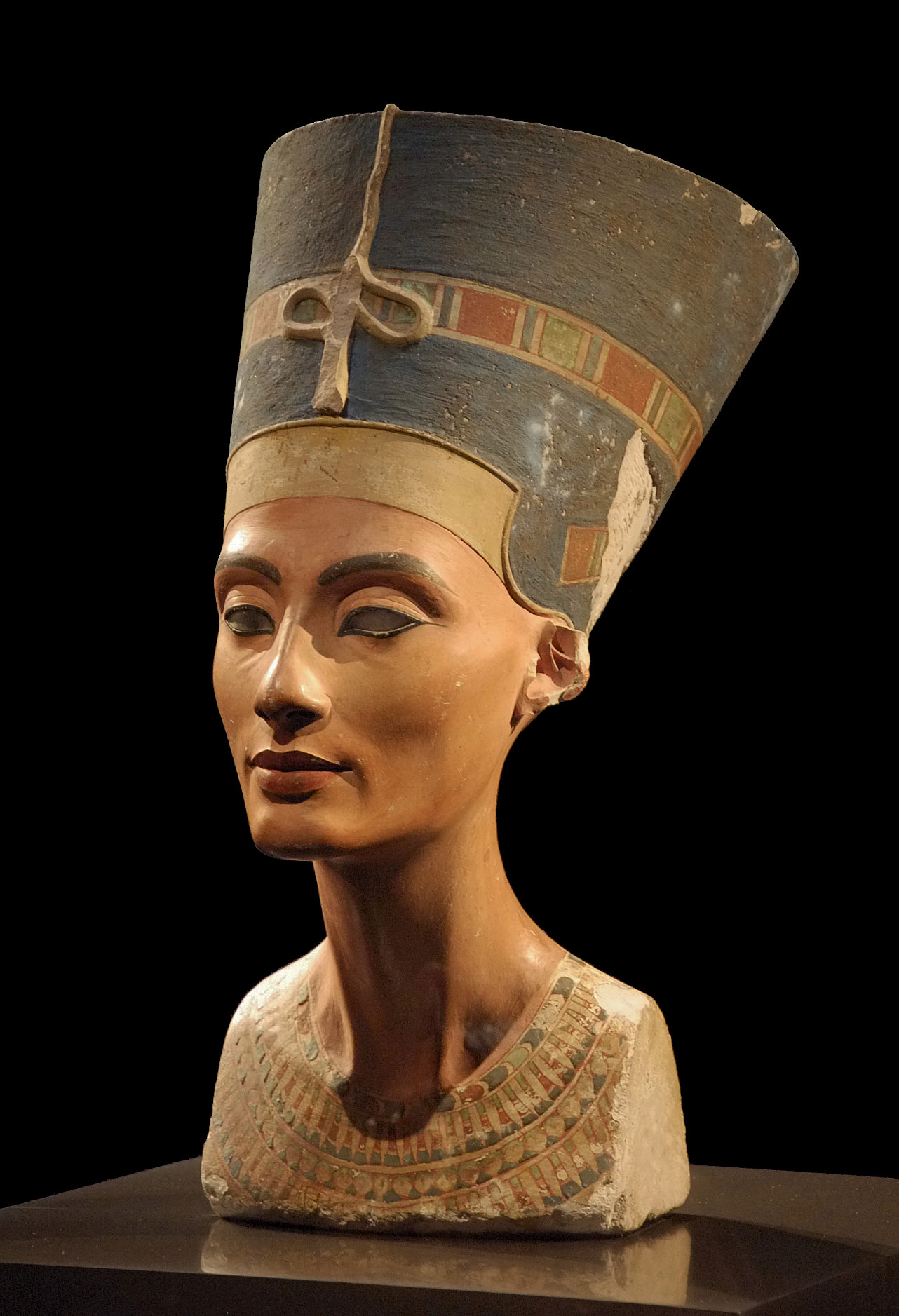
Nefertiti, or Neferneferauten-Nefertiti, wife of Akhenaten.

Evidence suggests that the royal family was worshipped alongside their god, the Aten. The Amarna period saw four reigning kings: Akhenaten, Smenkhkare, Neferneferauten, and Tutankhamun. The exact reigning periods and identities of Smenkhkare and Neferneferauten are debated, and some scholars have even suggested that Smenkhkare and Neferneferauten are the same person. A leading theory suggests Smenkhkare reigned as co-regent alongside Akhentaten towards the end of Akhenaten's reign, but any possibility of his sole reign has not been confirmed. Neferneferuaten was a female ruler, possibly Nefertiti, the wife of Akhenaten. The Amarna period ended under Tutankhamun, whose government re-instated the Egyptian pantheon and moved the capital to Memphis.

=== Royal women ===
The royal women of the Amarna period were essential to the Aten cult. With no heavenly goddesses in this monotheistic cult, the queens and princesses of Amarna often stood-in and were revered as goddesses themselves. Their prominence and influence is well represented in Amarna art. Unlike other queens and princesses throughout ancient Egypt, they are seen fighting like warriors and participating in religious ritual, which is unusual compared to other periods of Middle Kingdom art.

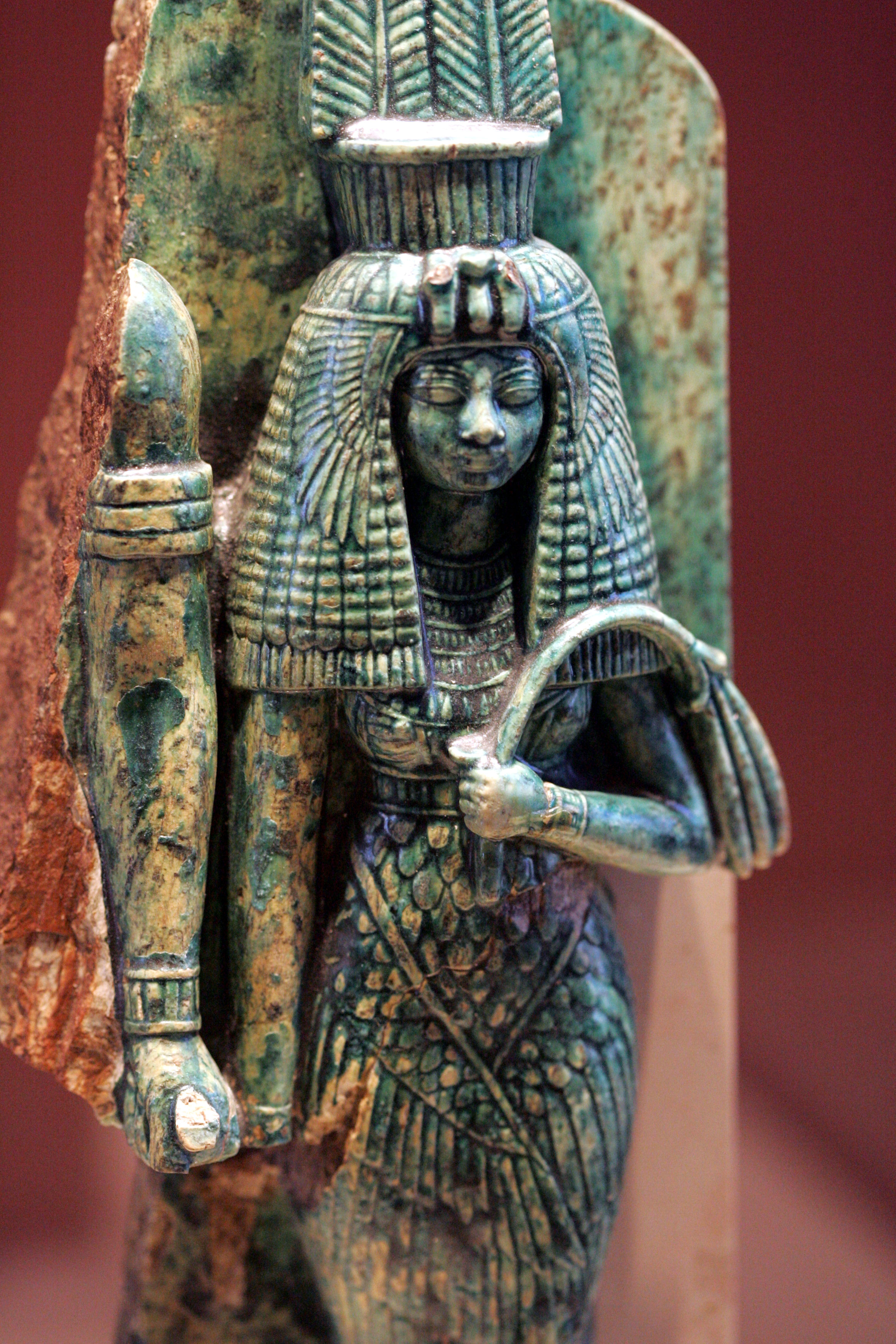
Queen Tiye, mother of Akhenaten and wife of Amenhotep III.

Nefertiti was Akhenaten's primary wife. Archaeological evidence suggests that when Amenhotep IV changed his name to Akhenaten in the fifth year of his reign, Nefertiti changed her name to Neferneferauten-Nefertiti. Unlike other ancient Egyptian queens, Nefertiti is shown performing rituals and acts of battle in Amarna period art, rather like a king. Some scholars have suggested that Nefertiti ascended to kingship status and ruled as co-regent early in Tutankhamun's reign as King Neferneferauten, while others suggest Neferneferauten ruled as co-regent at the end of Akhenaten's reign.

Queen Tiye was Akhenaten's mother and Amenhotep III's wife. During Amenhotep III's reign, Tiye was associated with the goddesses Hathor and Maat. She was often depicted behind her husband in art wearing a sun crown. Tiye outlived her husband and moved to the new capital, Akhet-Aten, with her son. This sun crown iconography continued into the Amarna period, where she is consistently depicted as an important member of Akhenaten's family.

=== Tutankhamun and the end of the Amarna kings ===
Tutankhamun, among the last of his dynasty and the Amarna kings, ascended to the throne at nine years old and died before he was twenty years old. Scholars debate when exactly the royal court returned to Thebes, though it is generally accepted to be quite early in Tutankhamun's reign.

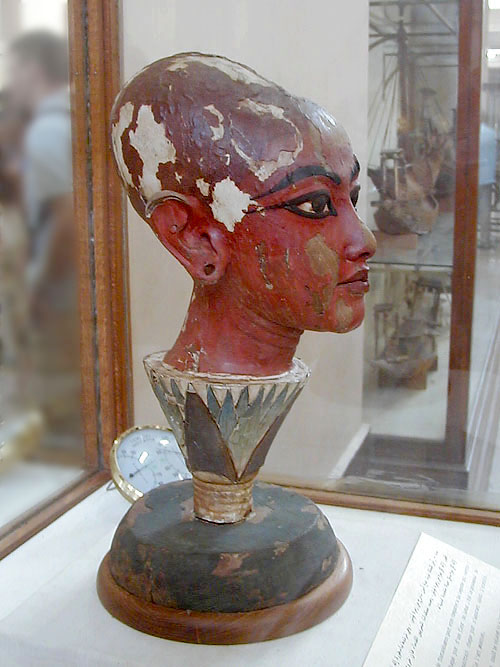
Tutankhamun, son of Akhenaten and an unknown mother (possibly the Younger Lady).

Akhenaten's royal line died out with Tutankhamun. Both of Tutankhamun's daughters predeceased him, and he died without an heir. Tutankhamun was thus succeeded by Ay. Ay's short reign of three years was followed by Horemheb, who ordered the city of Akhetaten torn down. Horemheb excised as much of the Amarna Period as he could from official histories and monuments, considering it an aberration. According to Horemheb's revised monuments, he directly succeeded Amenhotep III, essentially erasing 30 years of history.

== Art ==
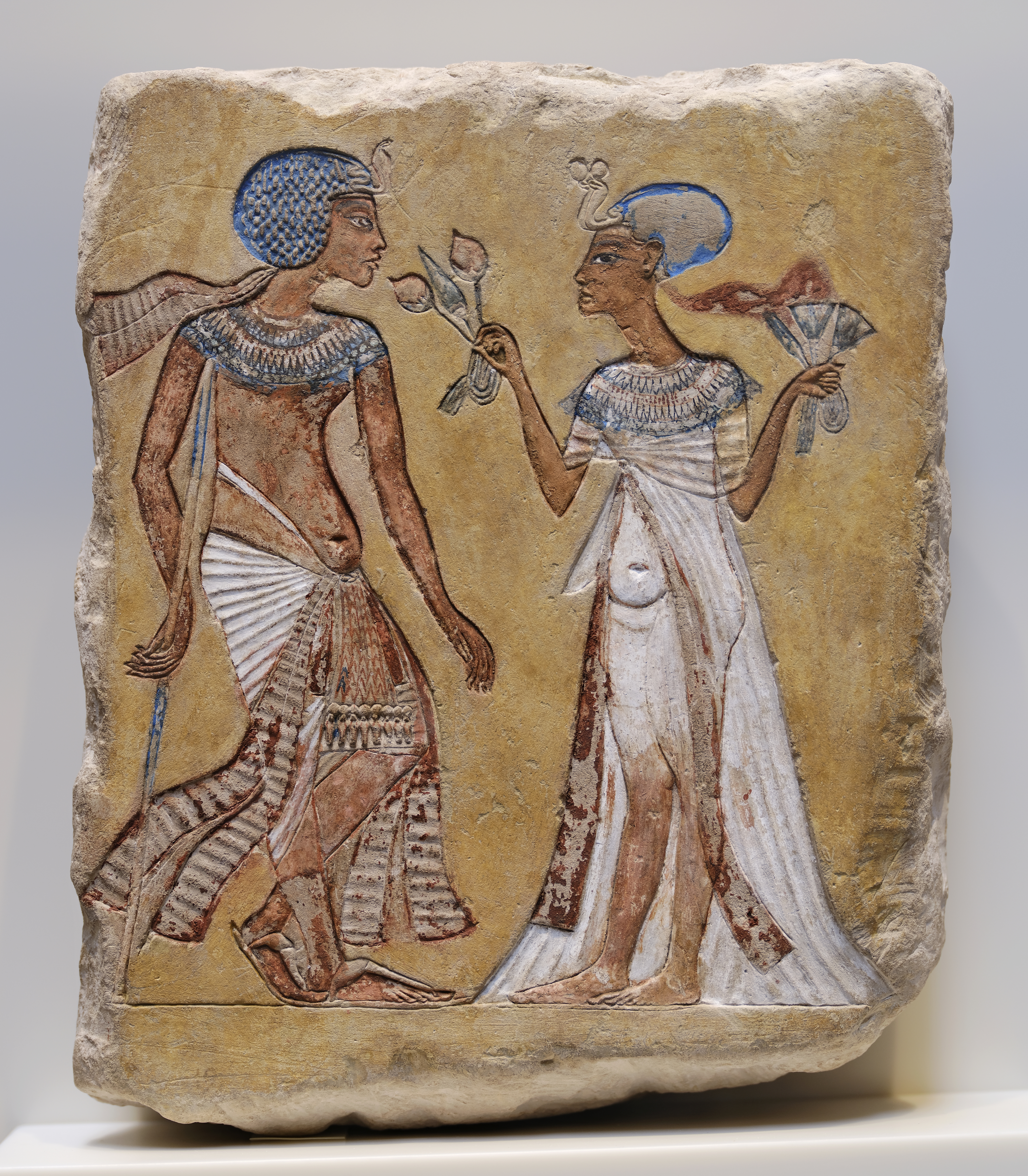
A relief of a royal couple in the Amarna-period style; figures may be Akhenaten and Nefertiti, Smenkhkare and Meritaten, or Tutankhamen and Ankhesenamun; Egyptian Museum of Berlin.

During Akhenaten's reign, royal portraiture underwent dramatic change. Sculptures of Akhenaten deviate from conventional portrayal of royalty. Akhenaten is depicted in an androgynous and highly stylized manner, with large thighs, a slim torso, drooping belly, full lips, and a long neck and nose. Some believe that the break with convention was due to "the presence at Amarna of new people or groups of artists whose background and training were different from those of the Karnak sculptors." Colossi and wall-reliefs from the Karnak Aten Temple are highly exaggerated and almost grotesque when compared to the Egyptian royal and elite art during the millennium preceding Akhenaten's birth. Art before Akhenaten was characterized by its formality and restraint, and shifted toward becoming stylized.

While Akhenaten is famous for the changes he made in the religious practices and art, there were also changes in temple architecture, building methods, and public inscriptions. He shifted to smaller blocks of stone set in a strong mortar in order to create his stone structure. Official inscriptions changed from the old-fashioned language used in traditional earlier periods to monumental texts to reflect the spoken language of the time.

== Foreign relations ==
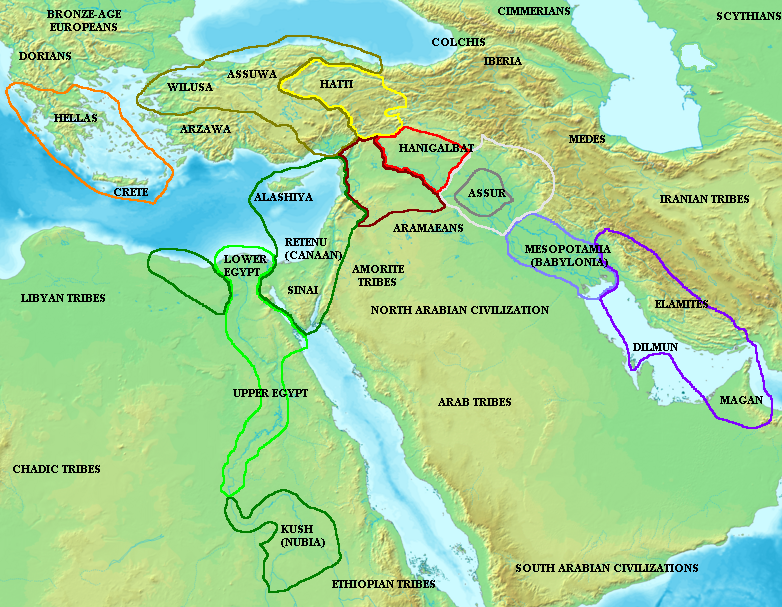
Map of the ancient Near East during the Amarna period, showing the great powers of the period: Egypt (green), Hatti (yellow), the Kassite kingdom of Babylon (purple), Assyria (grey), and Mittani (red). Lighter areas show direct control, darker areas represent spheres of influence. The extent of the Achaean/Mycenaean civilization is shown in orange.

The Amarna Letters feature correspondence among the rulers of several empires, dubbed by modern historians The Club of Great Powers: Babylon, Assyria, Mitanni and Hatti, viz. the major powers in Mesopotamia, the Levant and Anatolia during the Late Bronze Age.

=== The Great Powers ===
==== Babylon EA 1–11 ====
The extent of the Babylonian Empire during the Kassite dynasty

The Babylonians were conquered by an outside group of people and were referred to in the letters as Karaduniyas. Babylon was ruled by the Kassite dynasty which would later on assimilate to the Babylonian culture. The letters of correspondence between the two deal with various trivial things but it also contained one of the few messages from Egypt to another power. It was the pharaoh responding to the demands of King Kasashman-Enlil, who initially inquired about the whereabouts of his sister, who was sent for a diplomatic marriage. The king was hesitant to send his daughter for another diplomatic marriage until he knew the status of his sister. The pharaoh responds by politely telling the king to send someone who would recognize his sister. Then later correspondence dealt with the importance of exchanging of gifts namely the gold which is used in the construction of a temple in Babylonia. There was also a correspondence where the Babylonian king was offended by not having a proper escort for a princess. He wrote that he was distraught by how few chariots there were to transport her and that he would be shamed by the responses of the great kings of the region.

==== Assyria EA 15–16 ====
By the time of the Amarna letters, the Assyrians, who were originally a vassal state, had become an independent power. The two letters were from king Assur-uballit I. The first dealt with him introducing himself and sending a messenger to investigate Egypt: "He should see what you are like and what your country is like, and then leave for here." (EA 15) The second letter dealt with him inquiring as to why Egypt was not sending enough gold to him and arguing about profit for the king: "Then let him (a messenger) stay out and let him die right there in the sun, but for (but) for the king himself there must be a profit."

==== Mittani EA 17–30 ====
Once enemies, by the time of the Amarna letters, the Mittanni had become an ally of Egypt's. These letters were written by the King Tuiseratta and dealt with various topics, such as preserving and renewing marriage alliances, and sending in various gifts. For example, EA 22 and EA 25 in the Amarna letters are an inventory of the gifts from the Mittani king Tusratta to the pharaoh. Other correspondences of note dealt with a gold statue that was addressed in EA 26 and EA 27. Akhenaten married a Mittani princess in order to create stronger ties between the two nations.

==== Hatti EA 41–44 ====
Hatti was a kingdom in central Anatolia that would later make Mitanni their vassal state. The correspondence from the Hatti comes from a king called Suppiluliuma. The subjects of the letters varied, from discussing past alliances to gift-giving and dealing with honor. In EA 42, the tablet stated how the Hittite king was offended by the name of the pharaoh written over his name. Although the ending of the text was very fragmented, it was discerned as saying that he will blot out the name of the pharaoh.

=== Amarna Letters ===
==== The opening statement ====
The opening statement:

— Say to Nibmuareya, the king of Egypt, my brother: Thus Tuiseratta, the King of Mittani, your brother. For me all goes well. For you may all go well. For Kelu-Heba may all go well. For your household, for your wives, for your sons, for your magnates, for your warriors, for your horses, for your chariots, and in your country, may all go very well.

William Moran discussed how the first line in these documents followed a consistent formula of "Say to PN. Thus PN." There are variations of this but was found common among all the tablets. The other is a salutation which is one a report of the monarch's well-being and then the second which is a series of good wishes toward the monarch. Indeed, this seems to be part of the style of Akkadian style of writing which helped facilitate foreign correspondence for the long term. As scholars argued, this aided in filtering out the chauvinistic domestic ideology at home to the other monarch. This allowed diplomacy to flourish which aided to the relative peace of the time.

==== Brotherhood ====
Despite the great distances between the rulers, the concept of a global village reigned.

As is seen in EA 7:

— From the time the messenger of my brother arrived here, I have not been well, and so on no occasion has his messenger eaten food and drunk spirits in my company. If you ask... your messenger, he will tell you that I have not been well and that, as far as my recovery is concerned, I am still by no means restored to health.... I for my part became angry with my brother, saying, has my brother not heard that I am ill? Why has he shown me no concern? Why has he sent no messenger here and visited me?

The importance of this in EA 7 is that it demonstrates the mindset of the rulers in the Near East world at the time. The "enlarged village" which scholars like to term permeated their thoughts where they took the idea of brotherhood. They were related through the political marriages but is an idea of a village of clans which gives reason to the good wishes and update on the health of the monarchs themselves. The monarchs seem to have very little concept of the time of travel between each other and at most likely saw that the village worldview they lived in was applicable for the long distant correspondence of the Amarna letters. Indeed, there is a constant demonstration of love as seen in these letters. Scholars pointed out that to demonstrate good friendship it had to be on the practical level of constant stream of gift giving. This request for gifts is constant with the various correspondence with the Great Kings.

== Gallery ==
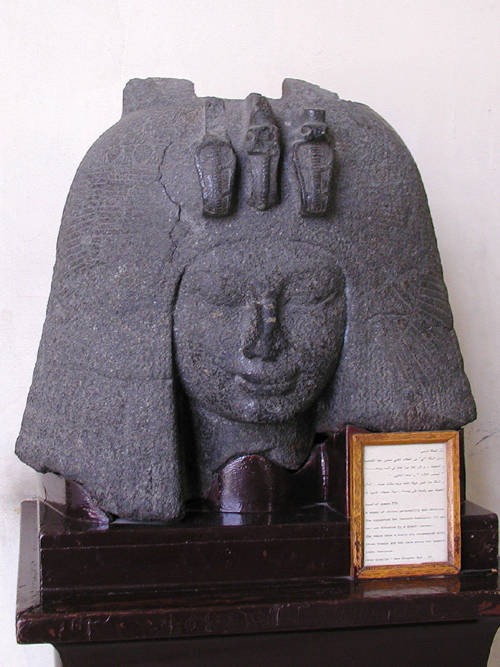
Queen Tiye, matriarch of the Amarna Dynasty. She was the mother of Akhenaten and wife of Amenhotep III. She mainly ran Egypt's affairs of state for her son.

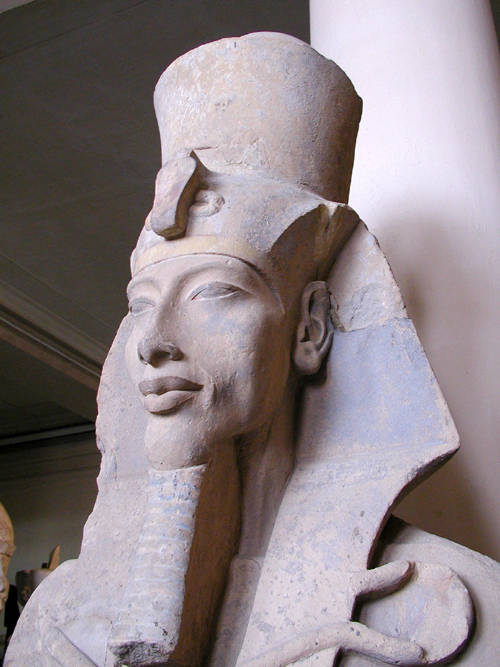
Akhenaten, born Amenhotep IV, began a religious revolution in which he declared Aten was a supreme god and turned his back on the old traditions. He moved the capital to Akhetaten.

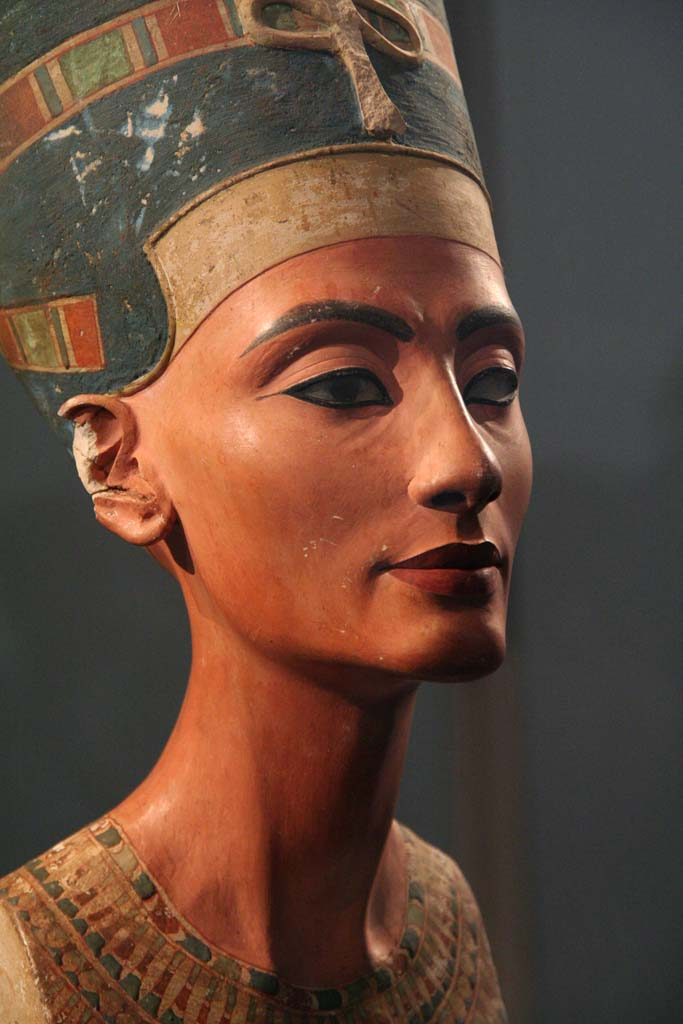
Queen Nefertiti, the daughter of Ay, married Akhenaten. Her role in daily life at the court soon extended from Great Royal Wife to that of a co-regent. It is also possible that she may have ruled Egypt in her own right as pharaoh, Neferneferuaten.

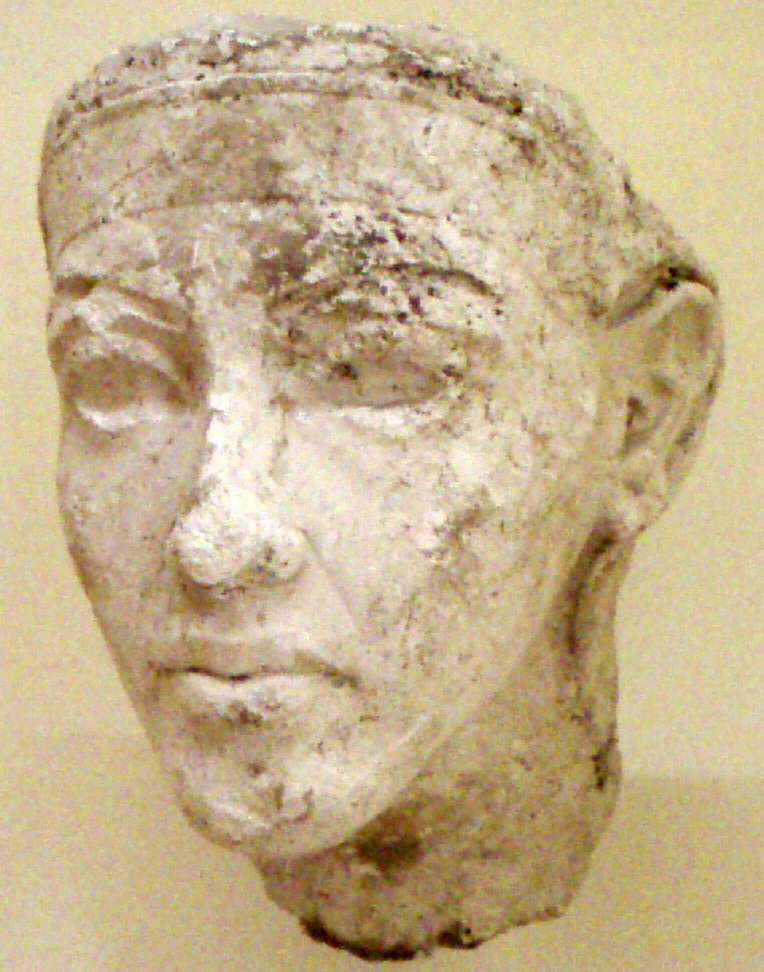
Smenkhkare, was a co-regent of Akhenaten who ruled after his death. It was believed that Smenkhkare was a male guise of Nefertiti. However, it is accepted that Smenkhkare was a male. He took Meritaten, Queen Nefertiti's daughter as his wife.

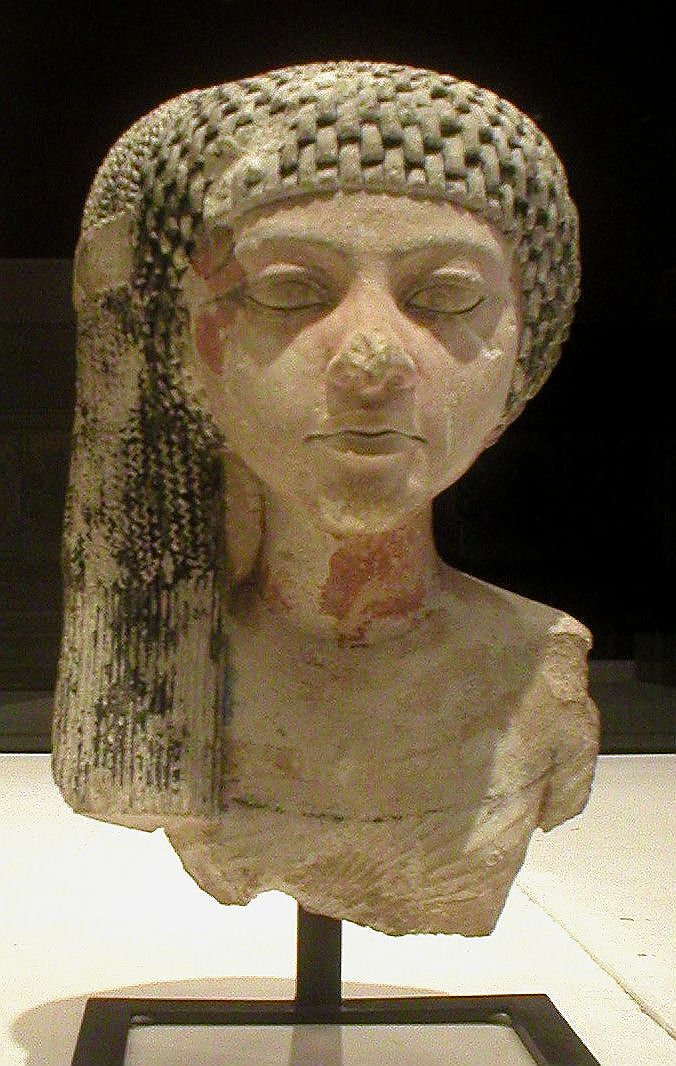
Queen Meritaten, was the oldest daughter of Akhenaten and Nefertiti. She was the wife of Smenkhkare. She also may have ruled Egypt in her own right as pharaoh and is one of the possible candidates for being the pharaoh, Neferneferuaten.

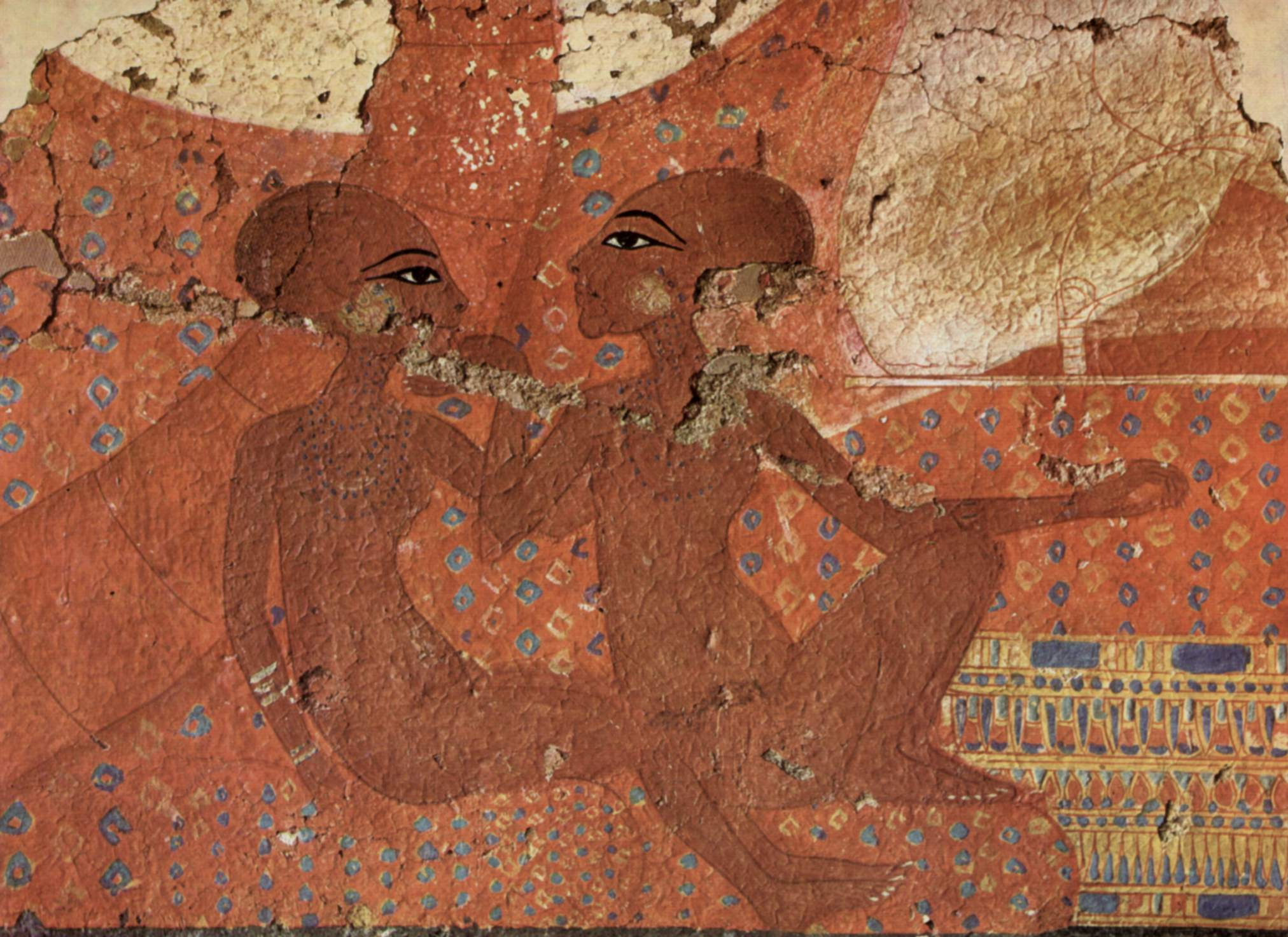
Neferneferure and Neferneferuaten Tasherit. Shown here as children, they were two of six daughters born to Akhenaten and Nefertiti. It is possible that Neferneferuaten Tasherit was the one who may have been her father's co-regent and may have ruled as the female pharaoh, Neferneferuaten.

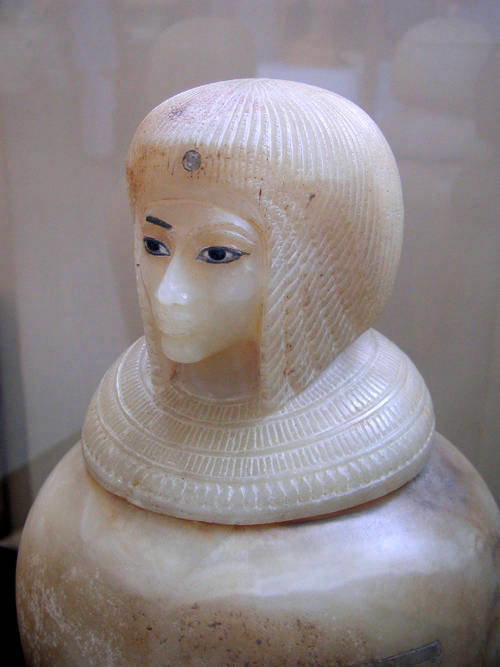
Canopic jar lid of Kiya. She was one of Akhenaten's secondary wives. It was once believed that she was the mother of Tutankhamun, but that was proven not the case when DNA revealed it not so.

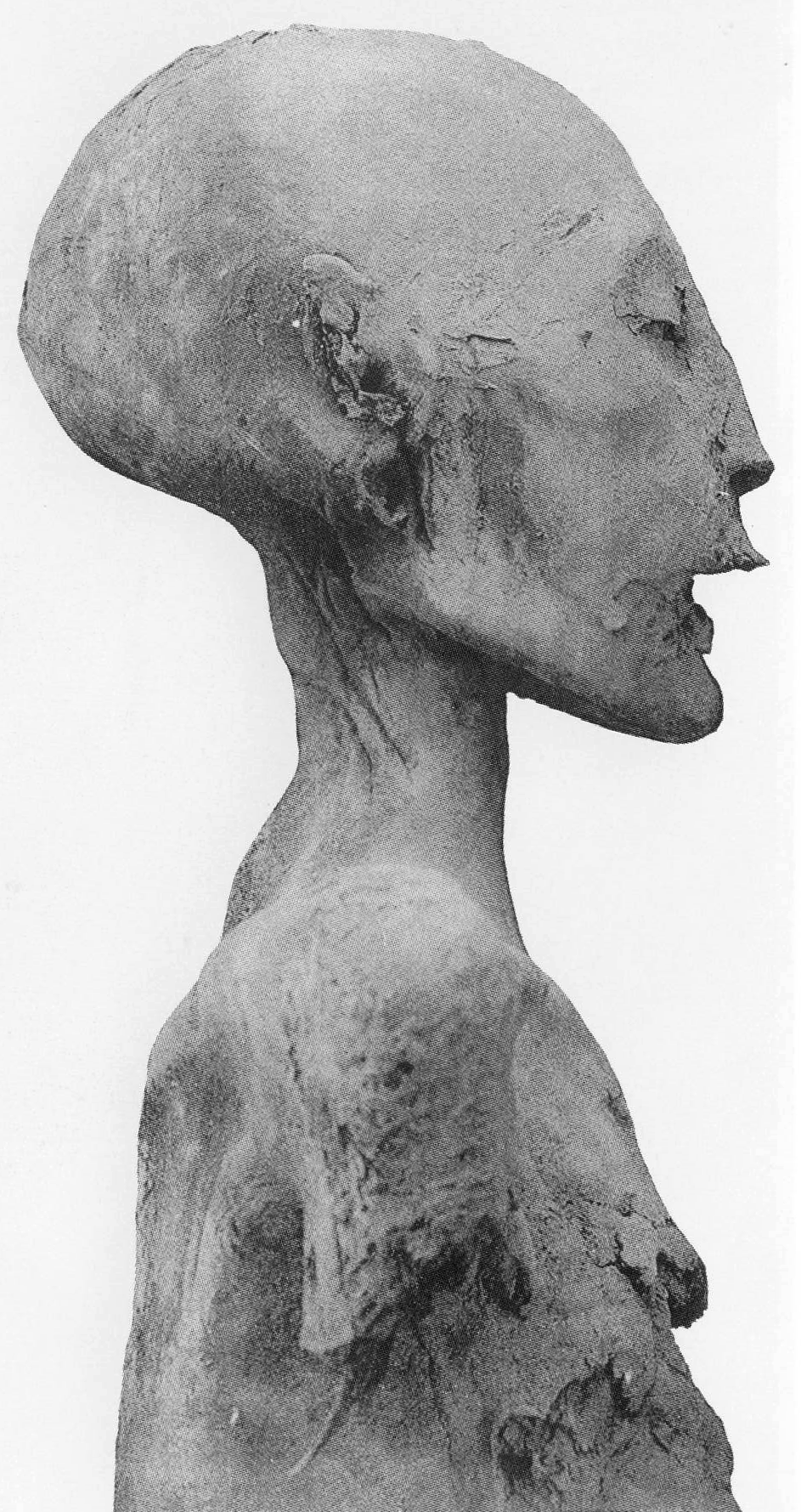
The Younger Lady mummy of KV35 was by DNA matching Tutankhamun's mother. Originally thought to be Nefertiti, DNA showed that she was the sister of Akhenaten. Princess Nebetah or Beketaten are considered candidates.

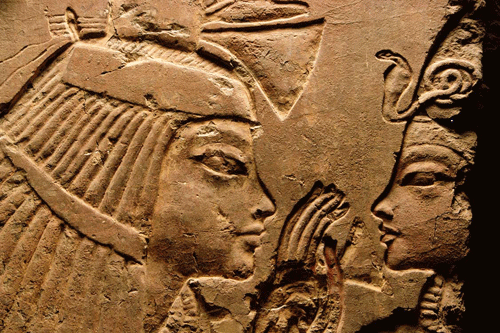
Maia was the wet nurse of the Crown Prince, Tutankhamun. Having lost his mother at a young age, she helped rear the young prince. Maia was later allowed to have a grand tomb at Saqqara. Here the young prince holds her hand.

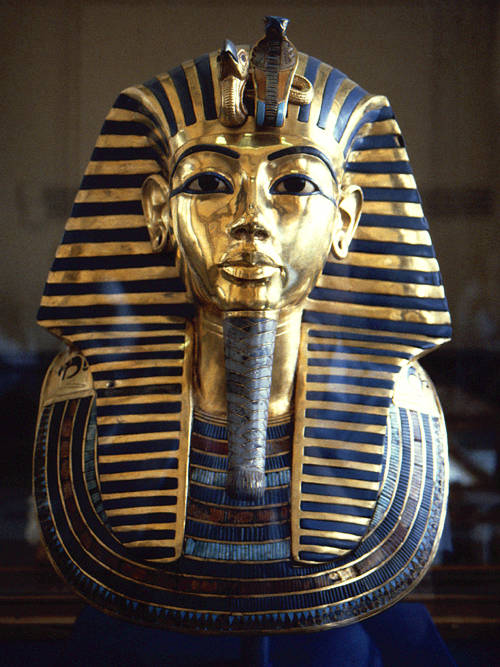
Tutankhamun, formerly Tutankhaten, was Akhenaten's son through an incestuous relationship with his sister. As pharaoh, he instigated policies to restore Egypt to its old religion and moved the capital back to Thebes.

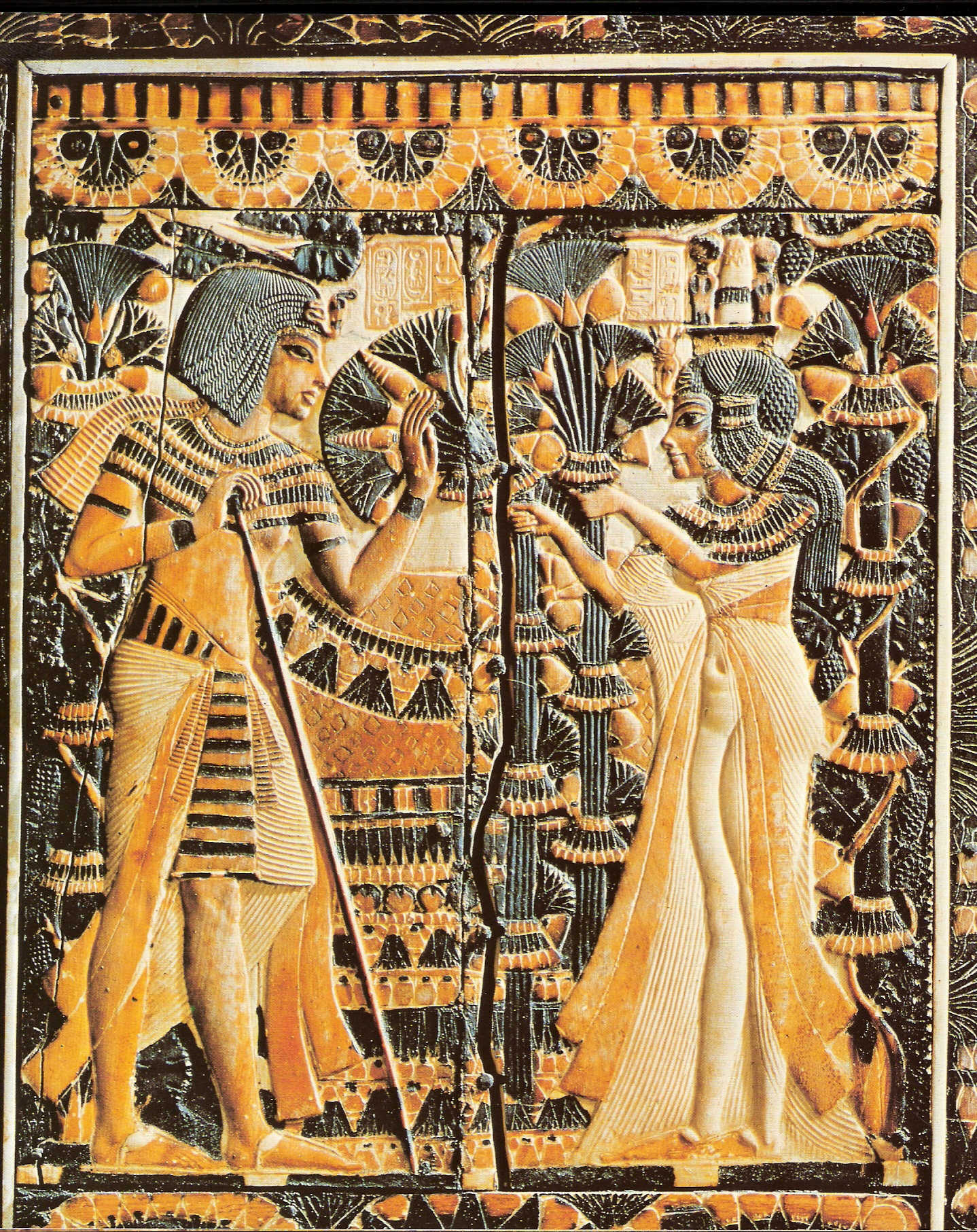
Ankhesenamun, born Ankhesenpaaten, was the wife of Tutankhamun, and daughter of Akhenaten. After her husband's death, she was married to her maternal grandfather Ay.

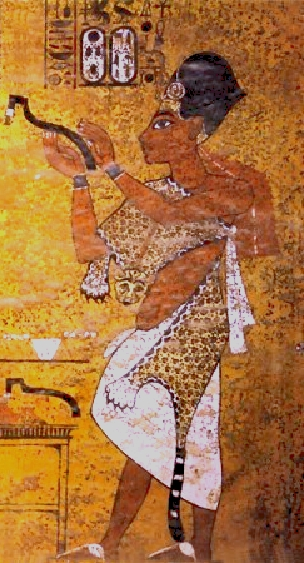
Ay served as vizier to Akhenaten, and Tutankhamun. He was the father of Nefertiti. After the death of Tutankhamun, Ay lay a claim to the throne by burying him and by marrying his granddaughter Ankhesenamun.

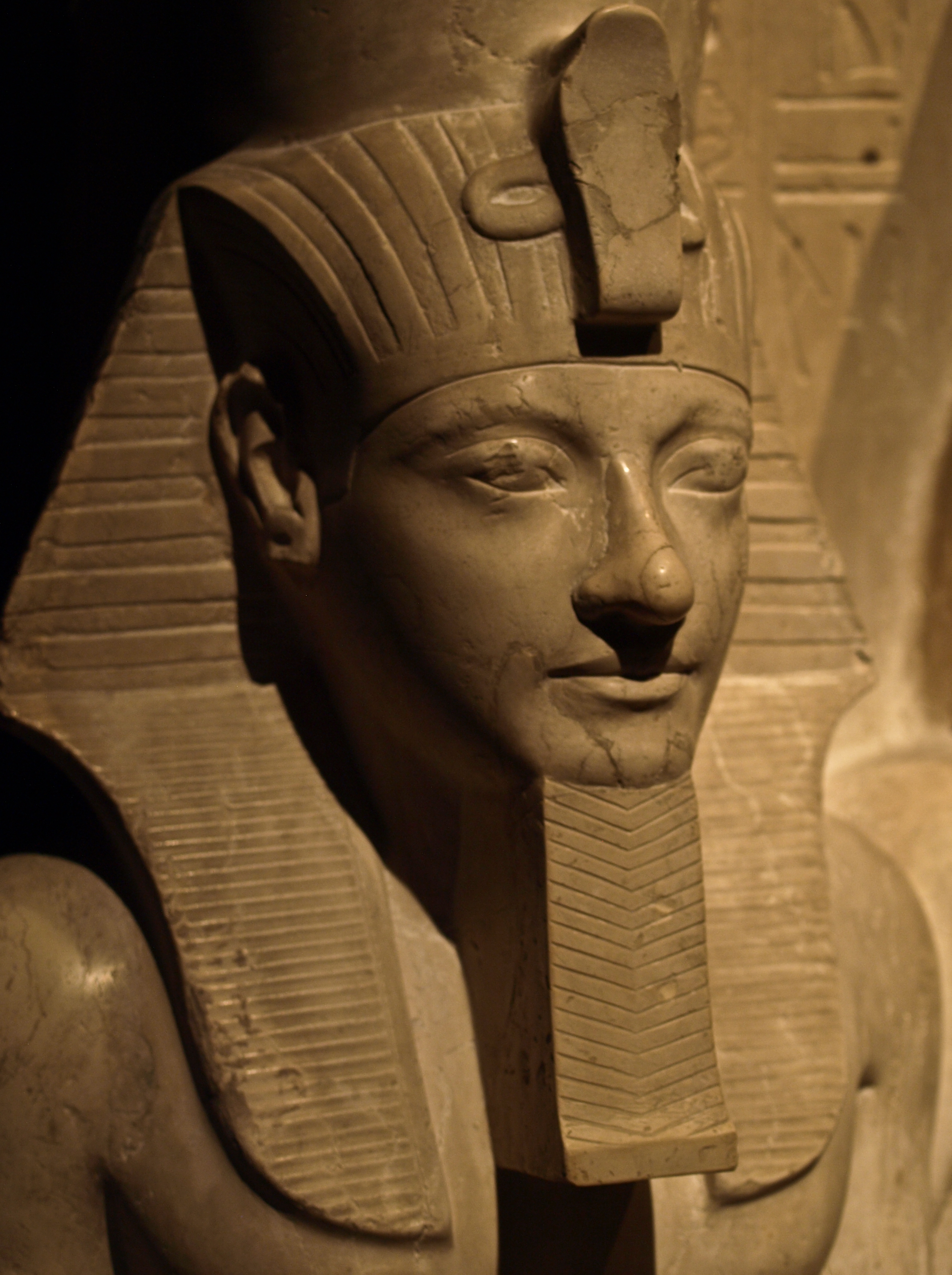
After the death of Ay, Horemheb assumed the throne. A commoner, he had served as vizier to both Tutankhamun and Ay. Horemheb instigated a policy of damnatio memoriae, against everyone associated with the Amarna period. He was married to Nefertiti's sister, Mutnodjmet, who died in child birth. With no heir, he appointed his own vizier, Paramessu as his successor.

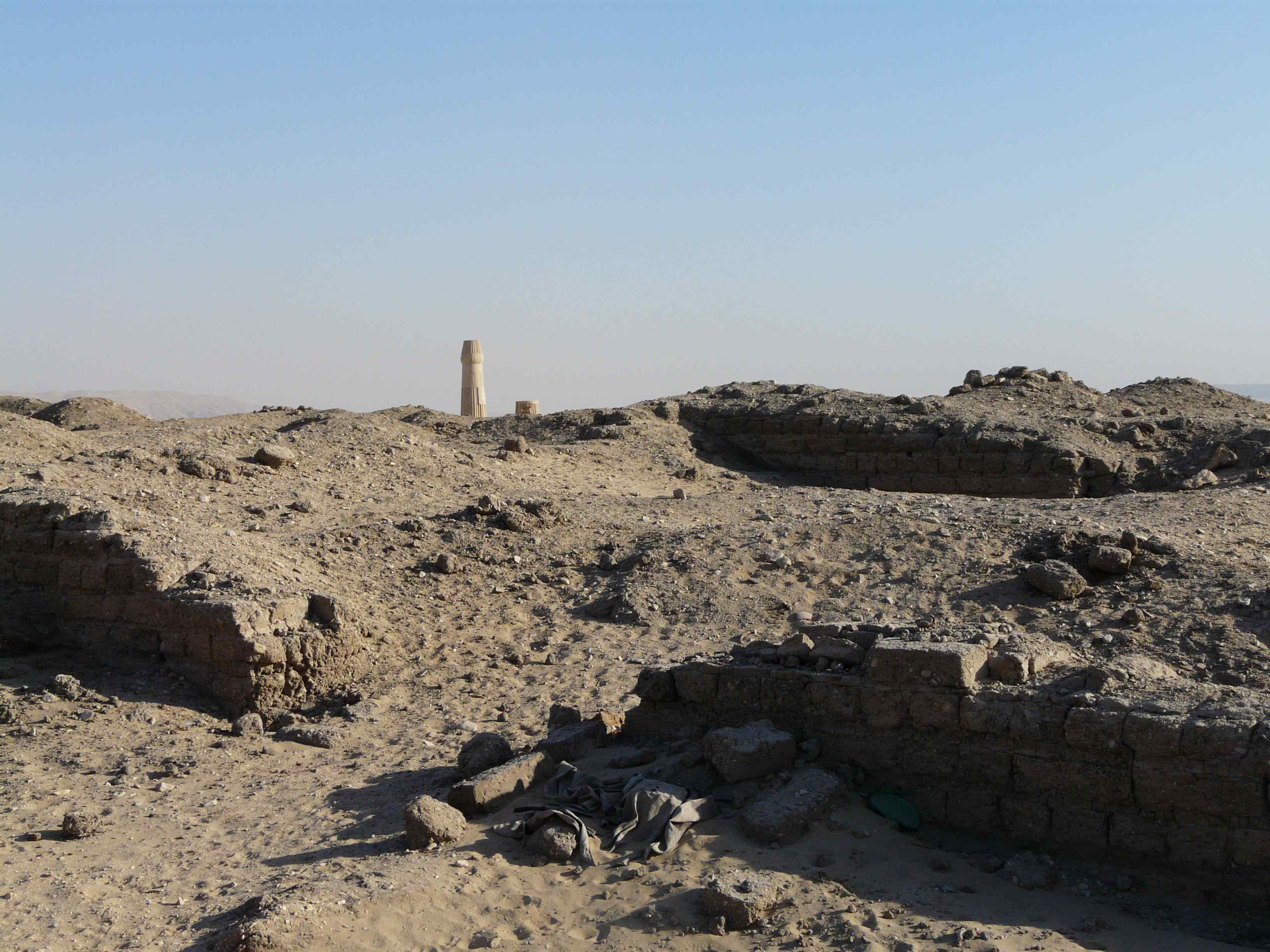
The ruins of Akhetaten. Now commonly called Amarna, Akhenaten's capital city was abandoned by Tutankhamun. It survived several years before being torn apart by Horemheb's orders.

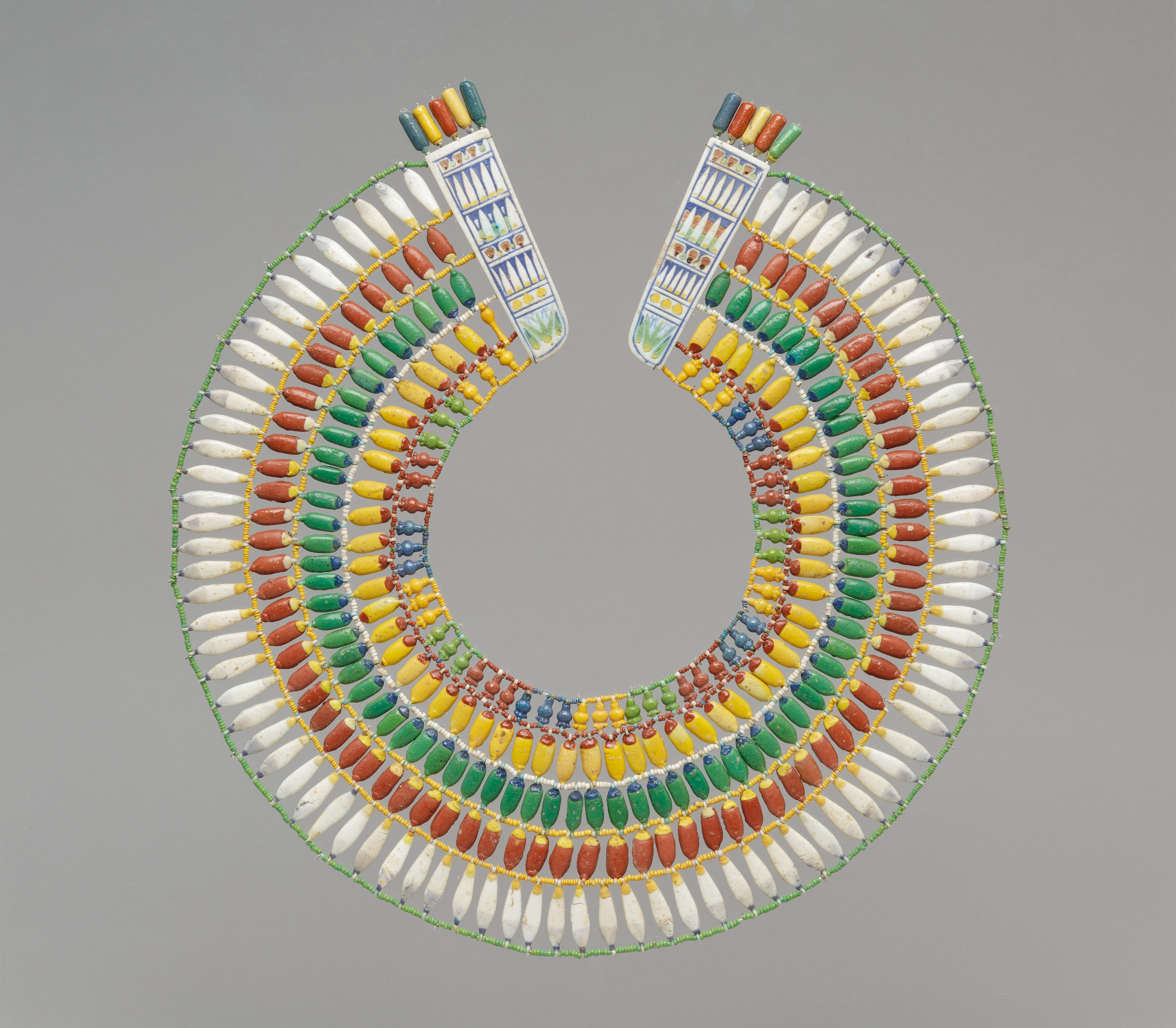
Faience Broad Collar from the Amarna period

== Notes ==
=== References ===
- Cohen, Raymond; Westbrook, Raymond (2000). Amarna Diplomacy: the Beginnings of International Relations. Baltimore, MD: Johns Hopkins University Press. ISBN 0-8018-6199-3.
- Moran, William L. (1992). The Amarna Letters. Baltimore, MD: Johns Hopkins University Press. ISBN 0-8018-4251-4.

== Bibliography ==
- Aldred, Cyril (1991) [1988]. Akhenaten, King of Egypt. London: Thames and Hudson. ISBN 0500276218.
- Arnold, Dieter (2003) [1994]. Strudwick, Nigel; Strudwick, Helen (eds.). The Encyclopaedia of Ancient Egyptian Architecture (English language ed.). London: I.B. Tauris. ISBN 1-86064-465-1.
- Breasted, James Henry, ed. (2001) [1906]. Ancient Records of Egypt. Vol. 2 (Paperback ed.). Urbana; Chicago: University of Illinois Press. ISBN 0-252-06974-9.
- Dodson, Aidan (2014). Amarna Sunrise: Egypt from the Golden Age to Age of Heresy (1st ed.). Cairo; New York: The American University in Cairo Press. ISBN 978-9774166334.
- Redford, Donald B. (May 2013). "Akhenaten: New Theories and Old Facts". Bulletin of the American Schools of Oriental Research. 369 (369). American Schools of Oriental Research: 9–34. doi:10.5615/bullamerschoorie.369.0009. ISSN 0003-097X. JSTOR 10.5615/bullamerschoorie.369.000. OCLC 05748058.
- Ridley, Ronald Thomas (2019). Akhenaten: A Historian's View. The AUC History of Ancient Egypt. Cairo; New York: The American University in Cairo Press. ISBN 978-9774167935.
- Shaw, Ian, ed. (2003) [2000]. The Oxford History of Ancient Egypt (New ed.). Oxford; New York: Oxford University Press. ISBN 978-0-19-280458-7.
