= Beketaten =

Ancient Egyptian 18th Dynasty princess

- King's Daughter
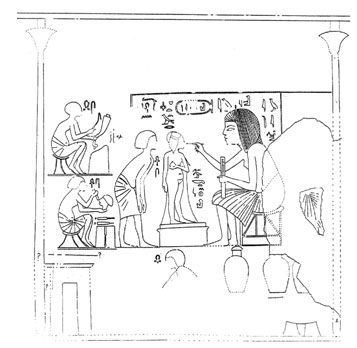
- Queen Tiye's sculptor Yuti finishes a statue of Beketaten. From the Amarna tomb of Huya
- Burial: KV35 if The Younger Lady
Egyptian name
i t n ra G29 t B1
- Dynasty: 18th Dynasty
- Father: Amenhotep III or Akhenaten
- Mother: Tiye or Kiya

Beketaten (Ancient Egyptian: bꜣk.t-itn) (14th century BCE) was an ancient Egyptian princess of the 18th Dynasty. Beketaten is considered to be the youngest daughter of Pharaoh Amenhotep III and his Great Royal Wife Tiye, thus the sister of Pharaoh Akhenaten. Her name means "Handmaid of Aten".

== Family ==
Beketaten was most likely the youngest daughter of Amenhotep III and Tiye. This would mean their other children were her siblings, including Prince Thutmose, the Pharaoh Akhenaten, Sitamun, Isis, Henuttaneb, and Nebetah. Some scholars have speculated that Nebetah was identical with Beketaten. However, no evidence proves that they are the same person.

It has also been suggested that she might be the daughter of Akhenaten and his secondary wife, Kiya. Kiya is shown on a few occasions with a princess whose name ends in -aten. However, the full name of the princess has been lost. It has been speculated that this daughter is Beketaten partially because Beketaten was never named King's Sister in the scenes from Amarna, but only King's Bodily Daughter. After the death of her mother, Beketaten may have been raised by Tiye. Because a wine docket of Year 13 mentions Beketaten, it has been proposed that she inherited Kiya's estates after her death.

However, since Kiya was still alive in the seventeenth year of Akhenaten's reign, that is, Tiye died long before her, the conjecture that her daughter was given to Tiye to raise after Kiya's death is extremely unlikely to hold. However, according to the theory proposed by Cabrol, Beketaten could still be Kiya's daughter, except that the time at which she was given to Tiye to raise was when Kiya changed from being the wife of Amenhotep III to being the wife of Akhenaten. In this case, Beketaten was evidently not the girl who frequently appears together with her mother; that princess probably did not have a name containing aten—the aten element is merely a remnant of the name of the monument usurper Meritaten. According to the very strange way in which Meritaten's name was written, and the very strange title "Beloved of her Father", which appears only in usurpation contexts and is semantically redundant with the adjacent title "Beloved of him", Perepelkin believes that the daughter of Kiya and Akhenaten was named Meritites.

Cabrol suggests that if Kiya was indeed Tadukhepa, then Beketaten may have had multiple fathers and multiple mothers, without needing to choose a single couple from among the candidates. Since Tadukhepa had two husbands, Amenhotep III and Akhenaten, Beketaten may have been the daughter of Kiya/Tadukhepa and Amenhotep III. Later, when Kiya became Akhenaten's wife, Beketaten thereby became the stepdaughter of her brother. Therefore, although in all records she displays characteristics of being Akhenaten's sister, she is never called the king's sister. When she appears with Tiye, her titles also contain no text indicating from which queen she was born: since her mother was Akhenaten's wife, it would have been highly inappropriate for her to be called Akhenaten's sister, and when Tiye began to raise her husband's youngest daughter, it was highly inappropriate for the princess to be marked as having another mother, who was both another wife of Tiye's husband and a daughter-in-law of Tiye.

== Appearance in Amarna Tomb 1 ==
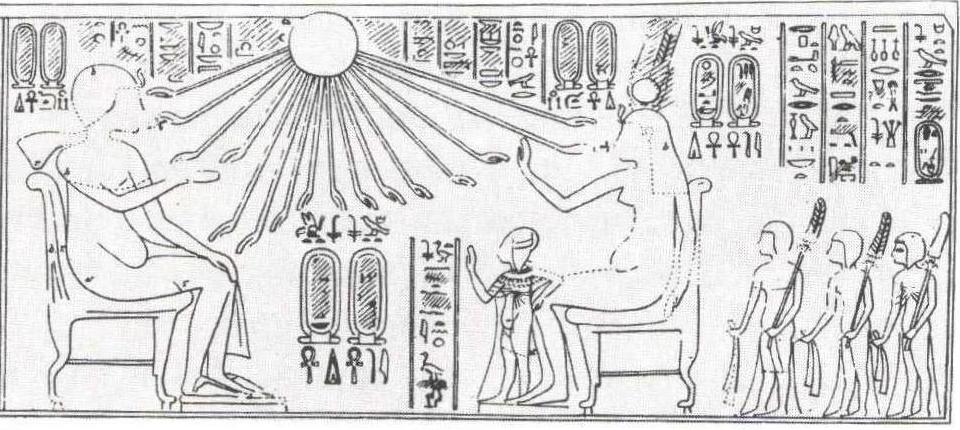
Amenhotep III, Tiye, and Beketaten.

Beketaten is only known from the Amarna tomb of Huya, who was Queen Tiye's steward. She is depicted in two scenes. In the first, Queen Tiye is shown seated opposite Pharaoh Akhenaten and Queen Nefertiti. In one scene Beketaten is shown seated on a small chair next to her mother Tiye, and in the other banquet scene Beketaten is shown standing next to Tiye. On the east wall of Huya's tomb Akhenaten is shown leading his mother Tiye to a temple. They are accompanied by Beketaten as they enter the temple.

The lintel on the North Wall shows a depiction of the two royal families. On the right side Amenhotep III is shown seated opposite Queen Tiye, who is accompanied by the princess Beketaten. Three female attendants are shown behind Tiye.

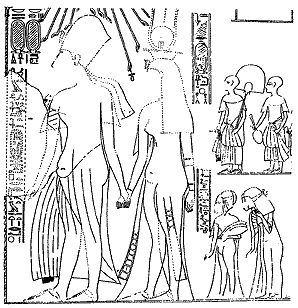
Akhenaten and his mother Tiye. Beketaten stands behind Tiye.

== Death and association with The Younger Lady ==
It is likely that she died young since she is not mentioned in the historical records after Queen Tiye's death. She has been considered as a candidate for the identity of the mummy known as The Younger Lady. The Younger Lady has been identified as daughter of Amenhotep III and Tiye and the mother of Tutankhamun. In 2024, based on archaeological and scientific evidence, the Egyptologist Martin Bommas identified the father of Tutankhamun as Smenkhkare and his mother as Beketaten, The Younger Lady.
