= Huya (noble) =

Ancient Egyptian noble

F18 Y1 i i A A52
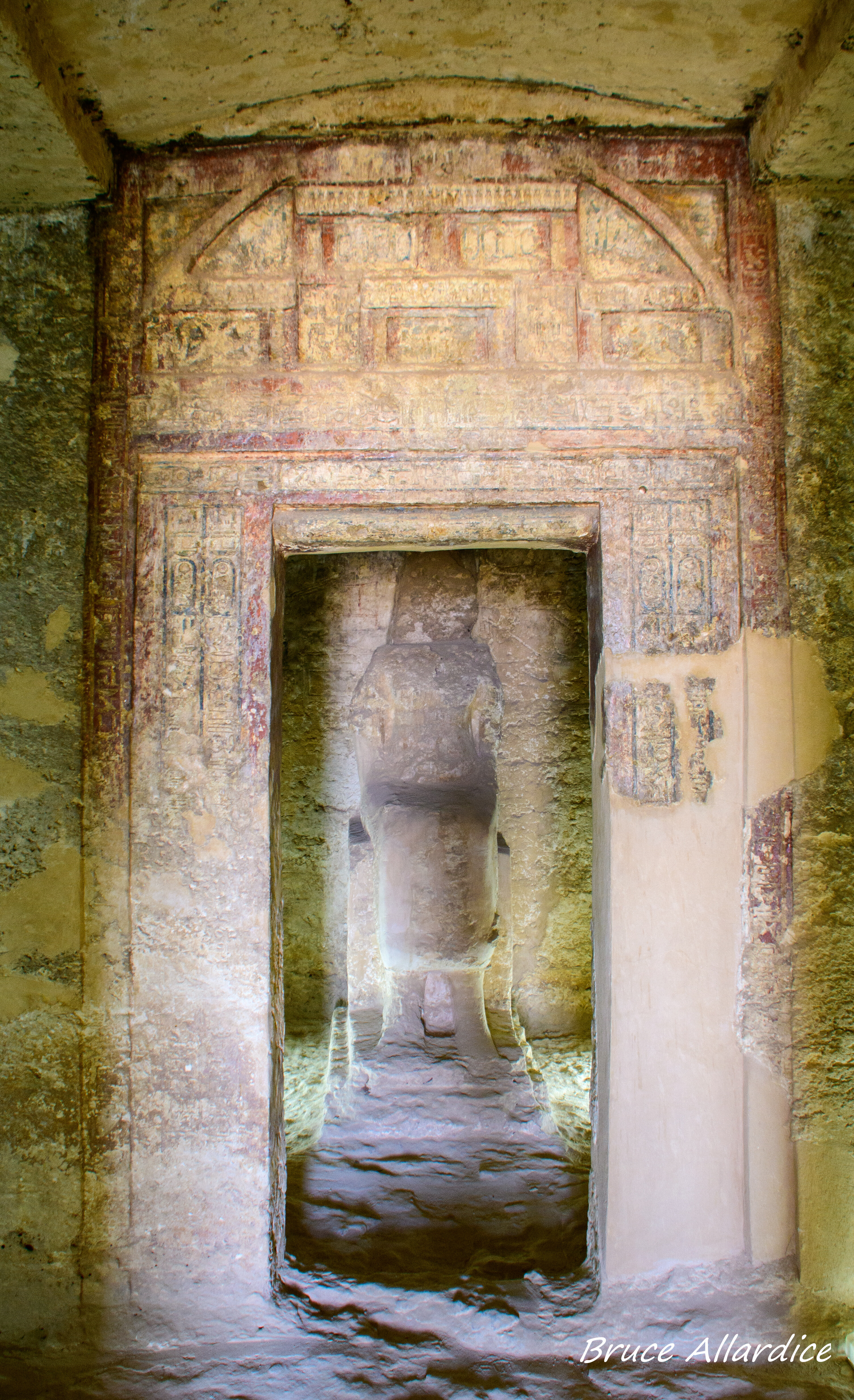
- A statue of Huya in his tomb
- Years active: c. 1350 BC
- Spouse: Wenher
- Children: Tiye and Anen
- Parent: Tuy

Huya (Ancient Egyptian: ḥi.ꜣ; fl. c. 1350 BC) was an Egyptian noble. He was the "Superintendent of the Royal Harem", "Superintendent of the Treasury" and "Superintendent of the House", all titles that are associated with Queen Tiye, mother of Amenhotep IV.

He had a tomb--Amarna Tomb 1--constructed in the Northern cemetery at Amarna, although his remains have never been identified. His tomb contained a large amount of material about the royal family and the Aten cult, including a Hymn to the Aten.

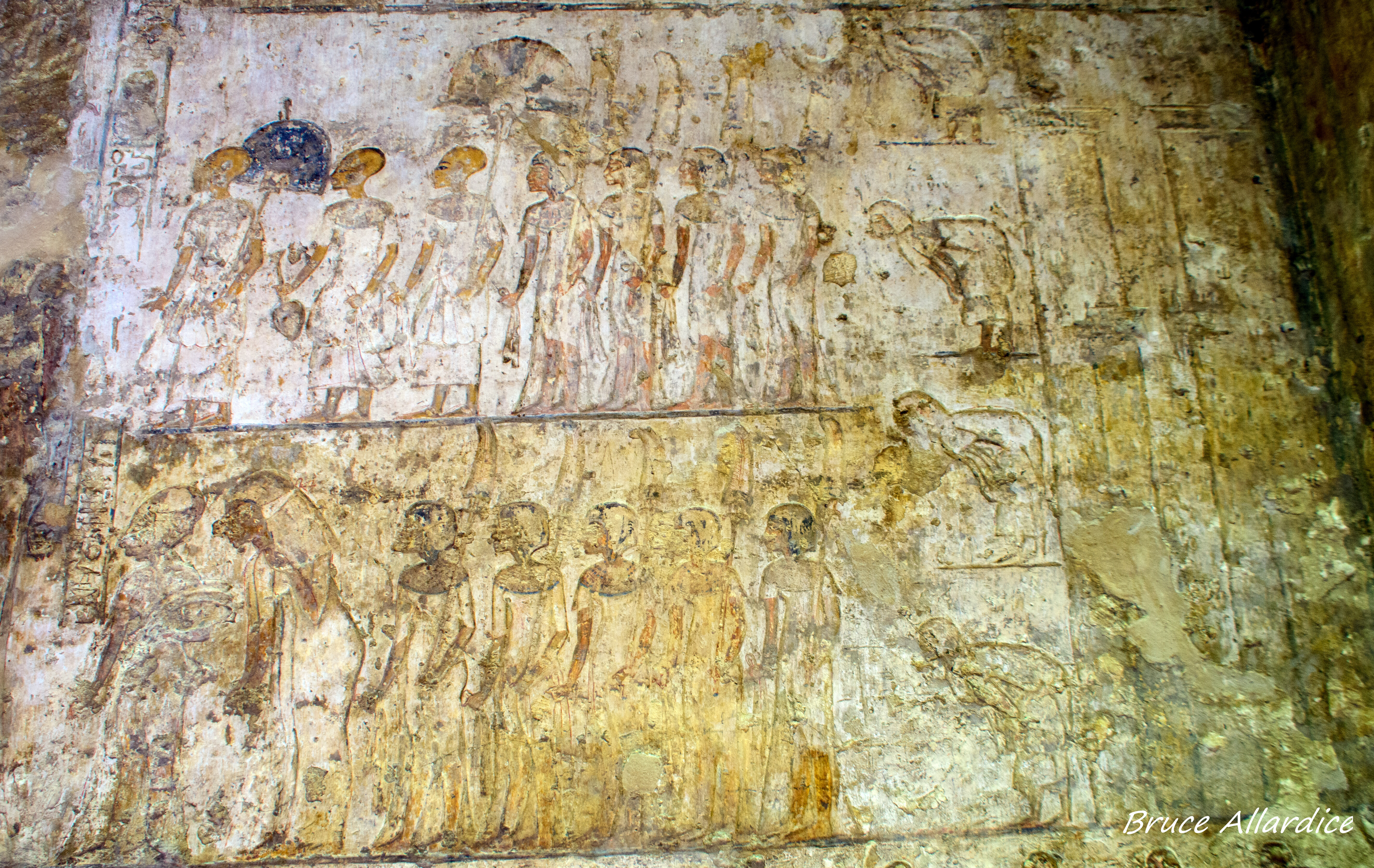
Princess Beketaten at the lower left register of Huya's tomb

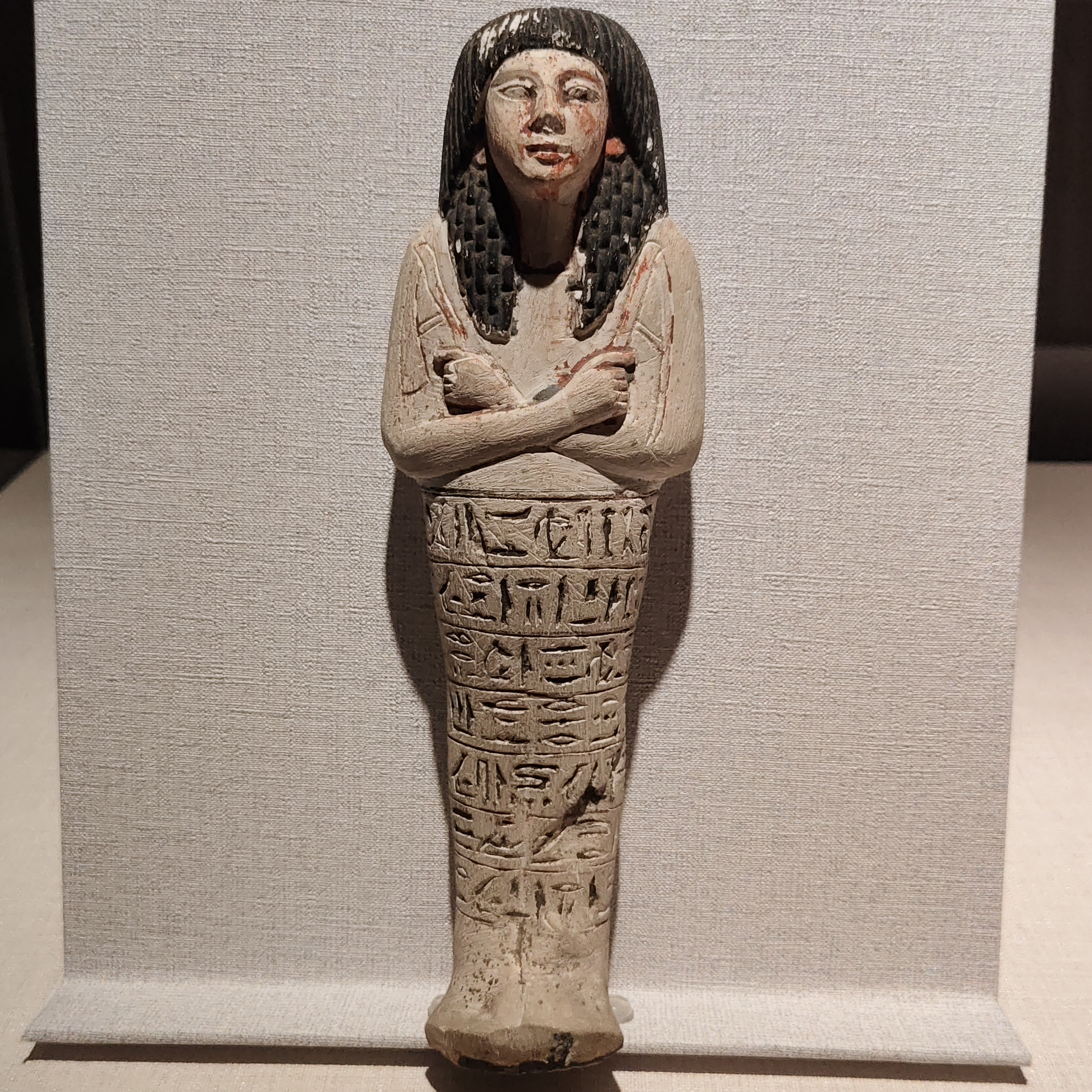
Shabti of Huya
