= Amarna Tomb 1 =

Ancient Egyptian tomb at Amarna

Amarna Tomb Northern tomb 1
- Burial site of Huya
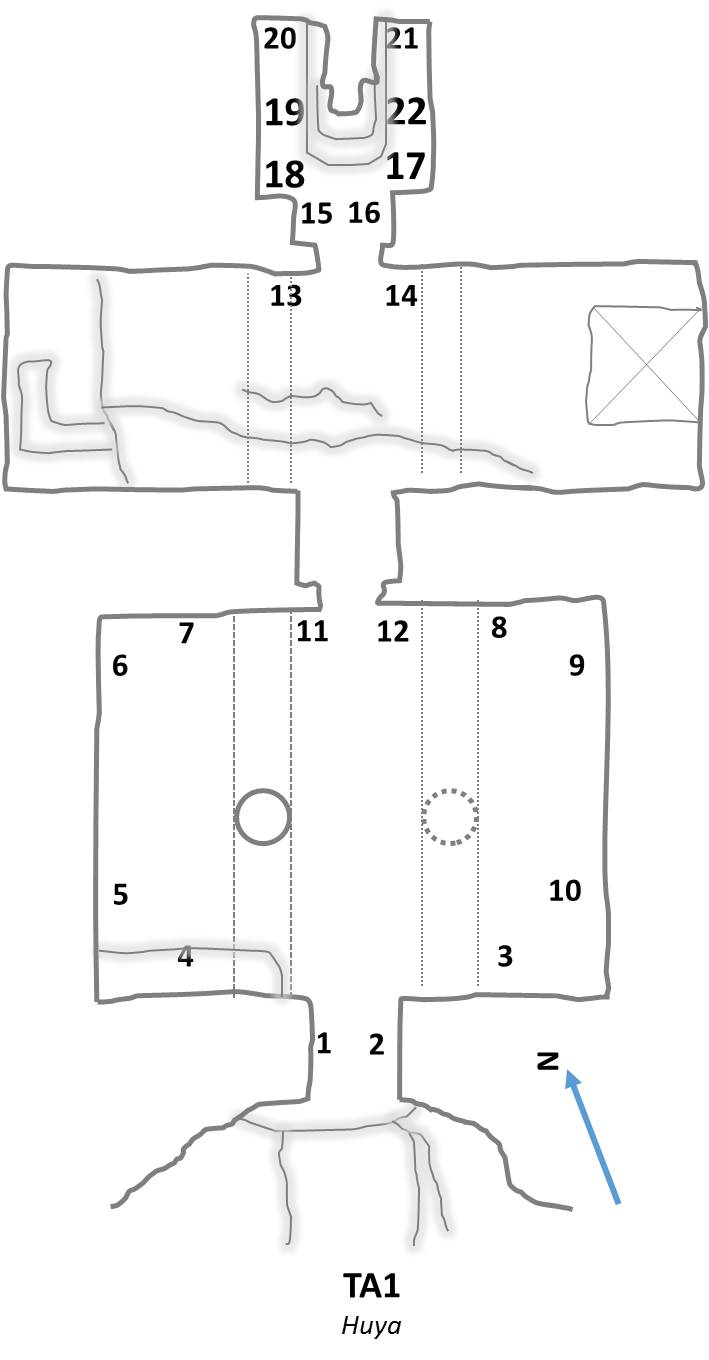
- Plan of Amarna Tomb 1

- Location within Egypt
- Coordinates: 27°39′42″N 30°54′20″E
- Location: Northern tombs of the Nobles, Amarna
- Next → Amarna Tomb 2

Amarna Tomb 1 is a sepulchre near Amarna, Upper Egypt. It is the tomb of the ancient Egyptian noble Huya, which is located in the cluster of tombs known collectively as the Northern tombs. Amarna Tomb 1 is important because its tomb scenes "are of particular historical importance. Two unusual themes occur. One concerns the presence at el-Amarna of Queen Tiye, Akhenaten’s mother" while another scene "records a public reception of foreign tribute" (the so-called 'Royal Durbar of Year 12) of Akhenaten, of which another version appears in the adjacent tomb Amarna Tomb 2 (of Meryre II)." The other version survives in the tomb of Meryre II and is accompanied by a text--(Year 12, Month 6, Day 8).

== Huya ==
Huya was the treasurer and steward in the house of the King's Chief Wife, Tiye and the overseer of the royal quarters of the Great King's Wife Tiye. He held further titles including that of favorite of the Lord of the Two Lands.

Huya is also appointed as standard-bearer of the troop of young fighters called 'Aten Appears for him'. In other scenes, he is shown overseeing the craftsmen and others who serve under him. Mentioned in the tomb are the scribe of the House of Charm, Nakhtiu and the Overseer of the sculptors of the king's chief wife Tiye, named Iuti-Iuti.

Huya also mentions his wife Wenher, and his mother Tuy. In other scenes there is mention of two possible sisters of Huya, by the name of Nebet and Kherpu(t).

== Decoration ==
The tomb includes several scenes:

=== South wall ===
The south wall includes two scenes depicting Tiye sitting at meal with Akhenaten and Nefertiti; Akhenaten and Nefertiti are seated on the left. Akhenaten seems to wear a khat headdress and Nefertiti a short Nubian style wig. Next to Nefertiti seated on small chairs are Meritaten and one of her sisters - possibly Neferneferuaten Tasherit. Queen Tiye is shown opposite the King and Queen. She is seated and wears the double plumed headdress with the horned sundisk. She is accompanied by her daughter Baketaten, who is seated next to her on a small chair.

In another scene Tiye is now seated on the left. She wears a tripartite wig, topped with a modius and the double plumes with the horned sun-disk. Baketaten is shown standing next to Tiye. On the right Akhenaten and Nefertiti are seated and shown drinking from cups. Ankhesenpaaten is shown standing on the footstool in front of Nefertiti, while another princess (Meketaten?) stands next to Nefertiti and looks as though she's helping herself to some fruit. Nefertiti is called: "The heiress, great of favor, lady of grace, charming in loving-kindness, mistress of South and North, the Great wife of the King whom he loves, the Lady of the Two Lands, Nefertiti, living for ever and ever."

=== East wall ===
On the east wall Akhenaten is shown leading his mother Tiye to a temple. They are accompanied by the princess Baketaten as they enter the temple. Nefertiti and her daughters are not shown in this scene.

=== West wall ===
The west wall depicts Akhenaten and Nefertiti on the State Palanquin and the year 12 Durbar scene. Akhenaten and Nefertiti are shown being carried on a sedan chair. Akhenaten appears to be wearing the red crown of the north and holding a crook and flail(?). The royal daughters Meritaten and Meketaten are shown walking behind the sedan chair. They are attended by two nurses and six female attendants.

=== North wall ===
On the north wall Huya is shown in an award scene. He appears before Akhenaten and Nefertiti to receive his reward. Two princesses are shown in the palace. The princesses are identified as Meritaten and Meketaten.

The lintel on the north wall shows a depiction of the two royal families. On the left hand side Akhenaten and Nefertiti are shown seated. Nefertiti turns toward Akhenaten. Before them four royal daughters are shown: Meritaten, Meketaten, Ankhesenpaaten and Neferneferuaten Tasherit. All four girls are holding plume shaped wands. On the right side Amenhotep III is shown seated opposite Queen Tiye who is accompanied by the princess Baketaten. Three female attendants are shown behind Tiye.

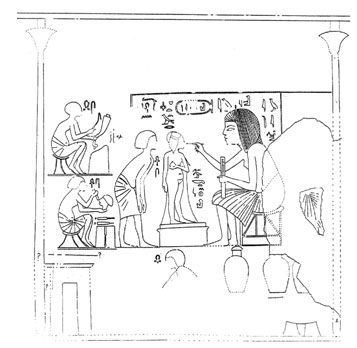
The sculptor Iuti-Iuti working on a statue of Beketaten

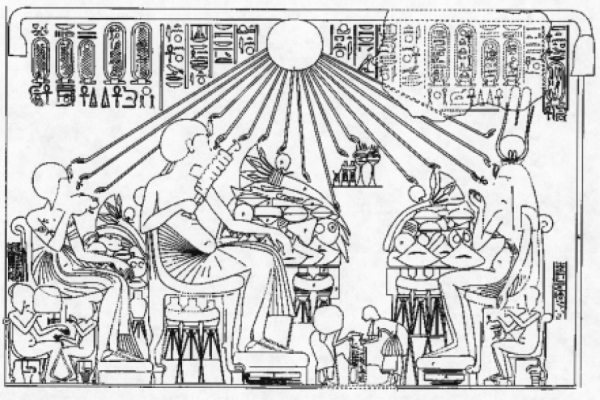
Banquet scene of the royal family

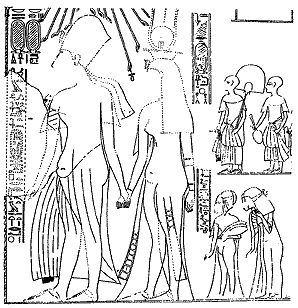
Akhenaten leading Tiye to the temple

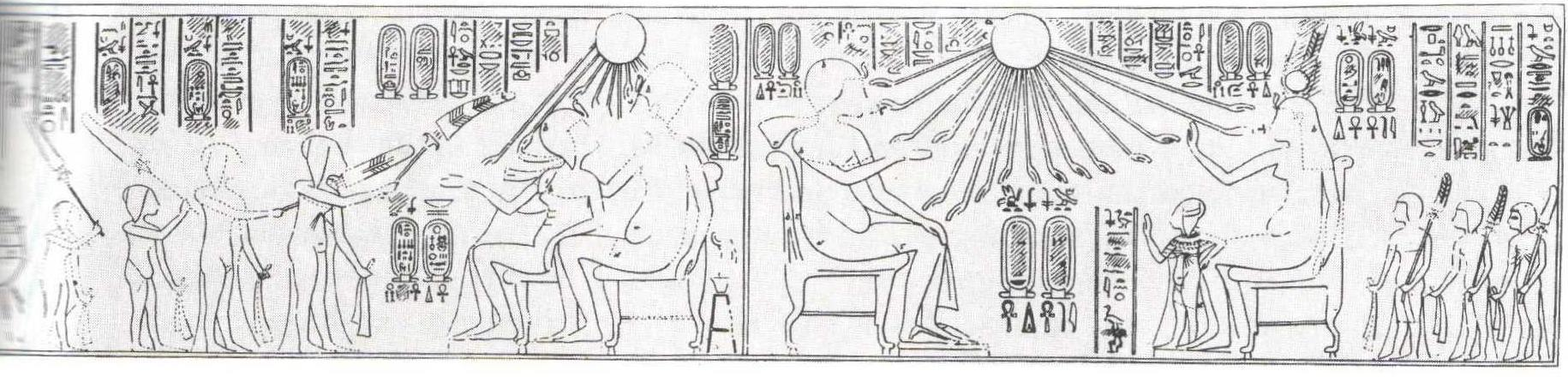
The two royal families as shown on the lintel
