= The Younger Lady =

Ancient Egyptian mummy found in tomb KV35

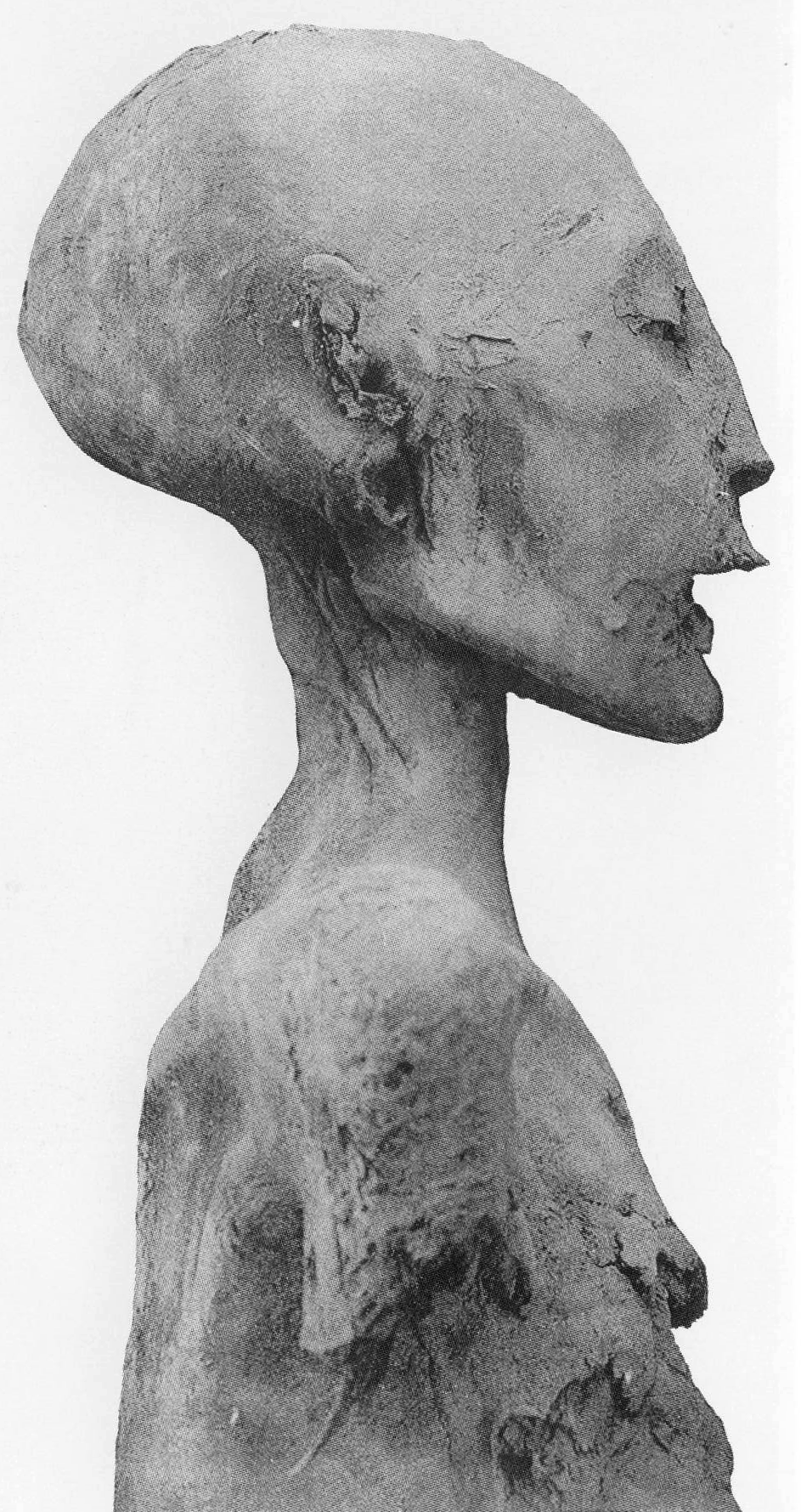
- Right profile view of the mummy
- Born: c. 1365 BC
- Died: c. 1335 BC (aged c. 30)
- Resting place: Egyptian Museum, Cairo, Egypt
- Spouse: Mummified man from KV55
- Children: Tutankhaten

The Younger Lady (c. 1365 BC - c. 1335 BC) is the informal name given to an ancient Egyptian mummy discovered within tomb KV35 in the Valley of the Kings by archaeologist Victor Loret in 1898. The mummy also has been given the designation KV35YL ("YL" for "Younger Lady") and 61072, and currently resides in the Egyptian Museum in Cairo. Through DNA tests, this mummy was identified as the mother of the pharaoh Tutankhaten and possibly a daughter of pharaoh Amenhotep III and his Great Royal Wife Tiye. Early speculation that this mummy was the remains of Nefertiti was argued to be incorrect, as nowhere is Nefertiti accorded the title "King's daughter" unless this mummy was in fact a cousin of Amenhotep IV and not a sister. Two Egyptologists, Zahi Hawass and Martin Bommas have suggested that she was Beketaten, the youngest daughter of Queen Tiye and Amenhotep III and the mother of Tutankhaten.

Other researchers voiced their skepticism towards this identification due to DNA degradation and the fact that inbreeding in the late 18th dynasty might have made some readings inconclusive, and proposed that the Younger Lady might have been one of Amenhotep III's and Tiye's granddaughters, rather than their daughter.

== Discovery ==
The mummy was found adjacent to two other mummies in KV35: a young boy who died at the approximate age of 10 and is thought to be Webensenu, and an older woman, who has been identified as Tiye by the recent DNA studies on Tutankhaten's lineage. The three mummies were found together in a small antechamber of the tomb of Amenhotep II, lying naked, side-by-side, and unidentified. All three mummies had been extensively damaged by ancient tomb robbers.

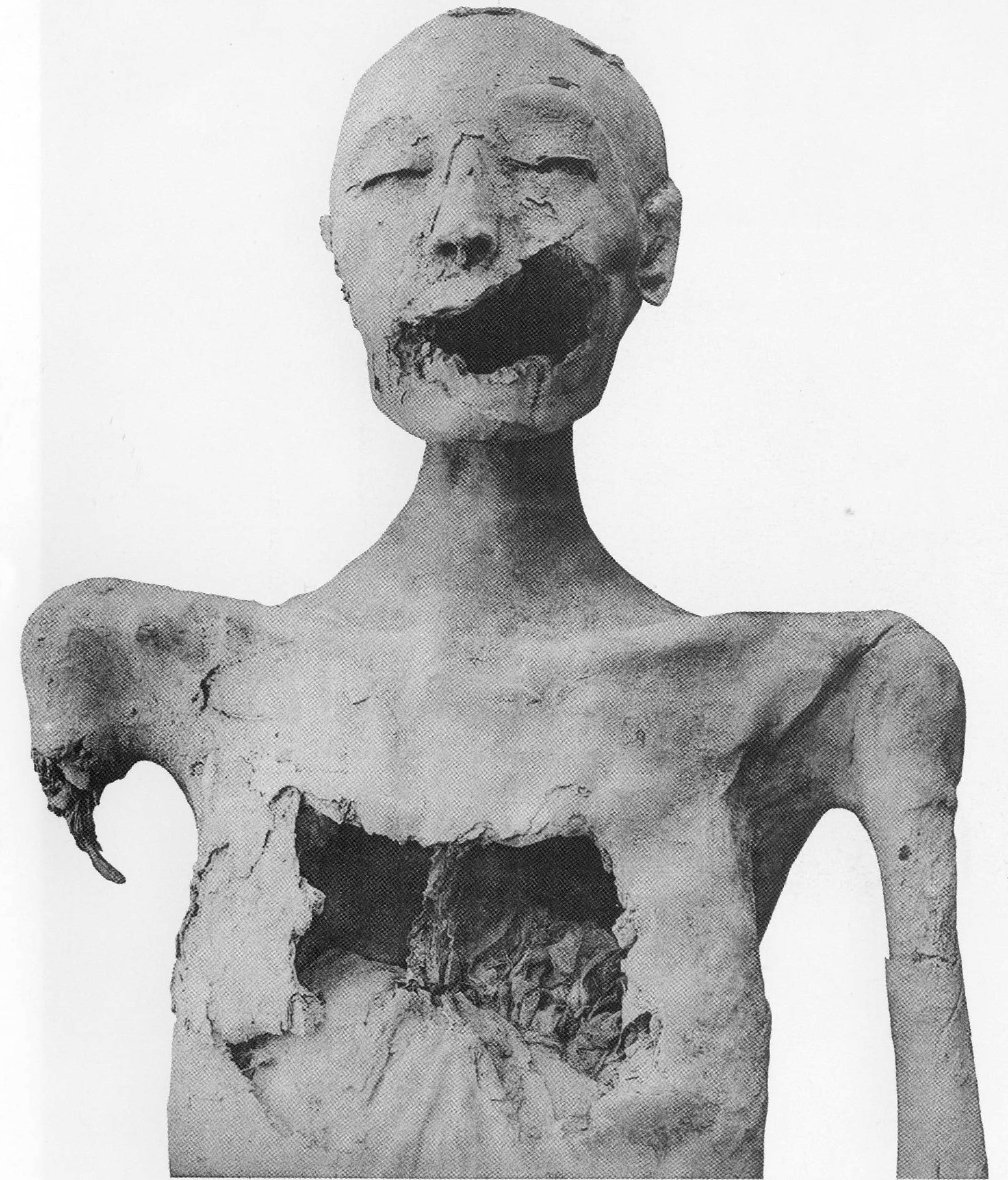
The front view of the Younger Lady

== Description of the mummy ==
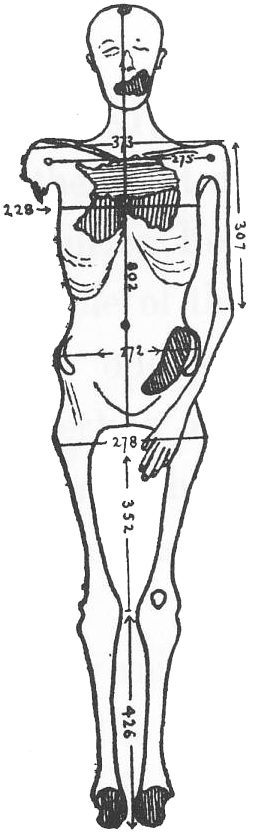
A 1912 sketch made by Grafton Smith of the full body of the Younger Lady mummy, documenting the extensive damage

Grafton Smith examined the mummy in his survey of the ancient royal mummies conducted at the beginning of the 20th century. He immediately noted that the body was that of a woman, not a man as thought by Loret and later authors; this mistake he ascribed to the fact the mummy's head was shaved. The body was measured to be 1.58 m (5 ft 2 in) tall and he judged her to have been no older than 25 years at the time of death based on the degree of fusion of the iliac crest and her non-erupted wisdom teeth. CT scanning suggested an age of 25 to 35 years at death based on the condition of the epiphyseal union and the closure of the cranial sutures.

There is a small (3.8 by 3 centimetres (1.5 in × 1.2 in) oval-shaped hole in the front of the skull; this hole has sharp, beveled, and festooned edges. Additionally, bone fragments are seen inside the skull. This, together with lack of evidence for attempted healing or sclerosis indicate this is a postmortem injury. The skull cavity contains her shrunken and desiccated brain and dura mater; there is no evidence of embalming material within the cranial cavity. This is unusual, as all other late Eighteenth Dynasty mummies show some attempt to remove the brain. Linen packs were placed in front of the eyes, and subcutaneous packing is present in her right cheek and mid-face.

The Younger Lady has a gaping wound in the left side of her mouth and cheek. It was thought that this wound, which also destroyed part of the jaw, had been the result of the actions of tomb robbers, but examinations of the mummy in 2003 by a scientific team from the University of York under Joann Fletcher, and CT scanning as part of The Egyptian Mummy Project determined that the wound had happened prior to death. The injury involves her cheek, left maxillary sinus, alveolar process, and part of her jaw; it shows no evidence of healing. Furthermore, pieces of most of the woman's fractured facial bones are missing; a rolled embalming pack of resin-impregnated linen was placed on top of the wound and partly beneath the remaining skin, which lends further support to the idea that the injury took place prior to mummification. The researchers consider this injury to have been fatal, and the result of a heavy object striking the woman's face. Hawass considers the injury to be accidental, involving the woman receiving a strong kick from an animal, such as a horse, while Hermann Schögl suggested that she was killed in a chariot crash or accident. Ashraf Selim viewed the wound as too violent to be the result of an accident. In his opinion, the Lady had been injured in an act of deliberate violence. Julian Heath suggests that the wound was likely the result of an axe blow.

The woman has several missing teeth due to her facial injury, one of which is seen inside her mouth. The upper wisdom teeth are non-erupted; her teeth have no visible attrition, and no occlusal irregularities.

The front wall of the chest sustained major damage at the hands of ancient tomb robbers, creating a large hole. Her heart was left in place, and remains visible within the body. The diaphragm was not removed but had two holes made to allow removal of the lungs. Her internal organs were removed through an embalming incision measuring 5.6 by 13.5 centimetres (2.2 in × 5.3 in), located in the left inguinal region; the incision is oval-shaped and gaping. The torso was packed with both linen fibers smeared with resin, and linen packs treated with resin. One of the resin-treated linen packs was placed within the pelvis. The pelvic floor was noted to be widely open and smeared with resin. It was possibly used as a route to remove the viscera during the mummification process and is a possible example of perineal evisceration. There is a subcutaneous filling at the back of the right hip. The pelvis contains small postmortem fractures, and the legs have also been damaged; the front half of both feet are missing.

Don Brothwell states that there is another wound below her left breast, likely a puncture or stab wound. However, this claim is not supported by any photos.

The left arm of the mummy extends beside her body, with the hand placed over the left hip; the right arm has been snapped off close to the shoulder, presumably by ancient tomb robbers. This break has gaping ends, with no evidence of attempted healing. The missing right arm of the mummy was the cause of a minor controversy among researchers. Two severed arms were located within KV35, and either one was thought likely to belong to the Younger Lady. One was a bent arm with a clenched fist, while the other was a straight arm. It was typical for the mummies of royal Egyptian women to be positioned with one of their arms bent and the other one in a straight position. The arm more likely to be bent was the left. Ashraf Selim of The Egyptian Mummy Project examined both arms to resolve the controversy. The bent arm was compared to the mummy's attached left hand, and was found to be too long to belong to the same woman; the bones of the two arms also were found "different in consistency". The straight arm was found to be of similar length and similar bone density, so the project concluded that the straight arm most likely belonged to the Younger Lady. The newly identified right arm of the Younger Lady has two breaks, "one in the upper arm and one at the wrist"; the hand has been broken off.

The Younger Lady has a double-pierced left earlobe; the right earlobe is damaged. Pierced ears were rather common for women of the New Kingdom of Egypt, including royals and non-royal women, so her pierced ear cannot help researchers determine her identity or social position. Similarly inconclusive for identification purposes was the discovery of a wig in KV35, which could have belonged to the Younger Lady. Supporters of the theory identifying the woman with Nefertiti, pointed to the wig's perceived similarities with the type of wigs used by Nefertiti. Although they are fashion items used by Egyptian women of the same era, they can not help identify the wig's user either.

== Identity ==
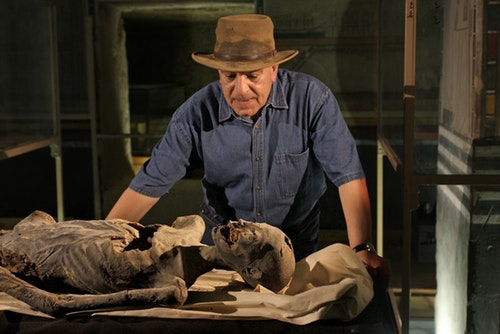
Zahi Hawass examining the mummy in 2018

There has been much speculation as to the identity of the Younger Lady. Upon discovery, Victor Loret believed the body to be that of a young man. A closer inspection by Smith confirmed that the mummy was that of a woman. Smith presumed she was a member of the royal family but considered her to be contemporary with Amenhotep II.

In 1999, independent researcher Marianne Luban proposed in a web article that the Younger Lady was the body of Nefertiti. This claim was repeated in 2003 by Fletcher. DNA tests have shown that this woman was the mother of Tutankhaten. The results also revealed she was a full-sister to her husband, the KV55 mummy, and that they were both the children of Amenhotep III and Tiye. This family relationship would lessen the possibility that the Younger Lady was either Nefertiti, or Amenhotep IV's secondary wife Kiya, because no known artifact accords titles to either of them as "King's sister" or "King's Daughter". The possibility of the Younger Lady being Sitamun, Iset, or Henuttaneb is considered unlikely, as they were Great Royal Wives of their father, Amenhotep III, and had Amenhotep IV married any of them, as Great Royal Wives, they would have become the principal queen of Egypt, rather than Nefertiti. The report concludes that the mummy is likely to be Nebetah or Beketaten, daughters of Amenhotep III and not known to have married their father, although he is known to have had four daughters with Tiye.

There still are some Egyptologists who support the theory that the Younger Lady is Nefertiti or Kiya, but Nefertiti was not Amenhotep IV's sister. Proponents of the genetic identification interpret the DNA results as being the result of three generations of first cousin marriage rather than a single, full-sibling marriage. No son is recorded for Nefertiti.

Identification of the Younger Lady as sister to Amenhotep IV raised some skepticism, as none of his sisters are known to have prominent position on his court in Amarna. Joyce Tyldesley speculates that her and KV 55 mummy might indeed be full-siblings and descendants of Amenhotep III and Tiye, but not as their children, but as grandchildren: Queen Meritaten and Pharaoh Smenkhkare (the latter being in this reconstruction a son of Amenhotep IV and Nefertiti). Kara Cooney considers unlikely both Nefertiti being Tutankhamun's mother and the Younger Lady being Amenhotep IV's sister, and she instead proposes that Amenhotep IV fathered his son by one of his daughters, Meritaten or Meketaten, "making him [Tutankhamun] a product of father-daughter incest and thus fitting the [inbreeding] DNA evidence of his body".

On other hand, Juan Antonio Belmonte points that while from genetical point of view identification Younger Lady as Meritaten is possible, it appears not very likely:

While it is true that genetically speaking Lady KV35YL may be a daughter of Akhenaten and Nefertiti, this will oblige that she would have inherited all paternal alleles of each of the haplotypes only from her grandfather Amenhotep III and none from her grandmother Tiyi; a possibility of one vs. eight. It should be added that Nefertiti should have passed to her daughter all her alleles inherited from Yuya and Tuya, which would confirm her as their granddaughter, but none of her other genetic pole. This seems again unlikely. In fact, when most of the variables are taken into account, the probability that both things happen at the same time is smaller than 6%, which does not invalidate the hypothesis but makes it very improbable.
Therefore, it is still better to assume that Lady KV35YL is a young daughter of Amenhotep III and Tiyi (...).

Assuming the identification the Younger Lady as a daughter of a pharaoh (Amenhotep III), a full sister and probable wife to a second pharaoh (Amenhotep IV), and the mother of a third pharaoh (Tutankhamun/Tutankhaten), she does not appear to have been a prominent figure in her lifetime. As of the 2020s, no inscription, relief, or statue dedicated to this young pharaoh's mother has been found. KV62, the tomb of Tutankhamun, contains mementos from his life and reign; none of these items ever mention his mother. This is in stark contrast to the influential mothers of the pharaohs of the Eighteenth Dynasty, who had a large presence in the reigns of their sons. Tiaa served as king's mother to Thutmose IV, Mutemwiya as king's mother to Amenhotep III, and Tiye as king's mother to Amenhotep IV. It seems likely that Tutankhamun/Tutankhaten never had a king's mother (mwt nswt) during his reign, indicating that she had died before his rise to the throne. This lends credence to the Younger Lady being a minor wife of Amenhotep IV who died before Tutankhamun became king. Willeke Wendrich also considers it likely that she was a minor wife or a concubine to Amenhotep IV. Wendrich notes that the pharaohs of Egypt typically had multiple wives. This often resulted in multiple sons serving as viable heirs to the throne, and creating the potential competition among the sons to gain the right to succeed their father.

Belmonte argues that man buried in KV 55 should be identified as Smenkhkare, who was both son of Amenhotep III and Tiye, and brother-husband to Younger Lady. He believes such scenario would perfectly explain the lack of informations about Younger Lady despite her being consort of the Pharaoh, as she could remain overshadowed by his chief queen Meritaten, or even die before his ascension to the throne.

== Facial reconstruction ==
On 7 February 2018, The Younger Lady was featured on the seventh episode of the fifth season of Expedition Unknown, entitled "Great Women of Ancient Egypt". On the presumption that the mummy might be Nefertiti, a team led by Expedition Unknown's host Josh Gates used the preserved remains, modern technology, and artistry to present a reconstruction of what the Younger Lady would have looked like in full royal regalia. The bust was created by French paleoartist Elisabeth Daynes.

== See also ==
- List of unsolved deaths
