= Kiya =

- Queen consort of Egypt; Great Beloved Wife
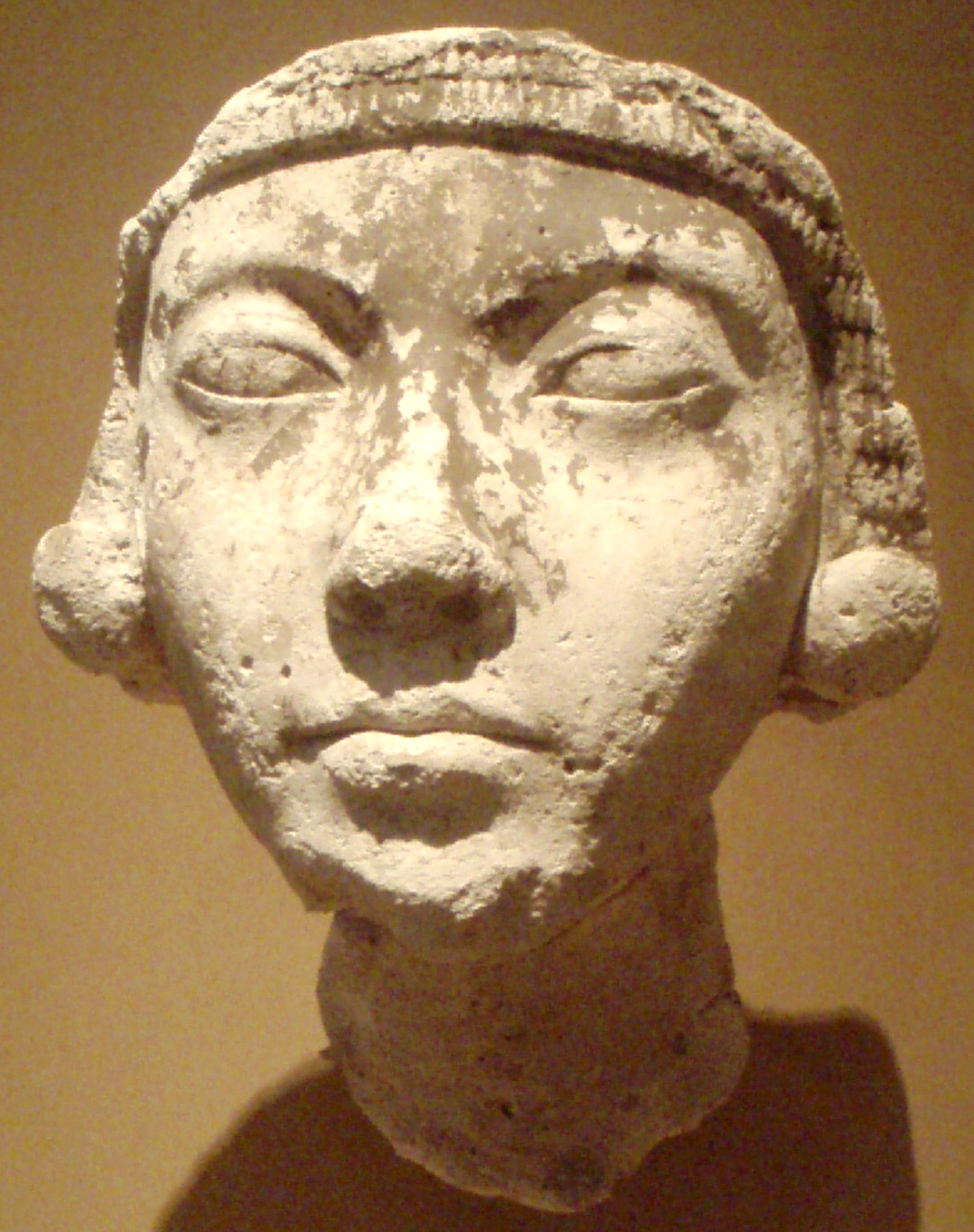
- A plaster study of a young woman wearing large earrings, generally identified as Kiya, currently on display at the Metropolitan Museum of Art, New York City
- Spouse: Pharaoh Akhenaten
- Issue: A daughter
Egyptian name
Two variations:
V31 Z4 i A B1
k i Z4 A B7
- Dynasty: 18th of Egypt

Kiya was one of the wives of the Egyptian Pharaoh Akhenaten. Little is known about her, and her actions and roles are poorly documented in the historical record, in contrast to those of Akhenaten's 'Great royal wife', Nefertiti. Her unusual name suggests that she may originally have been a Mitanni princess. Surviving evidence demonstrates that Kiya was an important figure at Akhenaten's court during the middle years of his reign, when she had a daughter with him. She disappears from history a few years before her royal husband's death. In previous years, she was thought to be mother of Tutankhamun, but recent DNA evidence suggests this is unlikely.

== Name and titles ==
The name Kiya itself is cause for debate. It has been suggested that it is a "pet" form, rather than a full name, and as such could be a contraction of a foreign name, such as the Mitanni name "Tadukhipa," referring to the daughter of King Tushratta. Tadukhipa married Amenhotep III at the very end of his reign, and the Amarna Letters indicate that she was of marriageable age at that time. In particular, Amarna Letters 27 through 29 confirm that Tadukhipa became one of Akhenaten's wives. Thus some Egyptologists have proposed that Tadukhipa and Kiya might be the same person.

However, there is no confirming evidence that Kiya was anything but a native Egyptian. In fact, Cyril Aldred proposed that her unusual name is actually a variant of the Ancient Egyptian word for "monkey," making it unnecessary to assume a foreign origin for her.

In inscriptions, Kiya is given the titles of "The Favorite" and "The Greatly Beloved," but never of "Nobelwoman (iryt-p‘t)" or "Great Royal Wife", some believe this indicates that she was not of royal Egyptian blood, but in fact the two are not causally related. Many queens of royal descent have not been shown to bear these titles, such as Mutnofret, the Younger Lady, and Tanedjemet. Her full titles read, "The wife and greatly beloved of the King of Upper and Lower Egypt, who lives on Maat, Neferkheperure-waenre, the beautiful child of the living Aten, who shall live forever continually, Kiya." All artifacts relating to Kiya derive from Amarna, Akhenaten's short-lived capital city, or from Tomb KV55 in the Valley of the Kings. She is not attested during the reign of any other pharaoh.

Kiya is most often referred to as Akhenaten's greatly beloved wife and as The Noble Lady (tꜣ šps.t), and some scholars take this to mean that she did not hold the title Royal Wife and was not a true royal wife. However, although the title Royal Wife had a certain threshold—even princesses from other great powers were often content with this status—its conferral was not especially stringent: all three Syrian wives of Thutmose III held this title, and in the Tale of the Two Brothers, which was very likely modeled on Kiya, Bata's wife is once called the Royal Wife Tashepsut after marrying the king. In Kiya's case, the lengthy titulary custom-made for her represents her preeminent position among the many royal wives, second only to the Great Royal Wife Nefertiti; and in some relatively brief inscriptions she is also called Royal Wife.

== Life ==
Kiya's existence was unknown until 1959, when her name and titles were noted on a small cosmetic container in the collection of the Metropolitan Museum of Art. It had been bought almost thirty years previously, without provenance, from Egyptologist Howard Carter.

The British Egyptologists Aidan Dodson and Dyan Hilton wrote:

Kiya is named and depicted on various blocks originating at Amarna, on vases in London and New York, four fragmentary kohl-tubes in Berlin and London, and a wine-jar docket. She may also be depicted by three uninscribed sculptor's studies. Her coffin and canopic jars were taken over for the burial of a king (probably Smenkhkare), which was ultimately discovered in tomb KV55 in the Valley of the Kings. Almost all of Kiya's monuments were usurped for daughters of Akhenaten, making it fairly certain that she was disgraced some time after Year 11 [of Akhenaten].

Akhenaten and his family were based in Thebes for the first four years of his reign, establishing the new capital city at Amarna in Year 5. Kiya is not attested during this early period. Only after the move to Amarna does she emerge through inscriptional evidence as one of Akhenaten's wives.

Kiya's name appeared prominently in the temple installation known as the Maru-Aten, at the southern edge of the city, according to epigraphic studies. The inscriptions in the Maru-Aten were eventually recarved to replace the name and titles of Kiya with those of Akhenaten's eldest daughter, Meritaten.

One or more "sunshades" or side-chapels in the city's largest temple to the Aten, the Per-Aten, also originally bore the name of Kiya. These sunshades were later reinscribed for Meritaten and Ankhesenpaaten, the third daughter of Akhenaten. Some of the recarved inscriptions indicate that Kiya had a daughter, whose name is not preserved. Marc Gabolde proposes that Kiya's daughter was Beketaten, who is more often identified as a daughter of Amenhotep III and Tiye.

The most spectacular of Kiya's monuments is a gilded wooden coffin of costly and intricate workmanship that was discovered in Tomb KV55 in the Valley of the Kings. The coffin's footboard contains an Atenist prayer that was originally intended for a woman, but was later revised to a refer to a man – with enough grammatical errors to betray the gender of the original speaker. The style of the coffin and the language of its surviving inscriptions place its manufacture in the reign of Akhenaten. Scholarly opinion now makes Kiya its original owner. The richness of this coffin, which is comparable in style to the middle coffin of Tutankhamun, provides further evidence of Kiya's exalted status at Amarna.

Many Egyptologists have tried to produce an explanation for her prominence. Numerous scholarly discussions of Tutankhamun's parentage during the late twentieth century, and the early years of the twenty-first, have mentioned the hypothesis that Kiya was Tutankhamun's mother. If she had indeed borne a male heir to Akhenaten, this distinction might well merit unique honors. However, genetic studies of the Egyptian royal mummies, led by Zahi Hawass and Carsten Pusch, have now established that Tutankhamun's biological mother was KV35YL, the "Younger Lady" discovered in the mummy cache in the tomb of Amenhotep II.

== Disgrace or death? ==
Kiya disappears from history during the last third of Akhenaten's reign. Her name and images were erased from monuments and replaced by those of Akhenaten's daughters. The exact year of her disappearance is unknown, with recent authorities suggesting dates that range from Year 11 or 12 to Year 16 of Akhenaten. One of the last datable instances of her name is a wine docket from Amarna that mentions Akhenaten's Year 11, indicating that Kiya's estate produced a vintage in that year. Whether she died, was exiled, or suffered some other misfortune, Egyptologists have often interpreted the erasure of her name as a sign of disgrace.

Various scenarios have been advanced to explain Kiya's disappearance. Having suggested that Kiya was the mother of Tutankhamun, Nicholas Reeves writes that "it is not beyond the realm of possibility that she fell from grace in a coup engineered by the jealous Nefertiti herself." Having argued that Kiya was Tadukhipa, daughter of the King of Mitanni, Marc Gabolde suggests that she "paid the price" for a deterioration in the alliance between Egypt and Mitanni and was sent back home.

There is evidence that Kiya was still alive in the seventeenth year of Akhenaten’s reign, the very year in which he died. Some scholars believe that she was defeated in a political struggle with Meritaten and was ultimately disgraced, along with her daughter.

It is uncertain whether Kiya ever used the rich funerary equipment that was prepared against her death. If her disappearance resulted from disgrace or exile, the answer would be no. On the other hand, if she died in good standing with Akhenaten, she probably would have received a lavish burial appropriate to her station. In the latter case, a likely site for her interment would be the Amarna Royal Tomb, which includes a suite of three chambers evidently used to house female members of Akhenaten's family. At least two and possibly as many as three different individuals were interred in this suite, including Akhenaten's daughter Meketaten, the only one whose name survives. Two of the chambers originally included painted plaster reliefs depicting Akhenaten, Nefertiti, certain of their daughters, and other mourners lamenting the deceased. Some Egyptologists have suggested that one of these scenes of mourning refers to Kiya, although no specific evidence supports this claim.

Further, the conventional interpretation of the mourning scenes is that they represent the death in childbirth of the deceased, although this view has recently been challenged. The conventional interpretation has encouraged speculation that Kiya died bearing Akhenaten a child, but again, no clear-cut evidence is available.

== KV35 "Younger Lady" mummy ==
Some have speculated that the mummy known as the Younger Lady, discovered in KV35, might be that of Kiya. According to Joann Fletcher (who controversially identified the mummy as Nefertiti) a Nubian-style wig was found near the mummy. This style was also associated with Kiya.

DNA test results published in February 2010 have shown conclusively that the Younger Lady mummy was the mother of Tutankhamun, and by extension a wife of Akhenaten. The results also show that she was a full sister to her husband, and that they were both the children of Amenhotep III and Queen Tiye. This family relationship rules out the possibility that the Younger Lady was Kiya, because no known artifact accords Kiya the title or attribute "King's daughter." For similar reasons Nefertiti is also ruled out. The report concludes that either Nebetah or Beketaten, younger daughters of Amenhotep III who are not known to have married their father, are the most likely candidates for the identity of the Younger Lady mummy.

On another hand, Joyce Tyldesley expressed doubt about veracity of genetic testing due to contamination and inbreeding in royal family that could potentially make ambiguous readings of genetic relationships between examined individuals. She views as improbable that such important lady as Akhenaten's sister would be omitted in sources from Amarna had she been mother of his heir, and ignoring genetic results, she still considers it is plausible that Tutankhamun was son of Kiya.

== Gallery of images ==
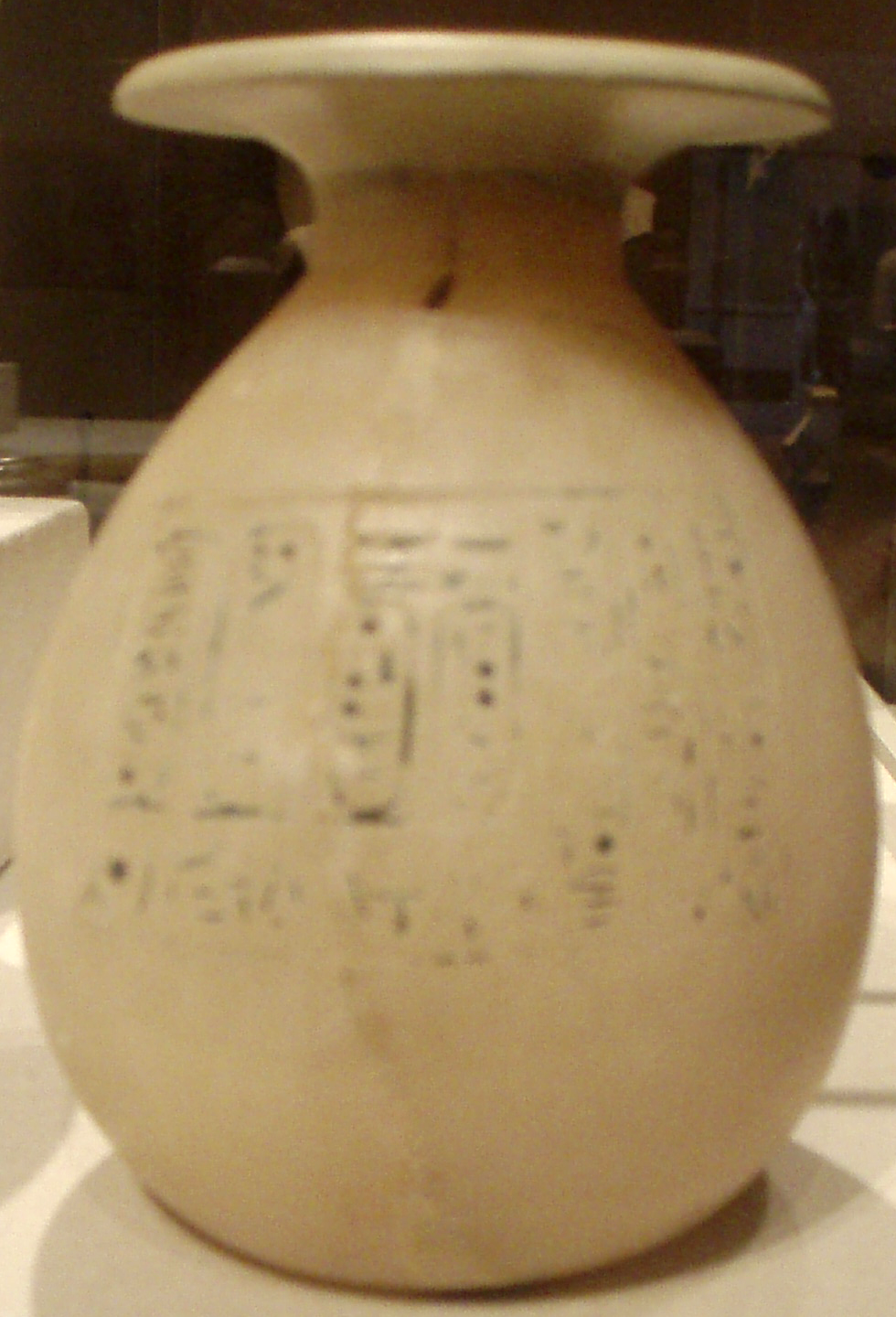
Unguent jar depicting the name of Kiya - on display at the Metropolitan Museum of Art

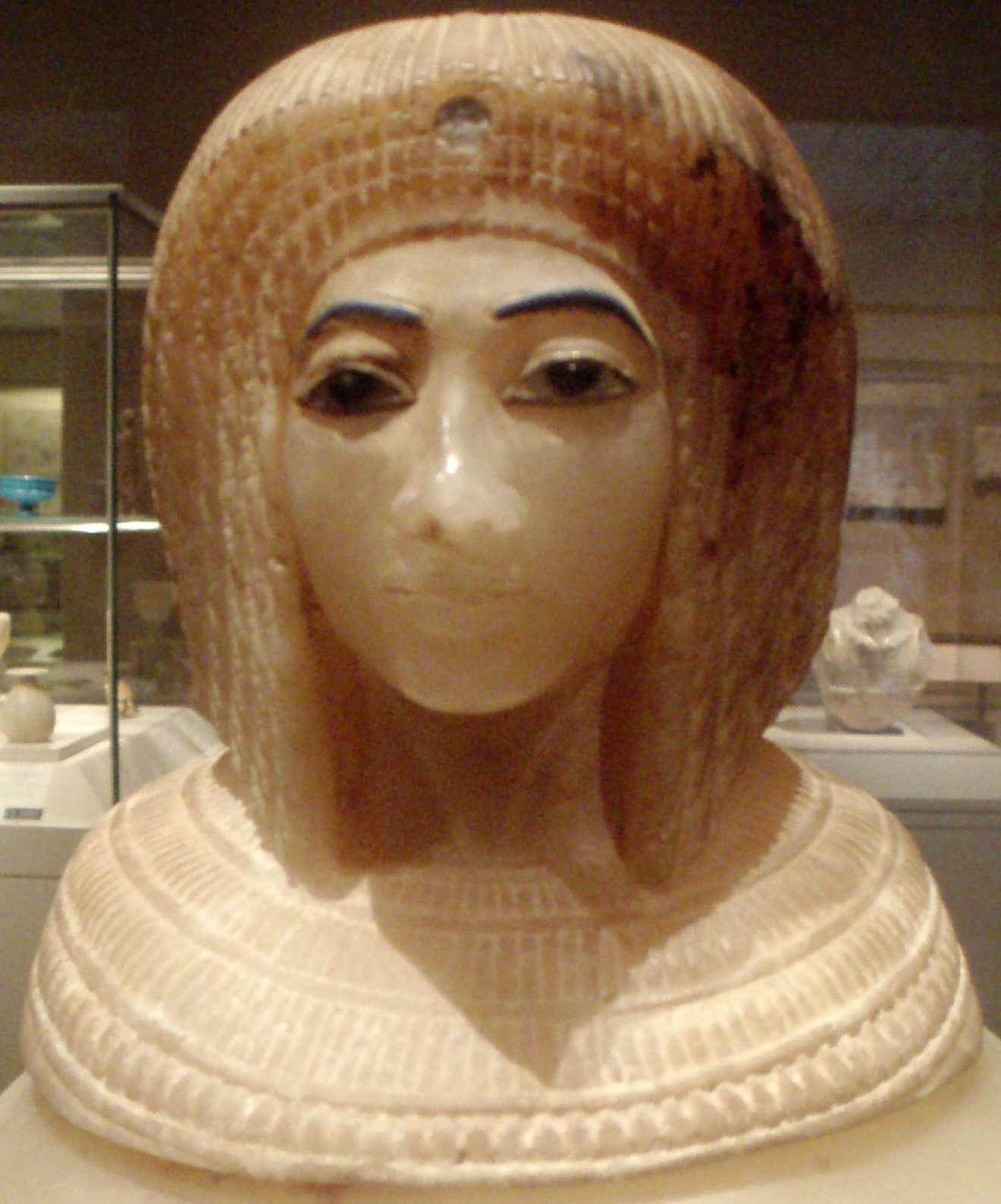
Close-up of an Egyptian alabaster canopic jar thought to depict a likeness of Kiya, from tomb KV55 - on display at the Metropolitan Museum of Art

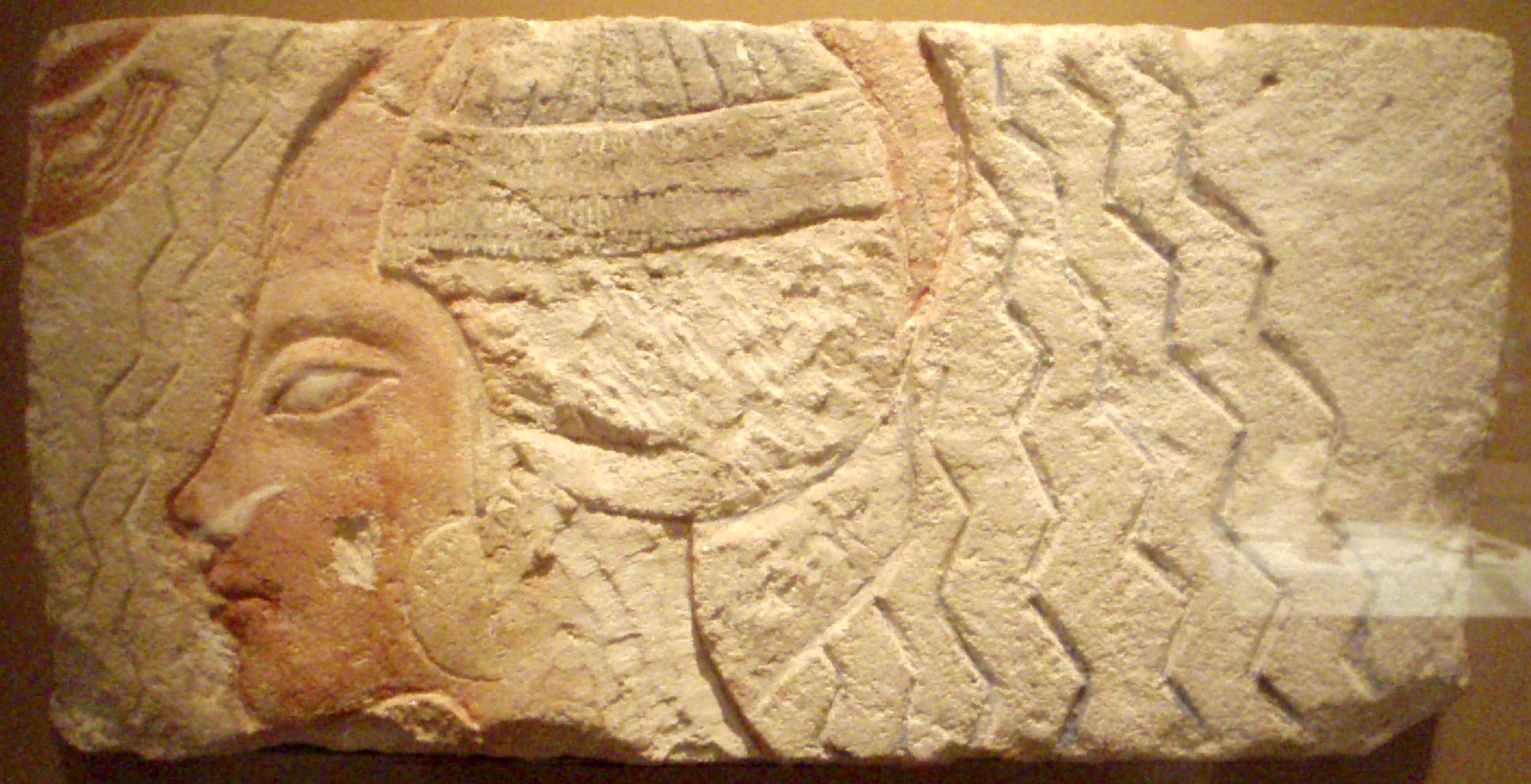
An Amarna relief depicting a woman undergoing a purification ritual, while the figure has been partially re-carved, the large earrings and style of wig are thought to be representative of Queen Kiya - on display at the Metropolitan Museum of Art
