= Martin Bommas =

German Egyptologist (born 1967)

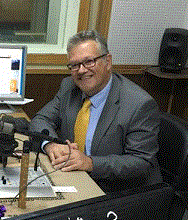
- Bommas at Radio Cairo
- Born: 1967 (age 58–59); Heilbronn

Academic background
- Education: Heidelberg University

Academic work
- Discipline: Egyptology and archaeology
- Sub-discipline: Old Kingdom; Middle Kingdom; New Kingdom
- Institutions: German Archaeological Institute; Leiden University; University of Basel; University of Birmingham; Macquarie University
- Doctoral students: Charlotte Booth

Martin Bommas (born 1967 in Heilbronn) is a German Egyptologist, archaeologist, and philologist. He was a professor and Museum Director at the Macquarie University History Museum in Sydney, Australia. He is the founding director of the Qubbet el-Hawa Research Project (QHRP) in Aswan, Egypt. He has published on ancient Egyptian mortuary liturgies, rituals and religious texts spanning the Old Kingdom to the Christian era. In archaeology, he has examined the Old and Middle Kingdom settlement remains and the 18th Dynasty temple of Khnum at Elephantine. At Qubbet el-Hawa, he discovered a necropolis inhabited by the local non-administrative elite dating to the late Old Kingdom and First Intermediate Period, excavating mostly unlooted tombs. He left Macquarie University in 2023.

== Academia ==
Martin Bommas studied Egyptology at the University of Heidelberg, completing his M.A. in 1994 and his PhD in 2000. During this period, he worked in the Egyptological Institute of Heidelberg as a research associate in the library (1988) and a tutor of undergraduate students in Egyptology (1991-1994) before becoming Lecturer in Egyptology (1994-2002). Following his time in Heidelberg, he was appointed assistant professor at the Egyptological Seminar at the University of Basel in 2001-2004 and Lecturer in Egyptology in 2004-2006. During this period, he also taught Egyptology at the University of Rome (2004), the University of Zurich (2005), and the University of Sheffield (2006). In 2006 he was appointed Senior Lecturer in Egyptology at the University of Birmingham where he taught extensively in the fields of Egyptology and archaeology, and in 2014 he was selected as Reader in Egyptology at the university. He remained in this position until 2018 when he accepted his position as Professor and Museum Director at the Macquarie University History Museum, part of the Museums and Collections of Macquarie University. He served as the editor-in-chief of the Journal of Egyptian Archaeology from 2014-2018. Since 2008 he has also been the editor-in-chief of the Cultural Memory and History in Antiquity series of Bloomsbury publishing. Since 2021, he has been the Editor-in-Chief of Studies in Egyptian Archaeological Science. Martin Bommas has (co-)published 23 books and 147 articles, including the first biography of Pharaoh Tutankhamun in 2024.

== Philology ==
In 1994, Martin Bommas began working on religious texts at the University of Leiden, studying the early New Kingdom Papyrus Leiden I 346 on ancient Egyptian epagomenal texts (published 1999). Between 1994 and 2008, together with Jan Assmann, he edited and published Ancient Egyptian Mortuary Liturgies. Based on a papyrus from the Middle Kingdom held in Moscow, he reconstructed the Ritual of Investiture carried out for both living and dead pharaohs, published in 2013. In 2020, he identified all four walls of the First Intermediate Period burial chamber of the governor Baqet II at Beni Hasan (the grandfather of Baqet III) as being inscribed with Pyramid Texts and Coffin Texts in the hieratic script which served the tomb owner as a ritual handbook, published in 2022. This discovery marks a breakthrough with regards to the transmission of Pyramid Texts after the downfall of the Old Kingdom.

== Archaeology ==
Martin Bommas began his archaeological work in Pakistan in 1990 where he participated in survey and excavation work in the Karakorum region in association with the Academy of Sciences, Heidelberg. He then joined the German Archaeological Institute's mission in Elephantine, Egypt in 1990 as a research associate before being made field director in 1991. Notably, this role was maintained during the Gulf Crisis. He continued to work at Elephantine until 2009 and during this period he contributed significantly to the reconstruction of the 18th Dynasty temple of Khnum, the restoration and reconstruction of the monumental gate of Amenhotep II and Ptolemy I which once stood in the southern temenos wall of the temple of Satet, and the discovery of a First Intermediate Period/Middle Kingdom settlement north of the Sanctuary of Heqaib. Since 2015 he has directed the “Qubbet el-Hawa Research Project” (QHRP) in Aswan, now a joint excavation between Macquarie University and the Egypt Exploration Society. Among the notable discoveries at the site was the causeway of Sarenput I, which led him to receive the Luxor Times Top 10 Discoveries award in 2017. In 2016 he also discovered the Lower Necropolis of Qubbet el-Hawa dating to the Old and Middle Kingdoms.

== Museums ==
In the museum sector, Martin Bommas has contributed to the establishment and maintenance of temporary and permanent exhibitions. He acted as a consulting Egyptologist for the establishment of the new Archaeological Museum at Elephantine in Egypt (1995-1998) and for an exhibition on Egypt in Graeco-Roman times at the Städtische Galerie Liebieghaus in Frankfurt (2003-2005), as well as a consulting archaeologist for a permanent exhibition on Egyptian gods in the Aegean world at the Archaeological Museum of Thessaloniki. Between 2010 and 2018 he served as curator of the Eton Myers Collection of Egyptian Art at the University of Birmingham. In 2018 he moved to Macquarie University in Sydney to occupy the role of museum director at the now closed Museum of Ancient Cultures (2018-2021) and the Macquarie University History Museum (2021-2023). This museum is part of the Arts Precinct (opened 2021) at the university and the collection comprises over 18,000 objects that span ancient cultures around the world to modern Australian history. In his role as museum director, Martin Bommas designed the museum’s layout, published two exhibition catalogues and designed three temporary exhibitions between 2021 and 2023.

== Non-archaeological discoveries ==
Some notable achievements in Martin Bommas’ career include the discovery of several papyrus fragments. In 1998, he published the long lost fragments of the magical Papyrus Harris 501 that he discovered in the Von-Portheim Stiftung, Heidelberg. Between 2016 and 2017, he was resident Getty Research Scholar at the Getty Villa in Los Angeles where he discovered a large collection of unpublished hieratic papyri, mainly stemming from the Book of the Dead. This material has been published in the Google Arts & Culture online exhibition: The Getty Book of the Dead. At the Nicholson Museum at the University of Sydney, he discovered, translated and researched more unpublished papyri fragments, including a papyrus dating to the earliest period of Islam in Egypt.

== Media ==
Martin Bommas has participated in various media productions, such as The Verb with Ian McMillan, Jenny Uglow, Julian Glover, Amy Cooke-Hodgson and Rachel Parris. In 2016, he was featured with Dr Eman Khalifa on Radio Cairo's World of Info. Presenting new discoveries made by the QHRP at Qubbet el-Hawa, both were featured in the UK national TV Channel 5 series "Egyptian Tomb Hunting with Tony Robinson", shown on 27–28 November 2018.
