= Eighteenth Dynasty of Egypt family tree =

Family tree of ancient Egyptian rulers

As with most ancient Egyptian royal dynasties, the family tree for the Eighteenth Dynasty is complex and unclear.

Senakhtenre Ahmose	Tetisheri
Seqenenre Tao	Ahhotep I
Ahhotep II	Kamose
Seventeenth dynasty
Ahmose-Sitkamose	Ahmose I	Ahmose-Nefertari
Ahmose-ankh	Ahmose Sapair	Ahmose-Meritamon	Amenhotep I	Senseneb
Ahmose	Thutmose I	Mutnofret
Hatshepsut	Thutmose II	Iset
Neferure
Hatshepsut-Meryetre	Thutmose III
Tiaa	Amenhotep II
Mutemwiya	Thutmose IV	Yuya	Tjuyu
Amenhotep III	Tiye	Anen
Kheperkheprure Ay	Tey
Sitamun?	Henuttaneb	Nebetah
Thutmose	Aset	Beketaten
"The Younger Lady"	Akhenaten	Nefertiti ( Neferneferuaten?)	Mutbenret (Mutnedjmet?)	Horemheb	Amenia
Smenkhkare	Tutankhamun	Meketaten	Neferneferuaten Tasherit	Neferneferure	Setepenre
Meritaten ( Neferneferuaten?)	Ankhesenamun
Meritaten Tasherit	Ankhesenpaaten Tasherit	2 daughters
