= Colossal statue of Amenhotep III and Tiye =

Group statue of Egyptian 18th-Dynasty pharaoh Amenhotep III and Queen Tiye

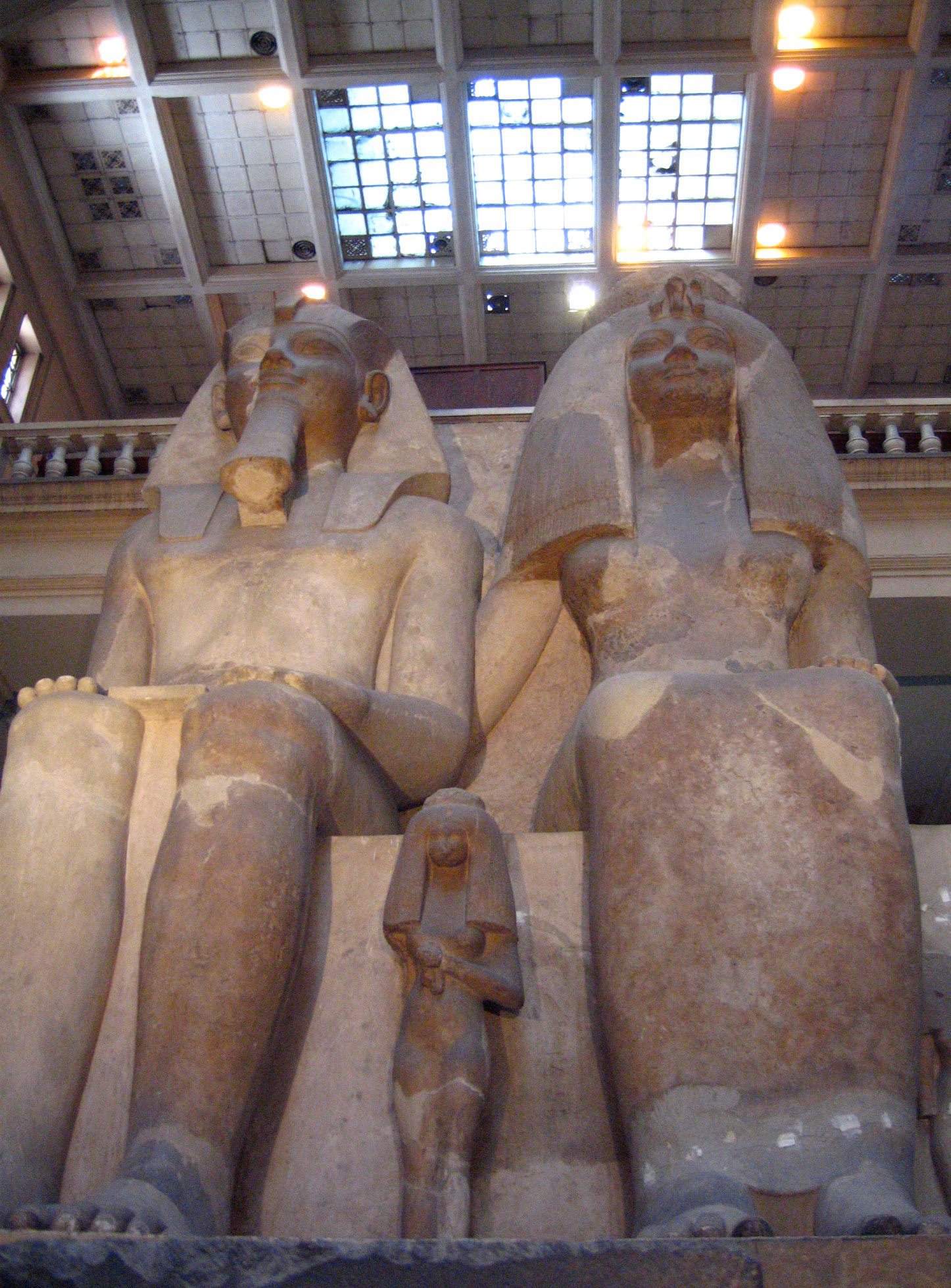
- The statue in the hall of the Egyptian Museum
- Year: c. 1360 BCE
- Medium: limestone
- Subject: Amenhotep III; Tiye; Henuttaneb; Nebetah unknown princess
- Dimensions: 7 m (height) cm × 4,4 m (width) cm (23 ft in × 14,4 ft in)
- Location: Egyptian Museum, Cairo

The colossal statue of Amenhotep III and Tiye is a monolith group statue of Egyptian pharaoh Amenhotep III of the eighteenth dynasty, his Great Royal Wife Tiye, and their daughter Princess Henuttaneb, mostly intact, along with two other daughters, partially destroyed and not visible in this image. It is the largest known dyad ever carved. The statue originally stood in Medinet Habu, Western Thebes; today it is the centerpiece of the main hall of the Egyptian Museum in Cairo.

== Description ==
The statue is made of limestone, its width is 4,4 m, its height is 7 m. The almond shaped eyes and curved eyebrows of the figures are of typical late 18th dynasty style. Amenhotep III wears the nemes headdress with uraeus, a false beard and a kilt; he is resting his hands on his knees. Queen Tiye is sitting on his left, her right arm is placed around her husband's waist. Her height is equal to that of the pharaoh, which shows her prominent status. She wears an ankle-length, close-fitting dress and a heavy wig with a vulture headdress, modius and double uraei. The cobras and the vulture are crowned, the proper right cobra wears the white crown of Upper Egypt, while the proper left one wears the red crown of Lower Egypt.

The three smaller figures depict three of their daughters. Princess Henuttaneb, standing between her parents, is depicted as a grown woman, in a close-fitting dress and a full wig with modius and plumes but without uraei (this is the only difference between her mother's headdress and hers). Next to Amenhotep stands the damaged figure of a younger daughter, Nebetah, while next to Tiye stands the even more damaged figure of another princess, whose name has been lost. The dyad is one of only two known statues depicting Henuttaneb, and the only one of Nebetah.

The statue is likely to have been carved around the first sed festival of Amenhotep III. Arielle P. Kozloff writes that the age of the daughters depicted on the monument, especially that of Henuttaneb, and the style of Queen Tiye's wig, which was "at its most developed, nearly shrouding her face" suggests that the statue was made during the third decade of the king's reign. It is possible that it was made from the good quality limestone which was removed to create the open courtyard of TT192 – a huge tomb belonging to Queen Tiye's steward Kheruef, work on which was started around this time.

The eldest daughter of the royal couple, Sitamun is absent from the statue group, probably because she was elevated to the rank of great royal wife by Year 30 of Amenhotep's reign. Henuttaneb was the second or third daughter, born either before or after Iset, who became queen in Year 34. Henuttaneb is nowhere mentioned as a queen, but on this colossus she is described as "the companion of Horus, who is in his heart". This is the only instance of this queenly title being given to a princess, and her name is sometimes written in a cartouche, which may indicate that she was elevated to queen like Sitamun and Iset. The third princess on the statue, whose name is destroyed is sometimes tentatively identified as Iset, but Amenhotep may have had as many as sixteen daughters, not all of whom are known.

== History ==
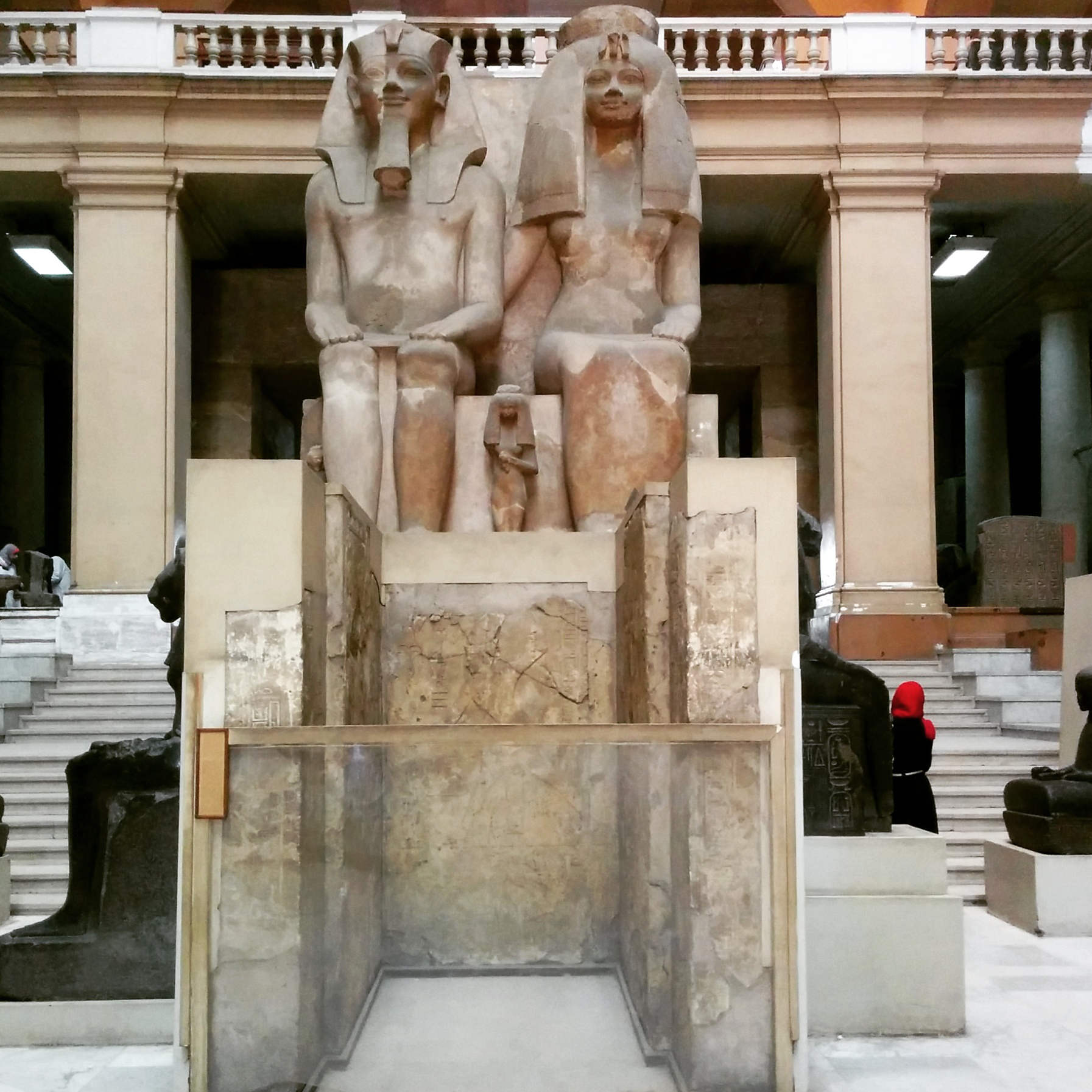
View of the statue from afar, in the museum

The statue belonged to the mortuary temple of Amenhotep III, which has been mostly destroyed since, but during its time was the largest temple complex in Thebes, surpassing even the Karnak temple. As it was built too close to the floodplain, less than two hundred years later it already stood in ruins and most of its stones were reused by later pharaohs for their own building projects. The place where the statue was found is likely to have been the south gate of the mortuary temple complex, as it is as far from the temple as the Colossi of Memnon at the east gate. Another possibility is that the dyad was usurped by Ramesses III when using the blocks from Amenhotep's temple to construct his own at Medinet Habu, although original names were not erased. The statue was found in the late 19th century in fragments. In 1897 the fragments were moved by Georges Daressy to the forecourt of the small Amun temple at Medinet Habu nearby; later they were moved to Cairo and reassembled for the opening of the Egyptian Museum in 1902. The colossus has the catalogue number M610; the figure of Princess Henuttaneb has a separate number, JE 33906.

A 27,6 cm limestone head, found in a private collection, turned out to be the head of Princess Nebetah and a part of this statue. Nebetah wears a round wig and a modius headdress; traces of the sidelock of youth can still be discovered. She has the same almond-shaped eyes with finely carved eyebrows and cosmetic lines as the other figures of the group. The head is likely to have been intentionally removed from the statue group, probably in the medieval period, exposed on the ground for quite a long time – as it is in a worse condition than the rest of the statue –, and was found before 1897 when the rest of the statue was moved from its place. It belonged to a French private collection in the early 20th century, was exhibited as part of the W. Arnold Meijer Collection in Amsterdam in 2005-2006 and was sold for US$206,500 in 2008. An exact copy of the head was attached to the statue in Cairo.

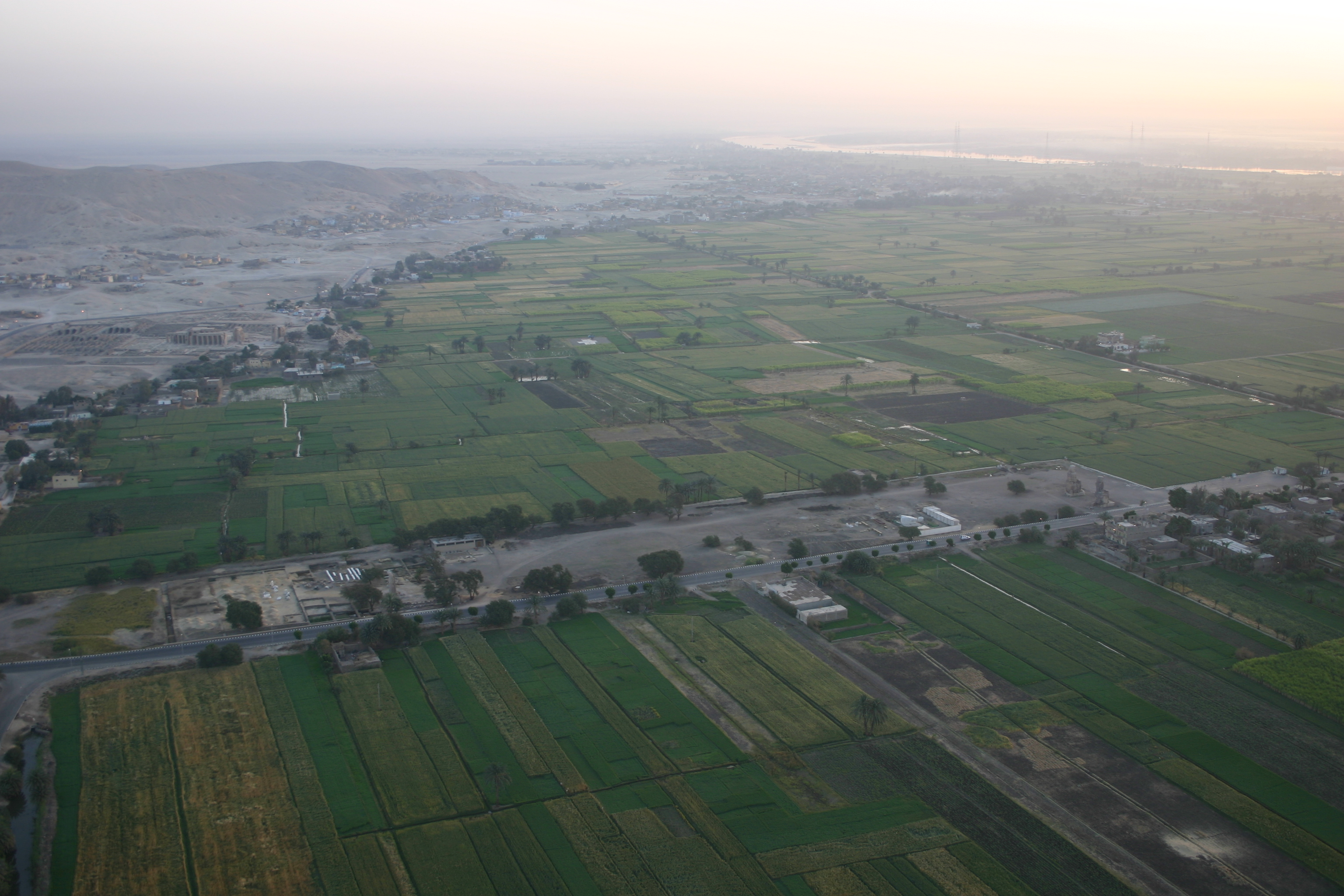
Original site where Amenhotep III's mortuary temple once stood

In 2011, several new fragments of the statue were found during a rescue excavation before installation of a new sewage system on the west bank of Luxor. These could be reconstructed to form six missing parts of the statue, including part of headdress, chest and right leg of the king, part of wig, left arm, palm, fingers and leg of the queen, and part of the statue base, with a Nubian prisoner. Due to the fragments not having any inscriptions on them, they were initially difficult to date, but Amenhotep III was the only Eighteenth dynasty pharaoh who had colossal statues of this size and they were found only in his mortuary temple and at Medinet Habu; this helped to match the pieces to the colossus in the Cairo museum. With the newly found parts added the statue is 70% complete.

== See also ==
- Colossal red granite statue of Amenhotep III
