= Statuette of the lady Tiye =

Ancient Egyptian wooden statuette

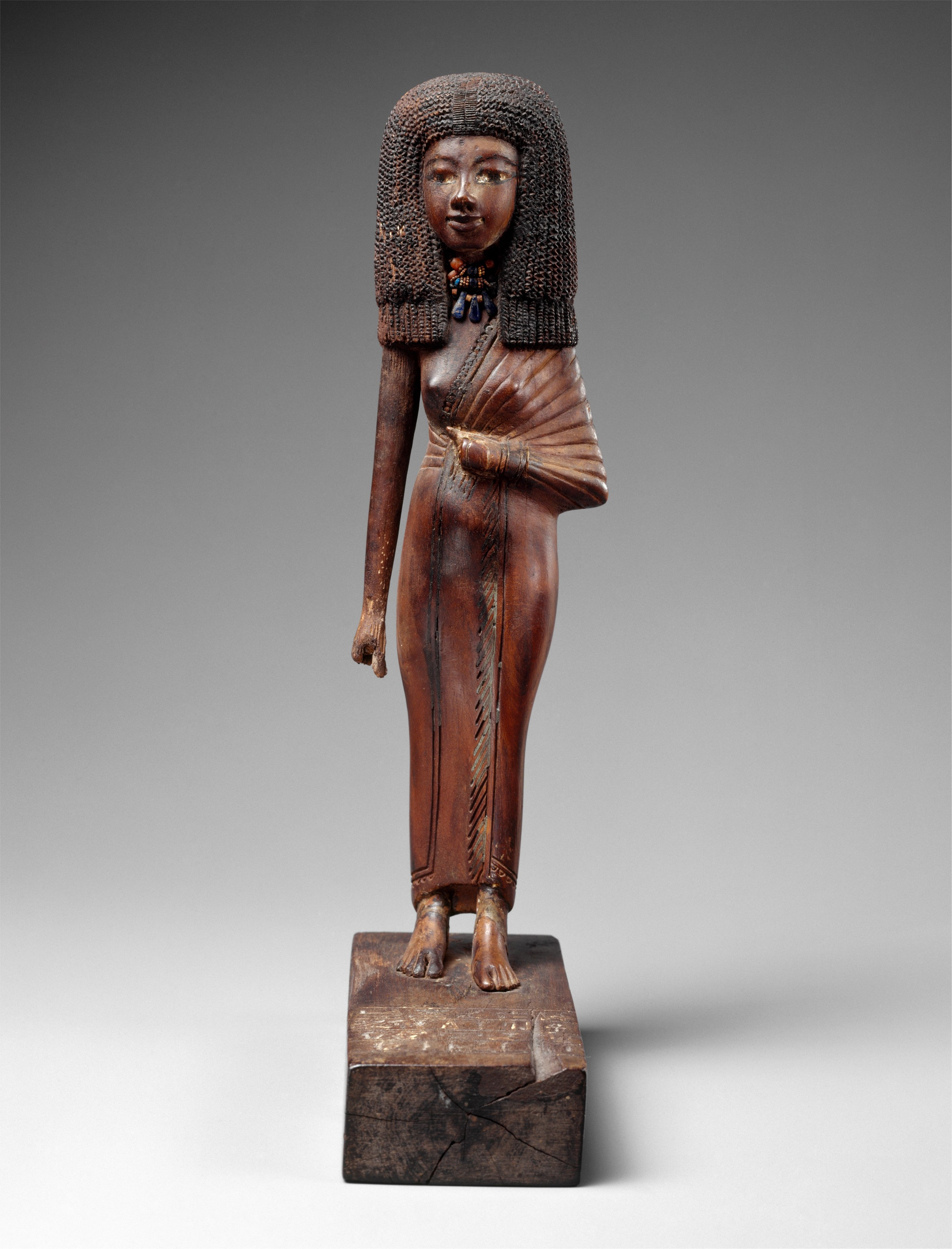
- Material: Wood
- Length: 12.5 cm
- Height: 24 cm
- Width: 5.1 cm
- Created: c. 1370 BC
- Discovered: 1900; Egypt
- Present location: Metropolitan Museum of Art, New York, United States
- Identification: 41.2.10a

The Statuette of the lady Tiye is a wooden statue of a high-status woman from the reign of Amenhotep III or Akhenaten (ca. 1390–1349 BC); 18th Dynasty of the New Kingdom of Egypt. Believed to depict a leading servant of the powerful Great Royal Wife Tiye (her superior, with whom she may have shared the same name), her title has been variously translated over the years as "Chief of Weavers" / "Chief of the Household" / "mistress of the harim". It is one of only around 160 wooden statues (80 of them female) discovered from the New Kingdom. It currently resides in the Metropolitan Museum of Art.

== Description ==
The statuette shows Tiye standing upright and was found in 1900 together with four other statuettes of women and one statue of a young girl in a tomb near Gurob. The tomb also contained several cosmetic objects, including alabaster vessels and a mirror. Some objects were inscribed with the name of king Amenhotep III and his wife queen Tiye, providing a dating for the burial.

In addition to wood, it is embellished with gold, semi-precious stones, and glass, used for the jewelry around her neck. Her left arm is bent to hold her dress. Around her neck are beads of "gold, carnelian, and other semi-precious stones" assembled into a necklace. She wears a long wig and a "soft, diaphanous robe", which hangs over her left shoulder, cinches at her waist, and extends down to her feet. The "wondrously elaborate" wig is intricately detailed and carefully rendered, including three long braids at the back of her head. The detail of the wig stands in contrast to that of her relatively simple dress, which uses sharp sunken lines to indicate gathering in the fabric around her arm and imprecise hashing for patterns on the garment. Like most female wooden statues, she stands barefoot with her left foot slightly forward. She stands on a base inscribed with an offering passage to Mut, Lady of Heaven, and gives Tiye's title of Chief of Weavers.

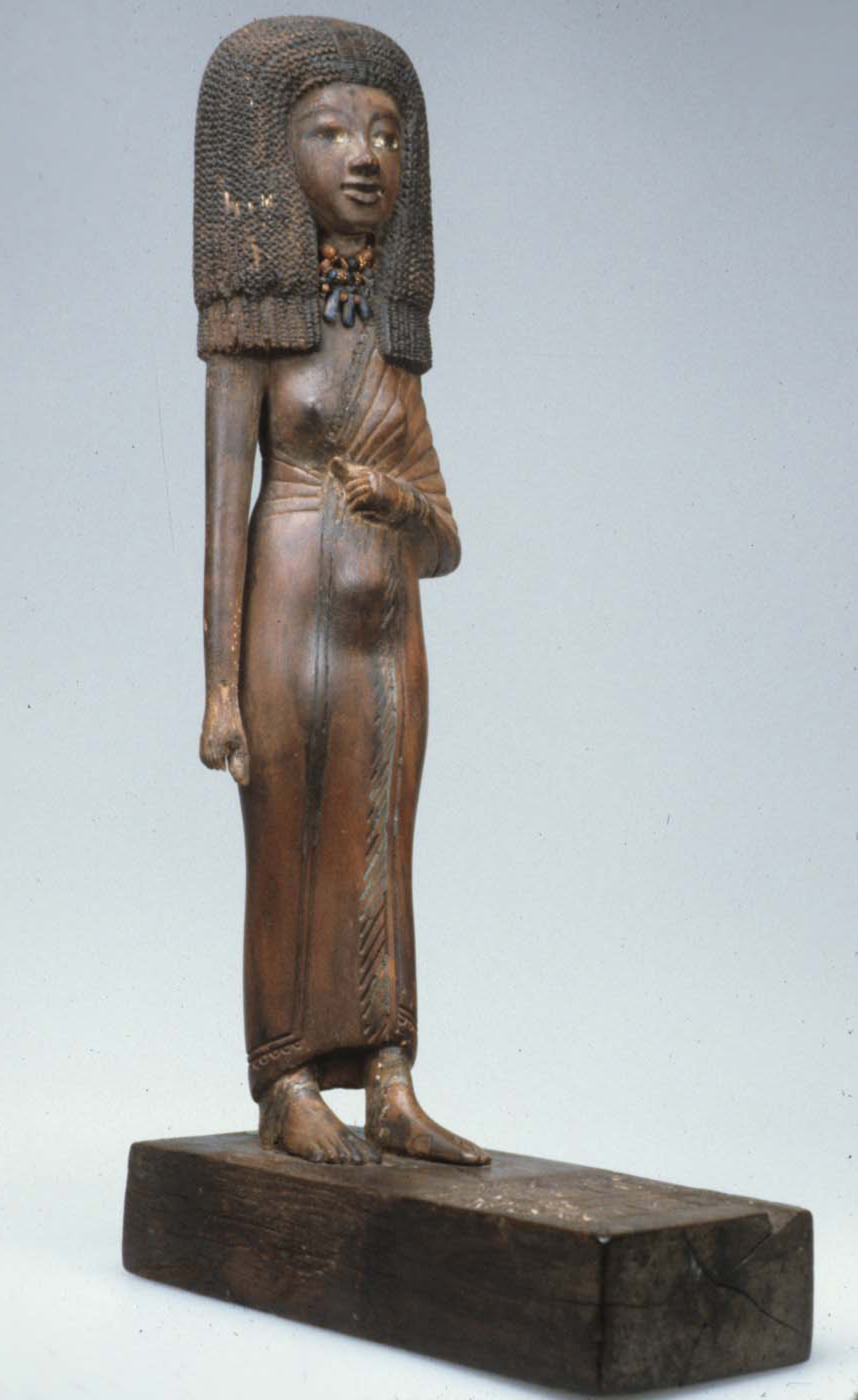
Statuette of the lady Tiye MET 41.2.10 01

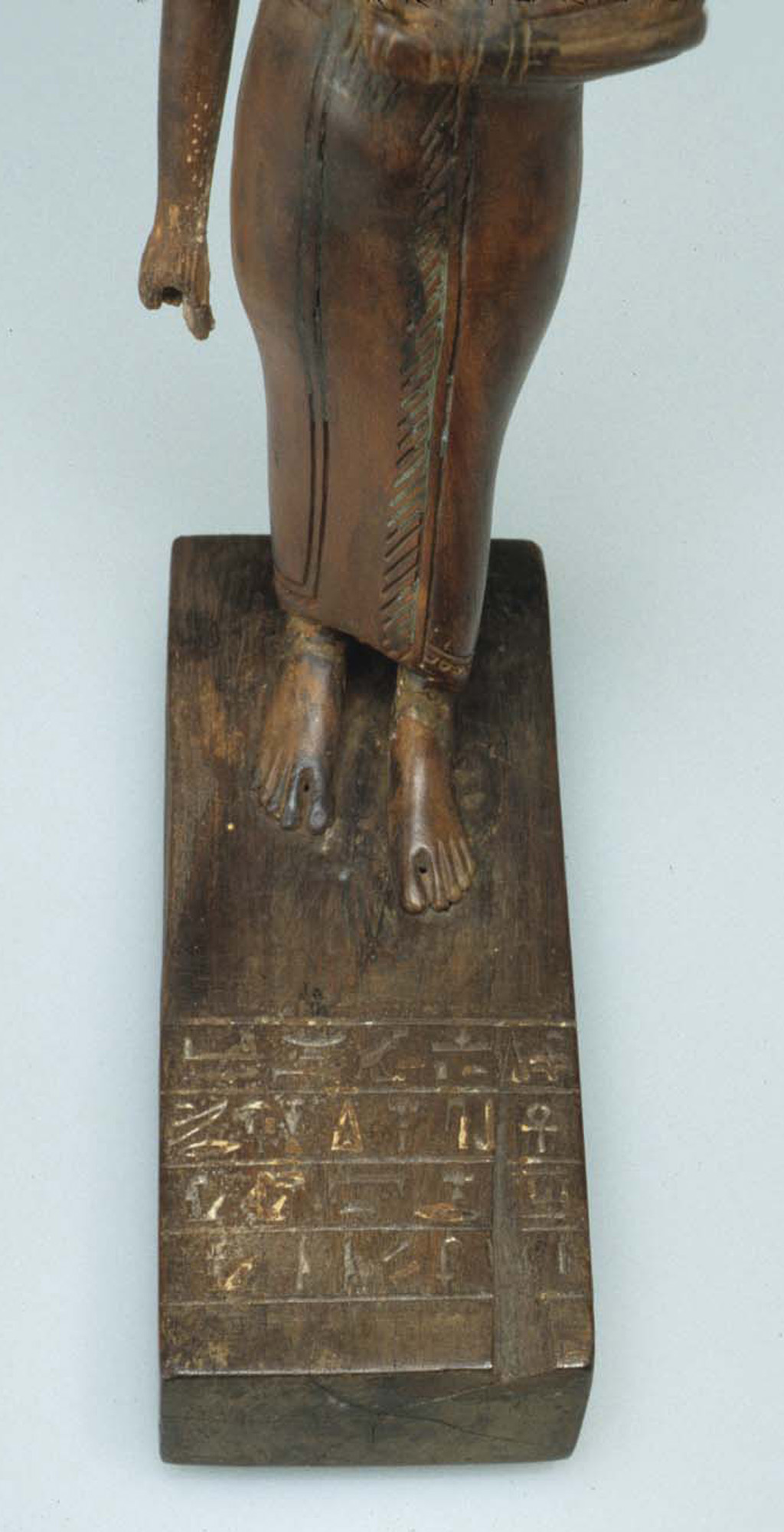
Statuette of the lady Tiye MET 41.2.10 05

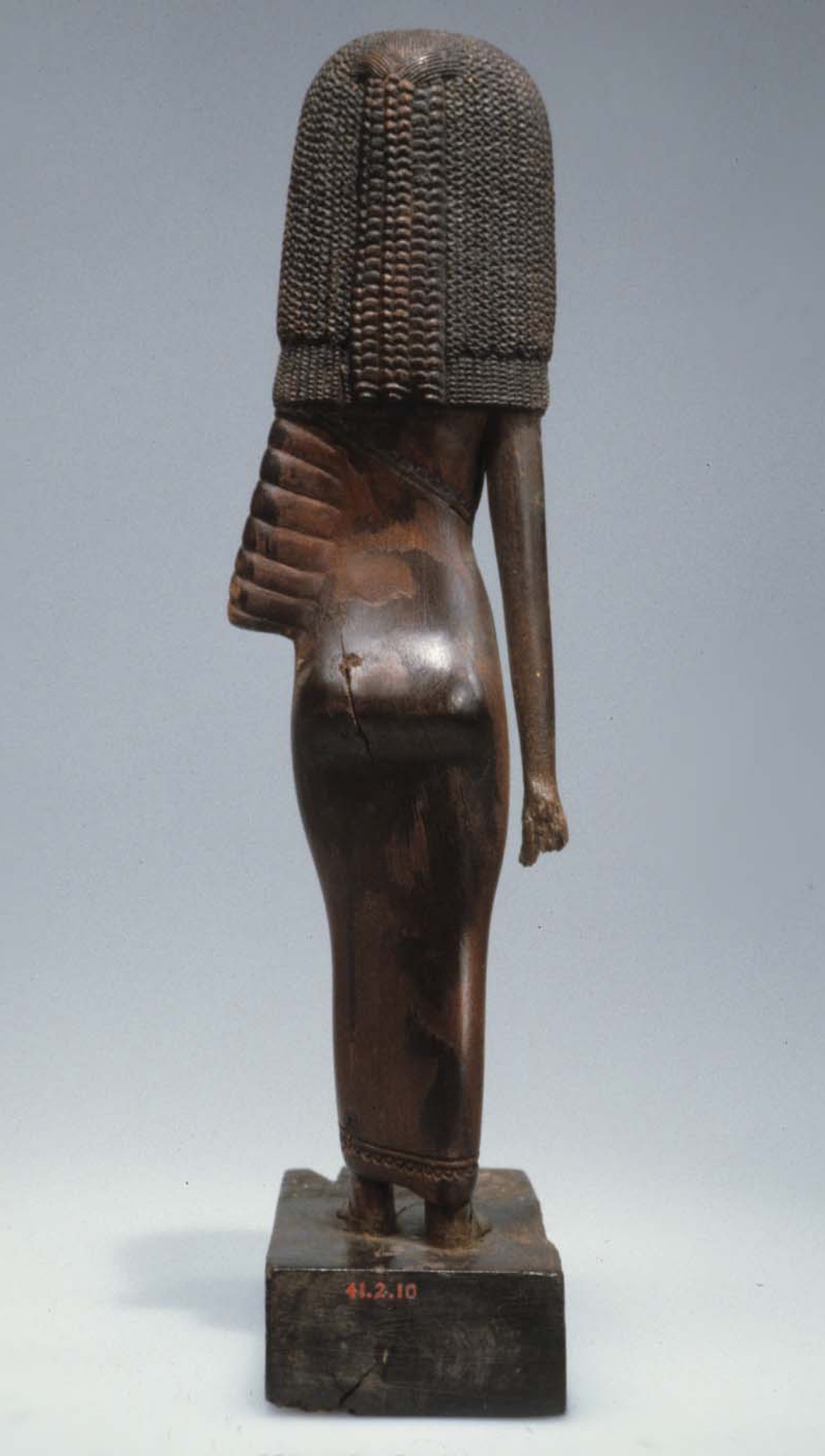
Statuette of the lady Tiye MET 41.2.10 02

== Material ==
Wooden statuary was almost as common as stone statuary in Ancient Egypt, but due to its susceptibility to continuous decay and damage from the presence of termites at the time, this statuette is one of a very small group that remain. Over three-quarters of discovered New Kingdom wood statues are from the reign of Amenhotep III to the end of the dynasty.

The statuette is made of ebony. It was likely made from only two pieces; the figure from one piece of wood, and the base from another, since statues smaller than 30 cm were usually carved from one piece of wood. There are a few cracks in the wood. The main damage to the statuette is a sizable crack on Tiye's behind. The wood around Tiye's right hand is rotting, and much of her finger details have disintegrated. There is also a chunk of wood missing from the platform, destroying part of the inscription.

The statuette was originally painted Egyptian blue. The paint has since worn away, exposing the wood. Faint black and white pigment remains, delineating her eyes and eyebrows. Painted designs detailing her costume and jewelry would have covered it.

== Style and identification ==
The intricate drapery of her garment and how details were carved into the wood rather than only painted was a development in wood sculpture that occurred towards the end of the 18th Dynasty. The orderliness of the cut and style of the wig depicted indicates her status. This wig style was commonly depicted on elite and noble women of the period.

=== Proportion and form ===
On stylistic grounds, Hayes dates the statuette to the co-regency of Amenhotep III and Amenhotep IV (Akhenaten). Her wig and face are "disproportionately large"; and, as was conventional, "the curves of her body are a trifle overemphasized". Her face is not, however, elongated, and neither is her neck, which are trademarks of Amarna art.

=== Decoration ===
The use of gold, citrine, and other stones to resemble a necklace around the neck of the figure would indicate power and status. The long inscription indicates that in addition to Lady Tiye's name/title, is her offering formula and dedication done by a family member, honoring her as deceased.

== Later history ==
The statuette was first described by Émile Chassinat in 1901, and was subsequently owned by Martine Behague and then by Dikran Kelekian, from whom the Metropolitan Museum of Art bought it in 1941 thanks to the Rogers Fund. The statuette is currently on view in "The Met Fifth Avenue in Gallery 119".
