= Nebetah =

- Princess of Egypt
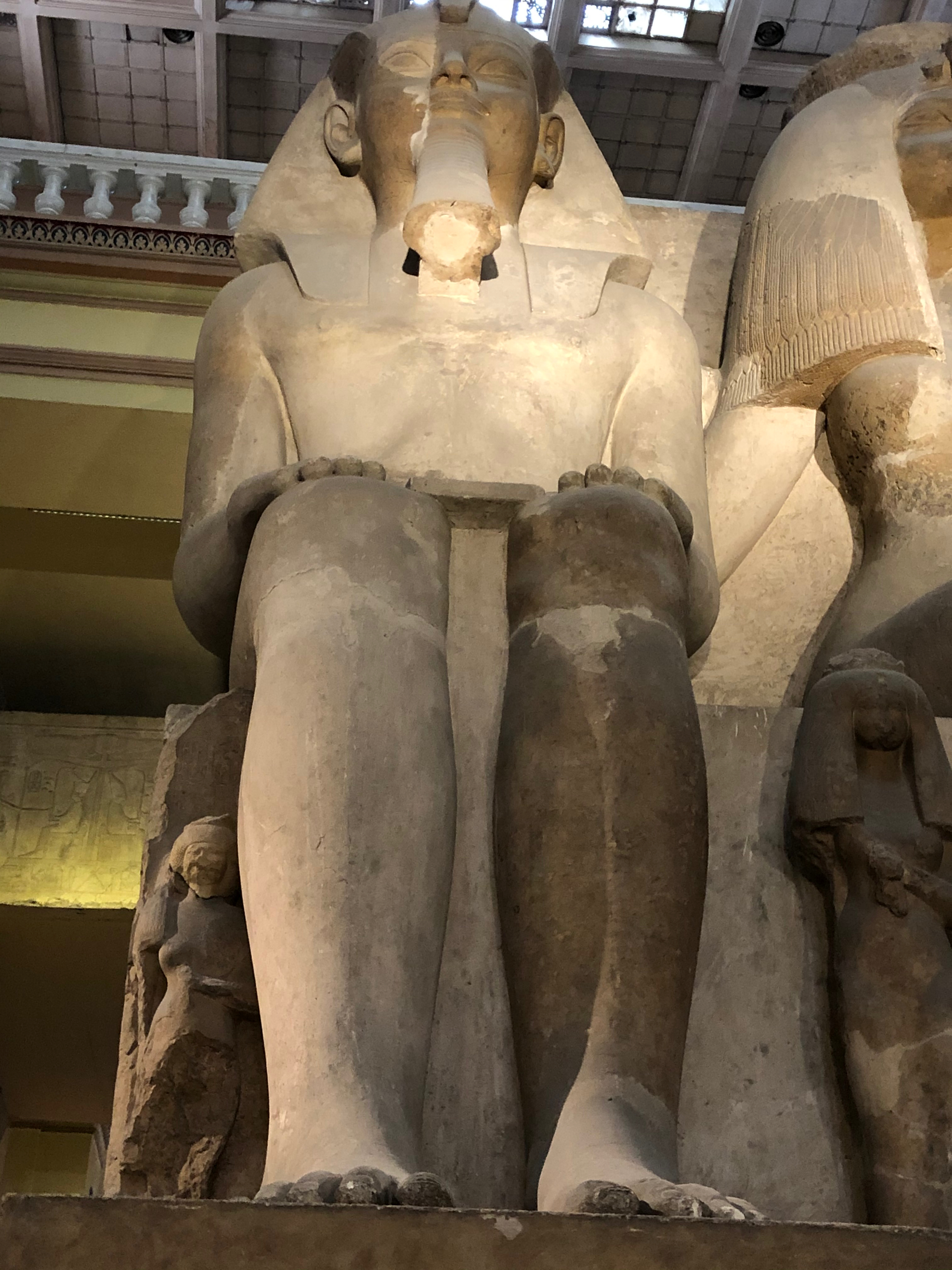
- Nebetah depicted to her father's right on the Colossal statue of Amenhotep III and Tiye, the Egyptian Museum, Cairo.
Egyptian name
nb t O11 a pr B1
- Dynasty: 18th of Egypt
- Father: Amenhotep III
- Mother: Tiye
- Religion: Ancient Egyptian religion

Nebetah (Ancient Egyptian: nb.t-ꜥḥ) was one of the daughters of ancient Egyptian pharaoh Amenhotep III of the 18th Dynasty and his Great Royal Wife Tiye. She was a younger sister of Akhenaten.

== Biography ==
Nebetah's name means Lady of the Palace. Her name, like that of her elder sister Henuttaneb, was also frequently used as a title for queens. She was possibly one of the youngest of the royal couple's children, since she does not appear on monuments on which her elder sisters do. She is shown on a colossal statue from Medinet Habu. This huge seven-metre-high (23 ft) sculpture shows Amenhotep III and Tiye seated side by side, "with three of their daughters standing in front of the throne--Henuttaneb, the largest and best preserved, in the centre; Nebetah on the right; and another, whose name is destroyed, on the left."

Unlike her sisters Sitamun and Isis, she was never elevated to the rank of queen, and her only known title is King's Daughter Whom He Loves (the usual title for princesses). This, combined with the fact that after Amenhotep III's death she ceases to be mentioned, suggests that she died at an early age. It was once suggested that she was renamed during the Atenist reforms started by her brother, and is identical with Princess Beketaten who was never mentioned before the reforms.

The mummy known as The Younger Lady has been identified as the mother of Tutankhamun. Nebetah or Beketaten have been considered as the possible identity of this mummy.
