= Henuttaneb =

- Princess of Egypt
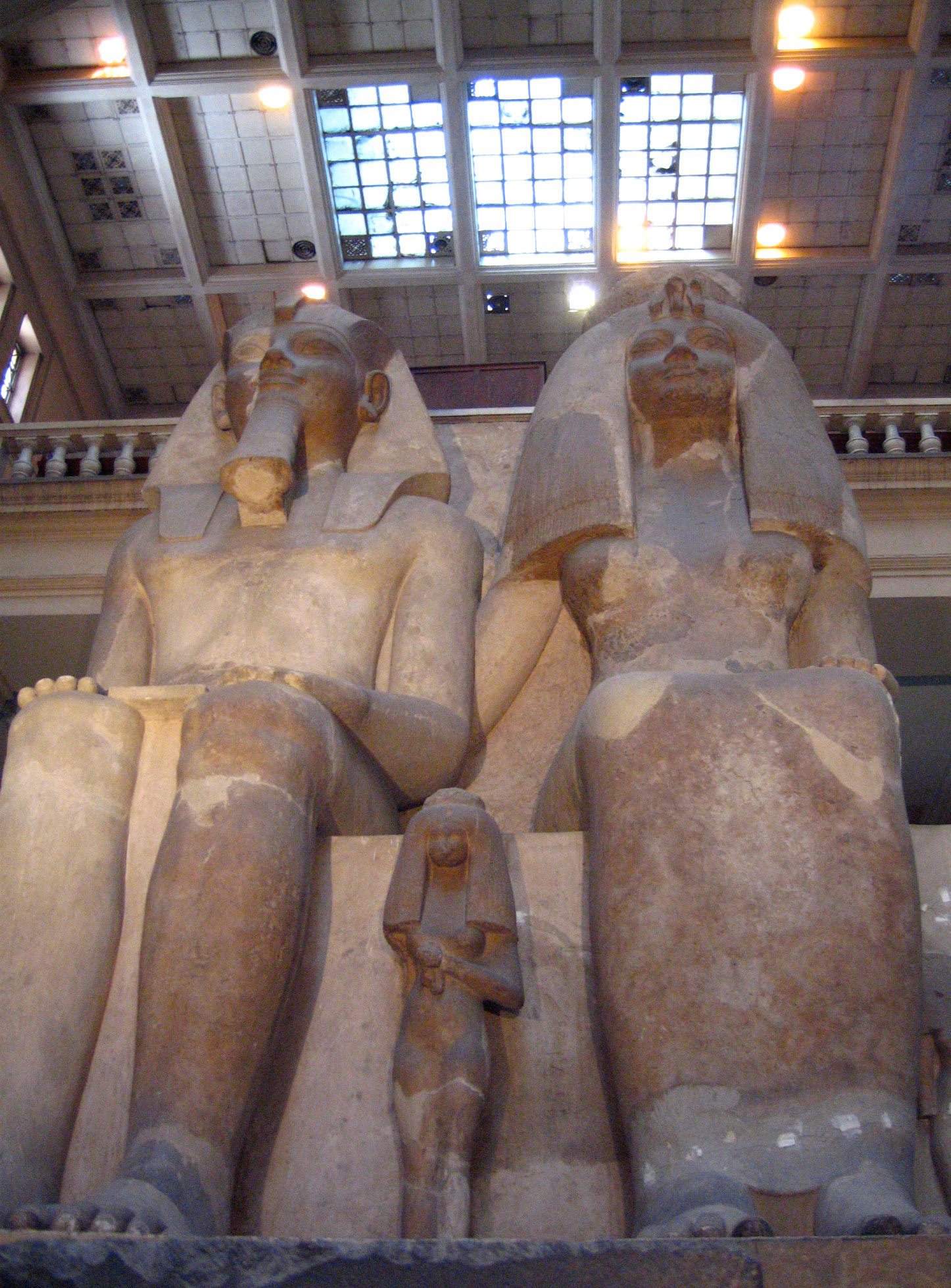
- Colossal statues (JE 33906), between her parents, Amenhotep III and Tiye, there stands Henuttaneb, Egyptian Museum (Cairo).
Egyptian name
H nw t tA N21 Z1 nb
- Dynasty: 18th of Egypt
- Father: Amenhotep III
- Mother: Tiye
- Religion: Ancient Egyptian religion

Henuttaneb was an Ancient Egyptian princess of the Eighteenth Dynasty and daughter of pharaoh Amenhotep III and his Great Royal Wife, Queen Tiye.

== Family ==
Henuttaneb was one of the daughters of ancient Egyptian Pharaoh Amenhotep III of the 18th Dynasty and his Great Royal Wife, Queen Tiye. She was a sister of Pharaoh Akhenaten. She also had several more siblings – one other brother and several sisters.

Henuttaneb's name means Lady of All Lands and was also frequently used as a title for queens. She was the third daughter of her parents (after Sitamun and Isis, also called Iset).

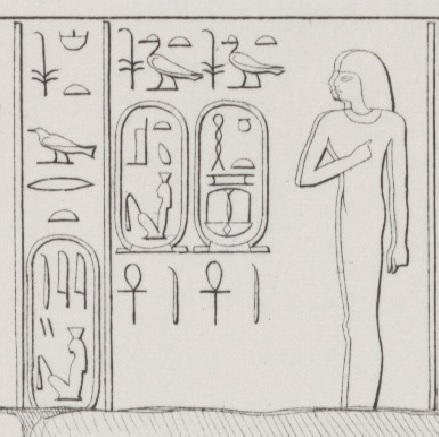
Henuttaneb depicted alongside her sister, Iset

== Biography ==
Henuttaneb is shown on a colossal statue from Medinet Habu. This huge seven-metre-high (23 ft) sculpture shows Amenhotep III and Tiye seated side by side, "with three of their daughters standing in front of the throne--Henuttaneb, the largest and best preserved, in the centre; Nebetah on the right; and another, whose name is destroyed, on the left". She also appears in the temple at Soleb and on a carnelian plaque (with her sister Iset, before their parents). Her name appears on three faience fragments.

It is unclear whether Henuttaneb was elevated to the rank of queen like Sitamun and Iset. She is nowhere mentioned as King's Wife, but on the aforementioned carnelian plaque her name is enclosed in a cartouche, a privilege which only kings and their wives were entitled to. This by itself cannot serve as evidence that she became queen. Although princesses' names are generally not enclosed in cartouches, this is not unheard of either. In the early Eighteenth Dynasty, the princess Neferubity, the princess and God's Wife Neferure, and the princess Merytnub all had cartouches. On the famous statue Cairo JE 33906, both Henuttaneb and her younger sister Nebetah, who was still very young, have cartouches.

After the death of her father, she is not mentioned again.
