= Gurob =

Archaeological site in Egypt

Coordinates: 29°12′00″N 30°57′00″E

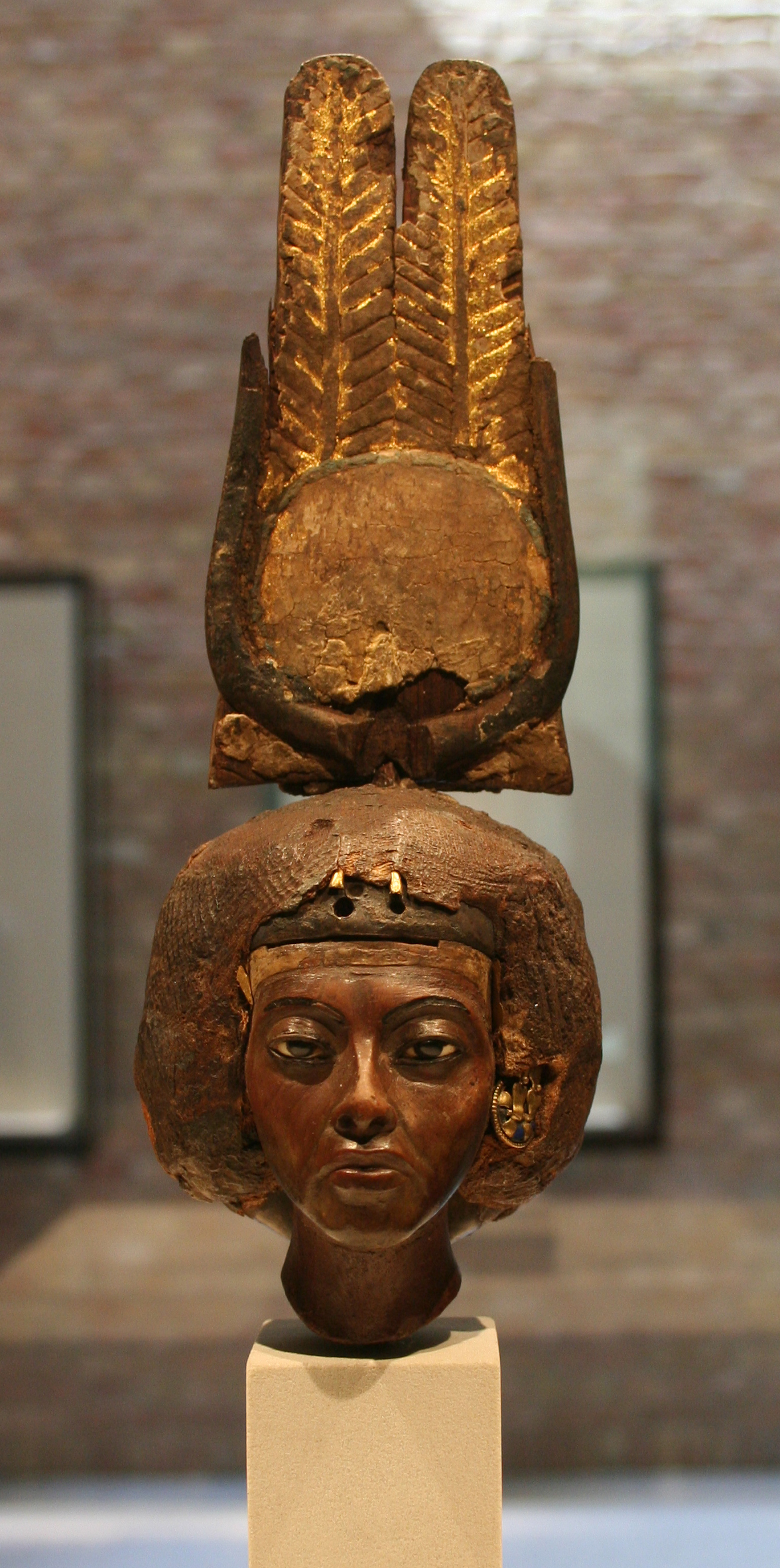
Head of queen Tiye

Gurob, also known as Ghurab, Medinet Gurob or Kom Medinet Gurob is an archaeological site in Egypt, close to the Fayum. In the New Kingdom it was the place of a palace and was called Merwer.

The remains were several times the target of excavations, the most important on by Guy Brunton and Reginald Engelbach from 11 January – 6 April 1920. The excavations found several cemeteries, some dating back to the Old Kingdom, but most of them belonging to the New Kingdom. Gurob is the provenance of many important finds, including a head of queen Tiye, now in the Egyptian Museum of Berlin. From a papyrus fragment found at the site, it is known that queen Maathorneferure lived here. She was the daughter of a Hittite king and wife of Ramesses II. Other notable finds are burials with artistic high quality statuettes, such as the Statuette of the lady Tiye, and the burial of Ramesses-Meryamun-Nebweben, one of Ramesses II's younger sons.

The area had a Temple to Neith and mummified Nile perch have been found in its vicinity.
