= Iset (daughter of Amenhotep III) =

- Princess of Egypt
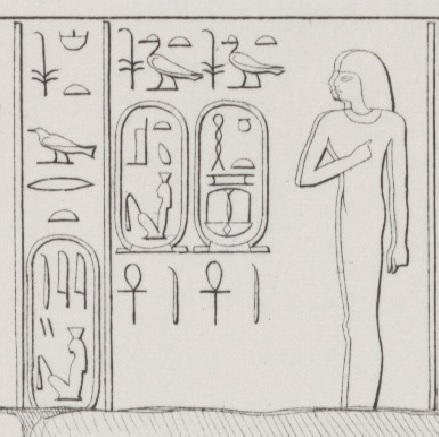
- Iset and Henuttaneb
- Spouse: Amenhotep III
Egyptian name
st t H8 B7
- Dynasty: 18th of Egypt
- Father: Amenhotep III
- Mother: Tiye
- Religion: Ancient Egyptian religion

Iset or Aset was a Princess of Egypt.

== Family ==
Iset was one of the daughters of ancient Egyptian pharaoh Amenhotep III of the 18th Dynasty and his Great Royal Wife Tiye. She was a sister of Akhenaten. Iset's other brother was Crown Prince Thutmose I.

Her name is the original Egyptian version of the name Isis. It is likely she was the royal couple's second daughter (after Sitamun). She became her father's wife in Year 34 of Amenhotep's reign, around Amenhotep's second sed festival.

She appears in the temple at Soleb with her parents and her sister Henuttaneb, and on a carnelian plaque (now in the Metropolitan Museum of Art, New York City) with Henuttaneb, before their parents. A box found in Gurob and a pair of kohl-tubes probably belonged to her.

After the death of her father she is not mentioned again.
