= Thutmose (prince) =

Eldest son of Pharaoh Amenhotep III

Crown Prince Thutmose
- Crown Prince of Egypt
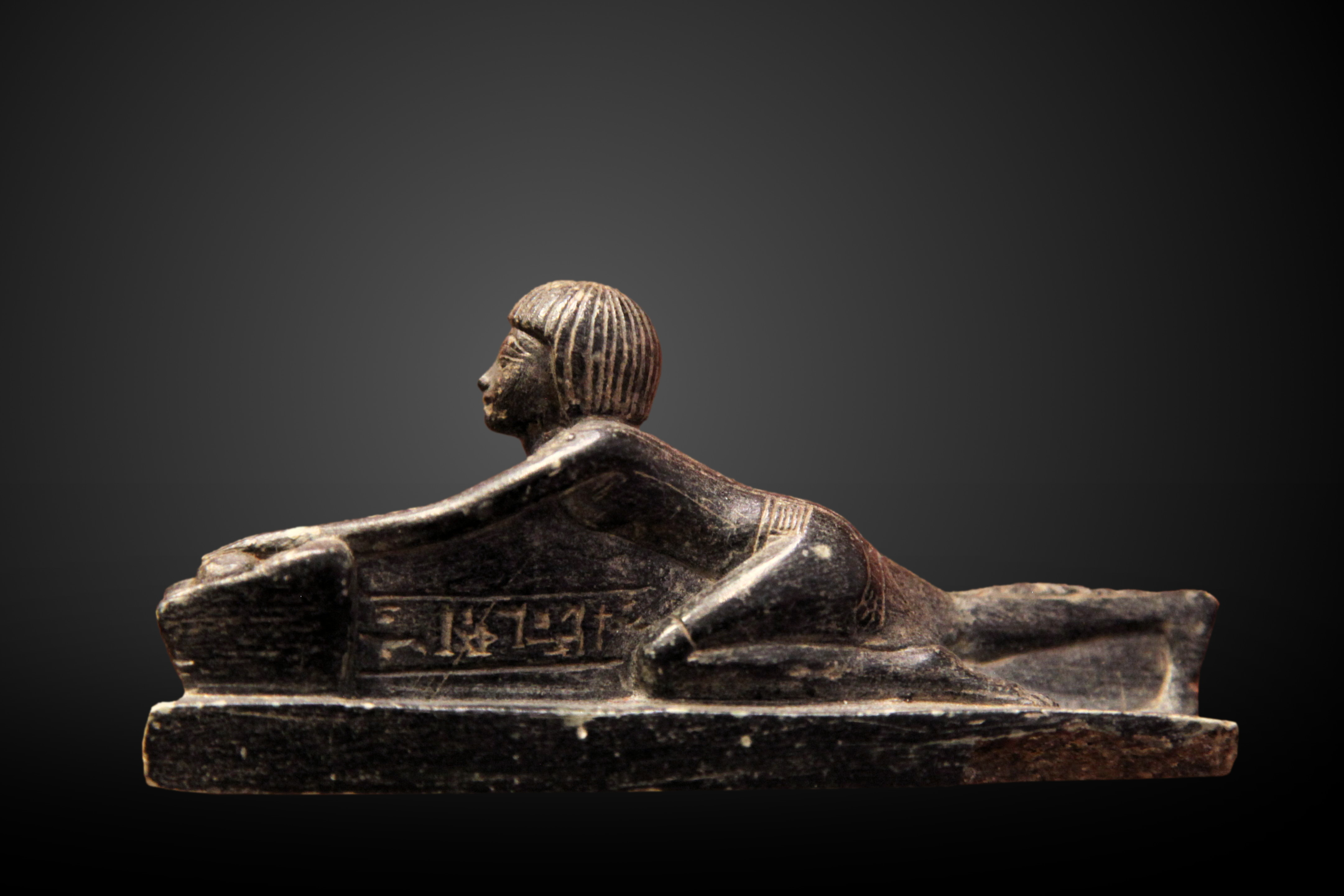
- Schist statuette of Thutmose grinding grain, now in the Louvre
- Dynasty: 18th of Egypt
- Father: Amenhotep III
- Mother: Tiye

Crown Prince Thutmose (Ancient Egyptian: ḏḥwti-ms(.w): "Born of Thoth") was the eldest son, and original heir apparent, of Pharaoh Amenhotep III and Queen Tiye during the Eighteenth Dynasty of Egypt. He was also the elder brother of Amenhotep IV, who would later become known as Akhenaten.

== Early life ==
Not much is known about Thutmose's early life. Thutmose died relatively young, which left a lasting impact on the dynasty's line of succession. Although he was heir to Amenhotep III, his early death led to his younger brother, Amenhotep, taking over as Crown Prince. As such, this event is a direct precursor to the Atenist heresy, the Amarna letters, and the eventual rise of Ramesses II, as well as the changing roles of the kingdom's powers.

== Career ==
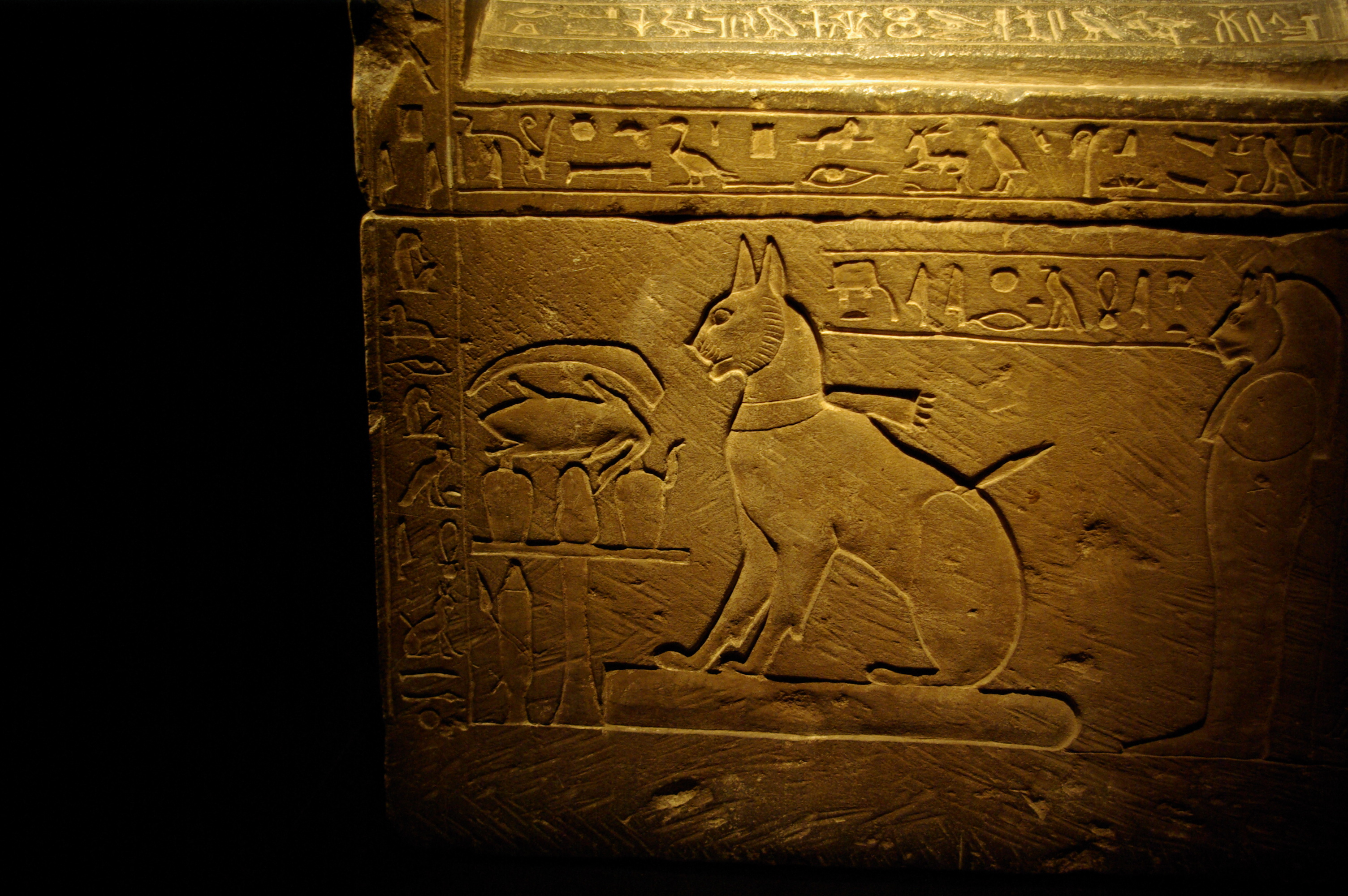
Sarcophagus of Prince Thutmose's cat, Ta-miu

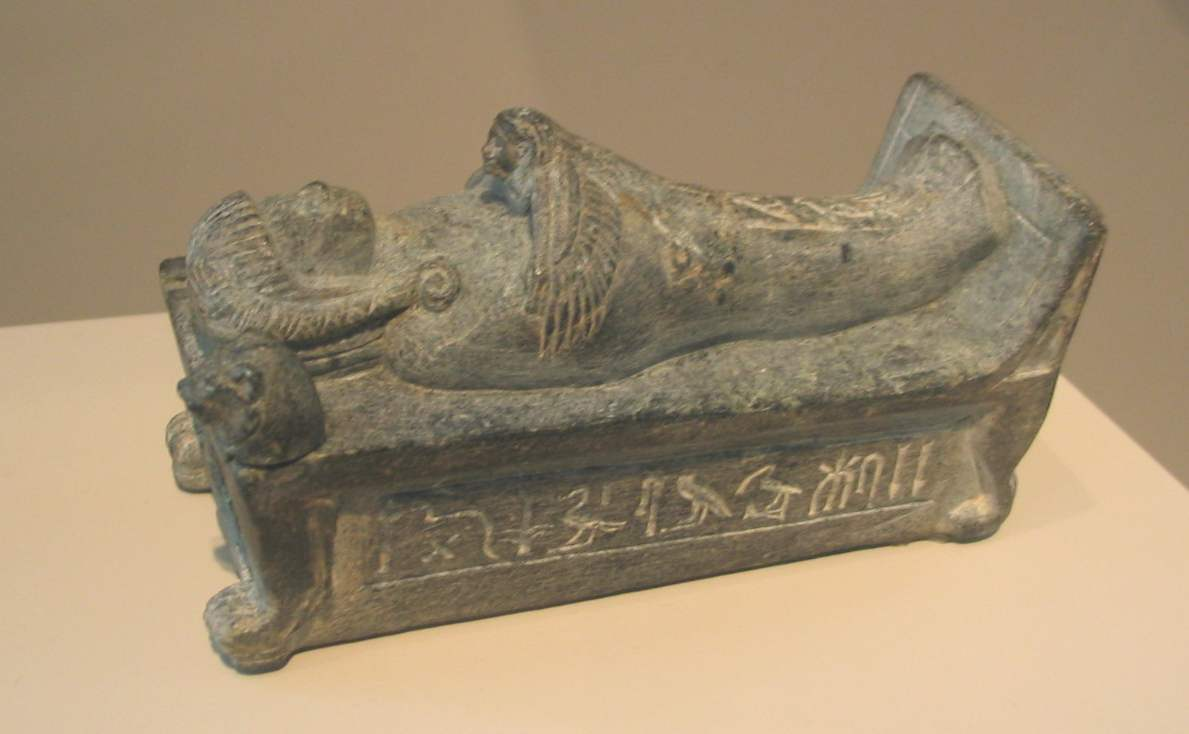
Schist sculpture depicting Prince Thutmose as a mummy lying on a bier with a ba-bird on his chest

Prince Thutmose served as a High Priest and Sem-Priest of Ptah in ancient Memphis, the latter of which leads funerary responsibilities. His full royal titles were "Crown Prince, Overseer of the Priests of Upper and Lower Egypt, High Priest of Ptah in Memphis and Sm-priest (of Ptah)."

He is known from a relatively small number of objects. A small schist statuette in the Louvre Museum shows the prince as a miller, while another small schist statue in Berlin depicts him as a mummy lying on a bier. The miller statuette is inscribed on three sides with this text:

(right)...the king's son the sem-priest Djhutmose; (left) I am the servant of this noble god, his miller; (front) Incense for the Ennead of the western necropolis.

Prince Thutmose is best remembered for the limestone sarcophagus of his cat, Ta-miu (she-cat), now in the Cairo Museum. Ta-miu's sarcophagus explicitly refers to Thutmose with the title Crown Prince, conclusively establishing that he was, in fact, the then eldest son of Amenhotep III.' Thutmose is also attested by a total of seven pairs of calcite and pottery vases in the Louvre in Paris.

== Death ==
Prince Thutmose disappears from the public record, and appears to have died some time fairly late during the third decade of Amenhotep III's kingship.
