= Tiye =

U33 i i Z4 B7
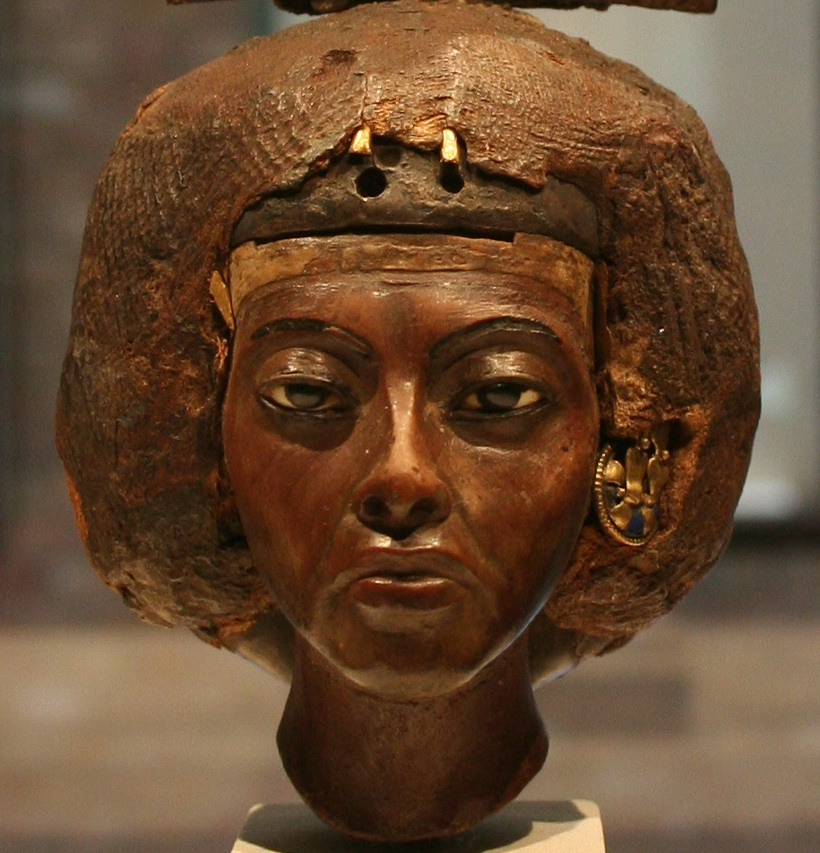
- Bust of Tiye, now in the Egyptian Museum of Berlin in Germany

Queen consort of Egypt
- Tenure: c. 1390 - c. 1353 BC
- Pharaoh: Amenhotep III
- Born: c. 1398 BC
- Died: c. 1338 BC (aged c. 60)
- Burial: National Museum of Egyptian Civilization, Cairo, Egypt
- Spouse: Amenhotep III
- Issue: Sitamun; Amenhotep IV; Thutmose; Iset; Henuttaneb; Nebetah
- Dynasty: 18th Dynasty of Egypt
- Father: Yuya
- Mother: Thuya
- Religion: Ancient Egyptian religion

Tiye (c. 1398 BC – c. 1338 BC, also spelled Tye, Taia, Tiy and Tiyi) was the Great Royal Wife of the Egyptian pharaoh Amenhotep III, mother of pharaoh Amenhotep IV and grandmother of pharaoh Tutankhamun; her parents were Yuya and Thuya. In 2010, DNA analysis confirmed her as the mummy known as "The Elder Lady" found in the Tomb of Amenhotep II in 1898.

== Family and early life ==
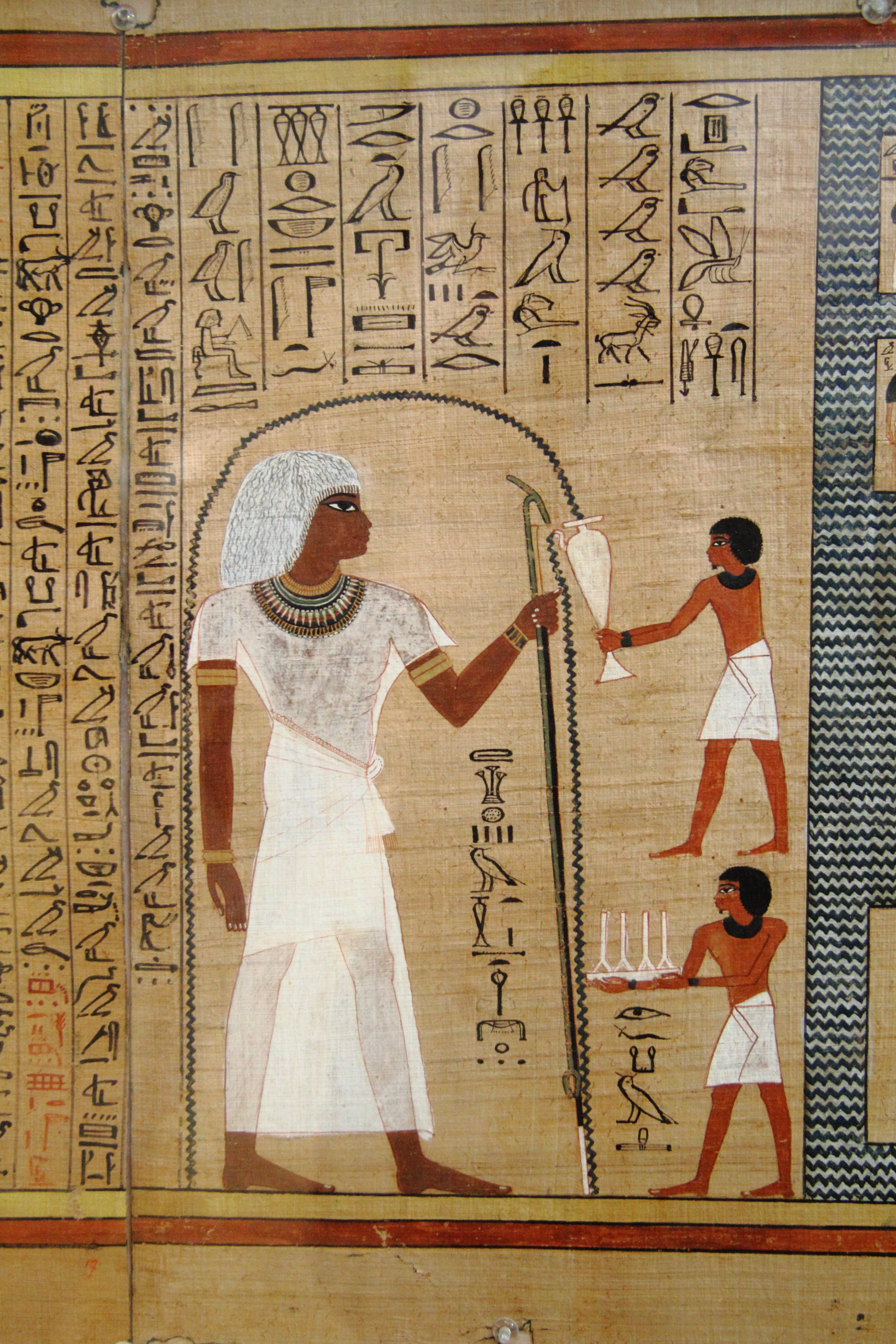
Depiction of Tiye's father Yuya in his copy of the Book of the Dead

Tiye's father, Yuya, was a non-royal, wealthy landowner from the Upper Egyptian town of Akhmim, where he served as a priest and superintendent of oxen or commander of the chariotry. Tiye's mother, Thuya, was involved in many religious cults, as her different titles attested (Singer of Hathor, Chief of the Entertainers of both Amun and Min...). Sometimes it is believed that Thuya is likely to be of royal descent.

Egyptologists have suggested that Tiye's father, Yuya, was of foreign origin due to the features of his mummy and the many different spellings of his name, which might imply it was a non-Egyptian name in origin. Some suggest that the queen's strong political and unconventional religious views might have been due not just to a strong character, but to foreign descent. However, a growing number of scholars—especially more recent ones—argue that Tiye and her parents were of indigenous Egyptian origin, originating from Akhmim, and maintain that Yuya’s name shows no phonological features characteristic of a foreign language.

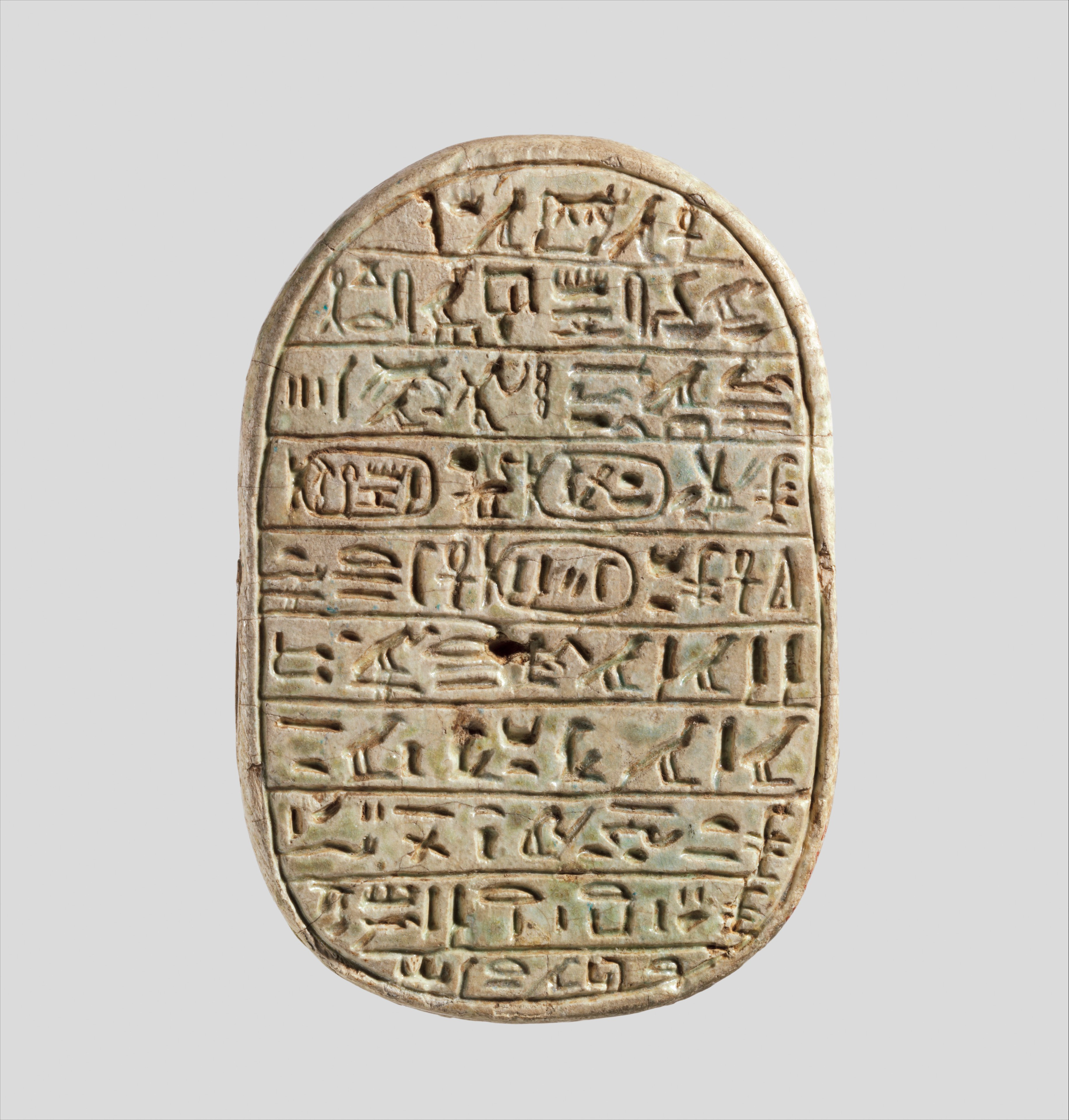
Commemorative marriage scarab of Amenhotep III and Tiye

Recent studies indicate that Tiye, Amenhotep III, and their descendants shared certain medical conditions. Tiye, Amenhotep III, The KV55 mummy, Tutankhamun, and KV35YL all suffered from scoliosis and overbite. Additionally, Amenhotep III and his father-in-law Yuya share one third of their genetic genes, suggesting that Yuya was likely Amenhotep III's uncle. However, the possibility that Yuya was a brother of Thutmose IV is almost inconceivable, making it more likely instead that that Yuya was the brother of Mutemwiya. Furthermore, through DNA comparison, KV21A has been identified as a sister of Yuya and is believed to possibly be Mutemwiya, but that is contradicted by the fact she is also identified as probable mother of Tutankhamun's children, so probably Ankhesenamun (Yuya's great-granddaughter). However, allele studies suggest that either the KV55 mummy is not Amenhotep IV, or neither of Tutankhamun's two daughters were born to Ankhesenamun or any of Akhenaten's daughters. Meanwhile, the mummy identified in 2010 as Ankhesenamun is now considered, based on the tomb's structure and the genetic characteristics of one of the mummies, to more likely belong to Mutemwiya.

Tiye also had a brother, Anen, who was Second Prophet of Amun. Ay, a successor of Tutankhamun as pharaoh after the latter's death, is believed to be yet another brother of Tiye, despite no clear date or monument confirming a link between the two. Egyptologists presume this connection from Ay's origins (also from Akhmim), because he is known to have built a chapel dedicated to the local god Min there, and because he inherited most of the titles that Tiye's father, Yuya, held at the court of Amenhotep III during his lifetime.

Tiye was married to Amenhotep III by the second year of his reign. In the past, it was believed that the ancient Egyptian kingship was transmitted through the female line, and that a pharaoh established his legitimacy by marrying a royal heiress. This theory has now been abandoned, and it is no longer considered unusual for a king’s chief queen to be of non-royal origin. However, the very young age at which Amenhotep III married makes it more likely that his marriage was closely connected with his mother, Mutemwiya, who probably acted as regent during the early years of his reign. Moreover, DNA evidence indicates that through her, Amenhotep III was linked by close blood ties to his father-in-law. Their marriage was celebrated by the issue of commemorative scarabs, announcing Tiye as Great Royal Wife and giving the names of her parents. He appears to have been crowned while still a child, perhaps between the ages of 6 and 12. Since Amenhotep III was too young to rule independently when he became pharaoh, scholars have proposed that a regency council was formed around the young king. Tiye's parents are believed to have been members of this council, which is why they were consistently mentioned as the queen's parents on the commemorative scarabs. The dissolution of this regency council is thought to have occurred in the 11th year of the pharaoh's reign, as from that year onward, commemorative scarabs mentioning Tiye's parents ceased to be issued.

=== Children ===
Tiye and her husband had 6 confirmed children:

- Sitamun (c. 1375 - c. 1350 BC): The eldest daughter, who was elevated to the position of Great Royal Wife around year 30 of her father's reign
- Amenhotep IV (c. 1373 - c. 1335 BC): Succeeded his father as pharaoh, husband of Queen Nefertiti, father of Ankhesenamun, who married Tutankhamun
- Thutmose (died c. 1360 BC): Crown Prince and High Priest of Ptah
- Iset: Also elevated to the position of Great Royal Wife
- Henuttaneb: Not known to have been elevated to queenship, though her name does appear in a cartouche at least once
- Nebetah: Sometimes thought to have been renamed Baketaten during her brother's reign

=== Possible children ===
Additionally, there are speculations about 3 further offspring:

- Smenkhkare: has been speculated to be a son to Tiye but in fact primary sources that list her other children make this unlikely. Traditionally seen as one of Akhenaten's immediate successors, today some Egyptologists such as Aidan Dodson believe he was the immediate predecessor of Neferneferuaten and a junior co-regent of Akhenaten who did not have an independent reign. Sometimes identified with the mummy from KV55, and therefore Tutankhamun's father.
- Anonymous mummy from KV35, called "the Younger Lady": according to genetic testing in 2010, she is a daughter of Amenhotep III and Tiye (presumably one of the already known), mother of Tutankhamun and sister-wife of KV55. However, there are concerns that due to poor condition of DNA and inbreeding within royal family, results should be interpreted differently; one of the alternative readings of tests suggests that the Younger Lady is Amenhotep III's and Tiye's granddaughter, Meritaten, rather than their daughter.
- Beketaten: Sometimes thought to be Queen Tiye's daughter, usually based on reliefs of Baketaten seated next to Tiye at dinner with Amenhotep IV and Queen Nefertiti. Probably Nebetah who likely changed her name when her brother Amenhotep IV changed the religion.

== Monuments ==
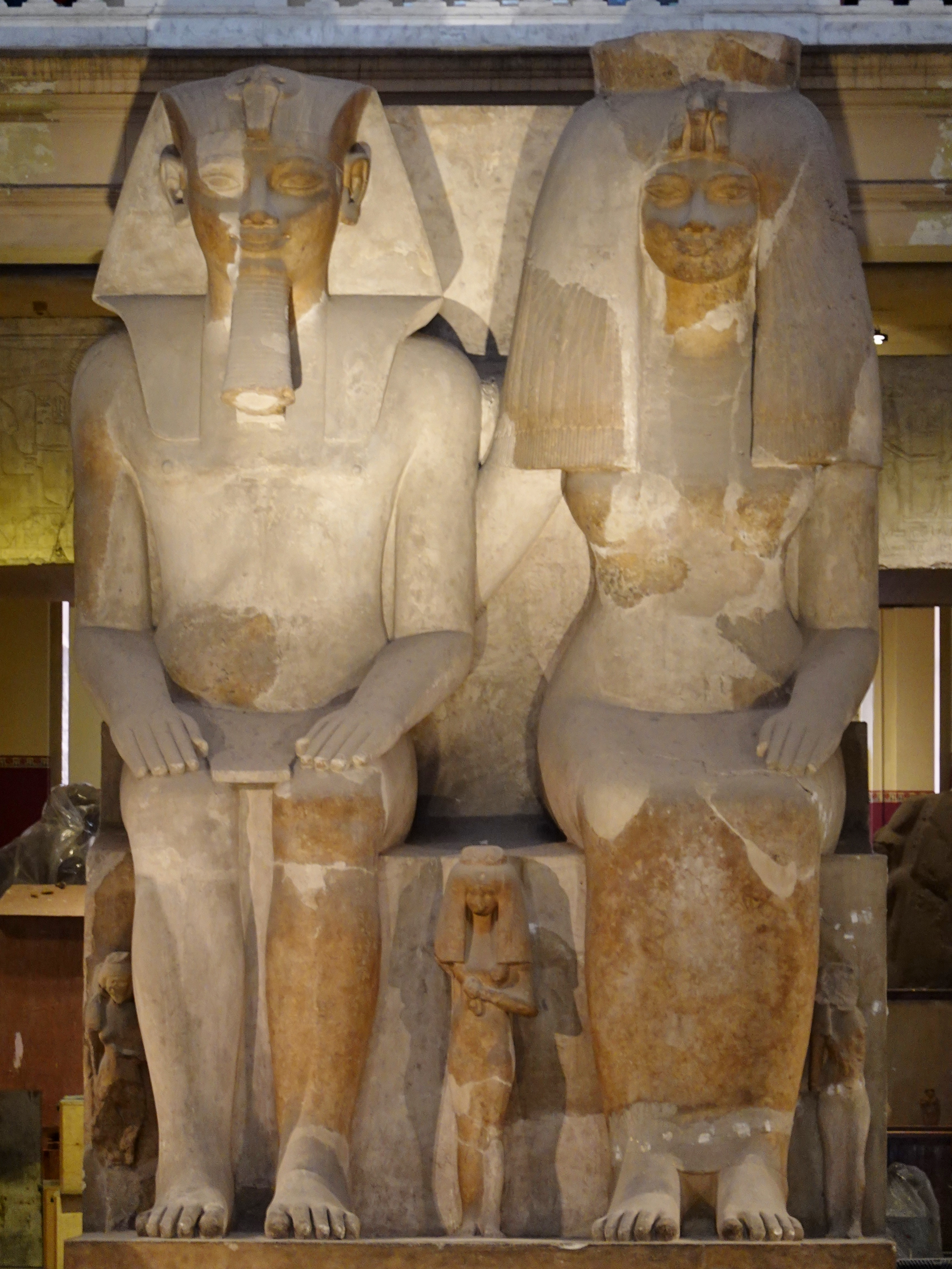
Colossal statue of Amenhotep III and his wife Queen Tiye, Egyptian Museum, Cairo

Her husband devoted a number of shrines to her and constructed a temple dedicated to her in Sedeinga in Nubia Portal where she was worshipped as a form of the goddess Hathor-Tefnut. He also had an artificial lake built for her in his Year 12. On the colossal statue now in the Egyptian Museum she is of equal height with her husband. As the American Egyptologists David O'Connor and Eric Cline note:

The unprecedented thing about Tiyi. ... is not where she came from but what she became. No previous queen ever figured so prominently in her husband's lifetime. Tiyi regularly appeared besides Amenhotep III in statuary, tomb and temple reliefs, and stelae while her name is paired with his on numerous small objects, such as vessels and jewelry, not to mention the large commemorative scarabs, where her name regularly follows his in the dateline. New elements in her portraiture, such as the addition of cows' horns and sun disks—attributes of the goddess Hathor—to her headdress, and her representation in the form of a sphinx—an image formerly reserved for the king—emphasize her role as the king's divine, as well as earthly partner. Amenhotep III built a temple to her in Sedeinga in northern Sudan, where she was worshiped as a form of Hathor ... The temple at Sedeinga was the pendant to Amenhotep III's own, larger temple at Soleb, fifteen kilometres to the south (an arrangement followed a century later by Ramses II at Abu Simbel, where there are likewise two temples, the larger southern temple dedicated to the king, and the smaller, northern temple dedicated to the queen, Nefertiry, as Hathor).

== Influence at court ==
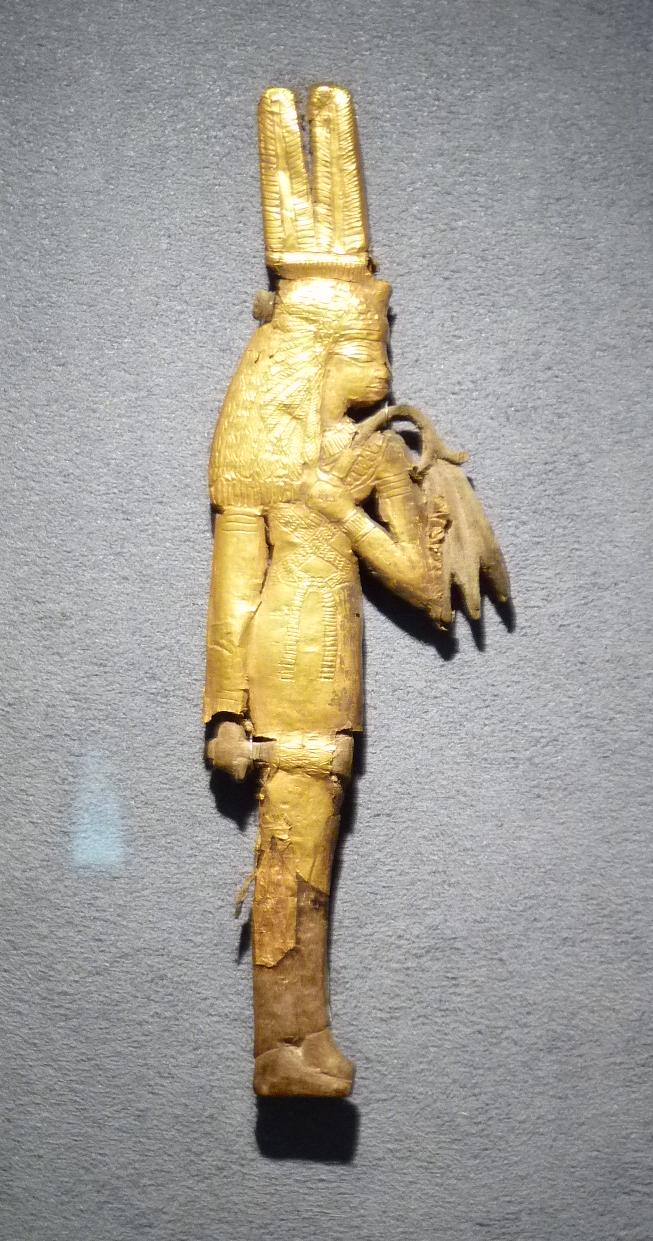
Tiye shrine

Tiye wielded a great deal of power during both her husband's and son's reigns. Amenhotep III became a fine sportsman, a lover of outdoor life, and a great statesman. He often had to consider claims for Egypt's gold and requests for his royal daughters in marriage from foreign kings such as Tushratta of Mitanni and Kadashman-Enlil I of Babylon. Tiye became her husband's trusted adviser and confidant. Known for her intelligence and strong personality, she was able to gain the respect of foreign dignitaries. Foreign leaders were willing to deal directly with her. She continued to play an active role in foreign relations and was the first Egyptian queen to have her name recorded on official acts.

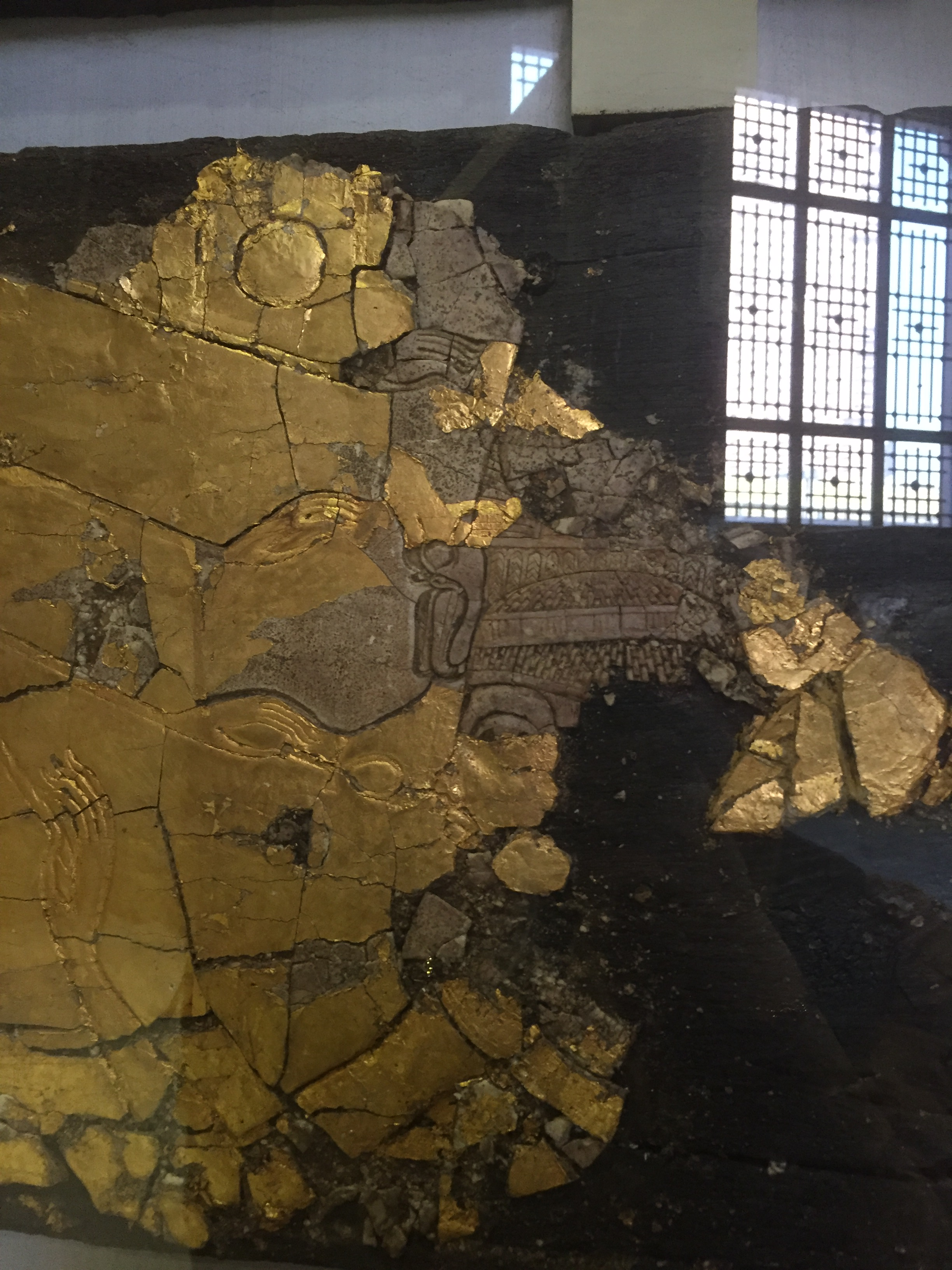
Portion of gilded shrine panel from KV55. It depicts Queen Tiye sprinkling incense on offerings before the rays of the Aten

Tiye may have continued to advise her son, Amenhotep IV, when he took the throne. Her son’s correspondence with Tushratta, the king of Mitanni, speaks highly of the political influence she wielded at court. In Amarna letter EA 26, Tushratta, corresponded directly with Tiye to reminisce about the good relations he enjoyed with her then deceased husband and extended his wish to continue on friendly terms with her son, Akhenaten.

Amenhotep III died in Year 38 or Year 39 of his reign around 1353 BC and was buried in the Valley of the Kings in WV22. Tiye continued to be mentioned in the Amarna letters and in inscriptions as queen and beloved of the king. Amarna letter EA 26, which is addressed to Tiye, dates to the reign of Amenhotep IV. She is known to have had a house at Akhetaten (Amarna), Amenhotep IV's new capital and is shown on the walls of the tomb of Huya – a "steward in the house of the king's mother, the great royal wife Tiyi" – depicted at a dinner table with Amenhotep IV, Nefertiti, and their family and then being escorted by the king to her sunshade. In an inscription approximately dated to November 21 of Year 12 of Akhenaten's reign (1338 BC), both she and her granddaughter Meketaten are mentioned for the last time. They are thought to have died shortly after that date. This information is corroborated by the fact that the shrine which Amenhotep IV created for her—which was later found transported from Amarna to tomb KV55 in Thebes—bore the later form of the Aten's name which was only used after Akhenaten's Year 9.

If Tiye died soon after Year 12 of Akhenaten's reign (1338 BC), this would place her birth around 1398 BC, her marriage to Amenhotep III at the age of 11 or 12, and her becoming a widow at the age of 48 or 49. Suggestions of a co-regency between Amenhotep III and his son Amenhotep IV lasting for up to 12 years continue, but most scholars today either accept a brief co-regency lasting no more than one year or no co-regency at all.

== Burial and mummy ==
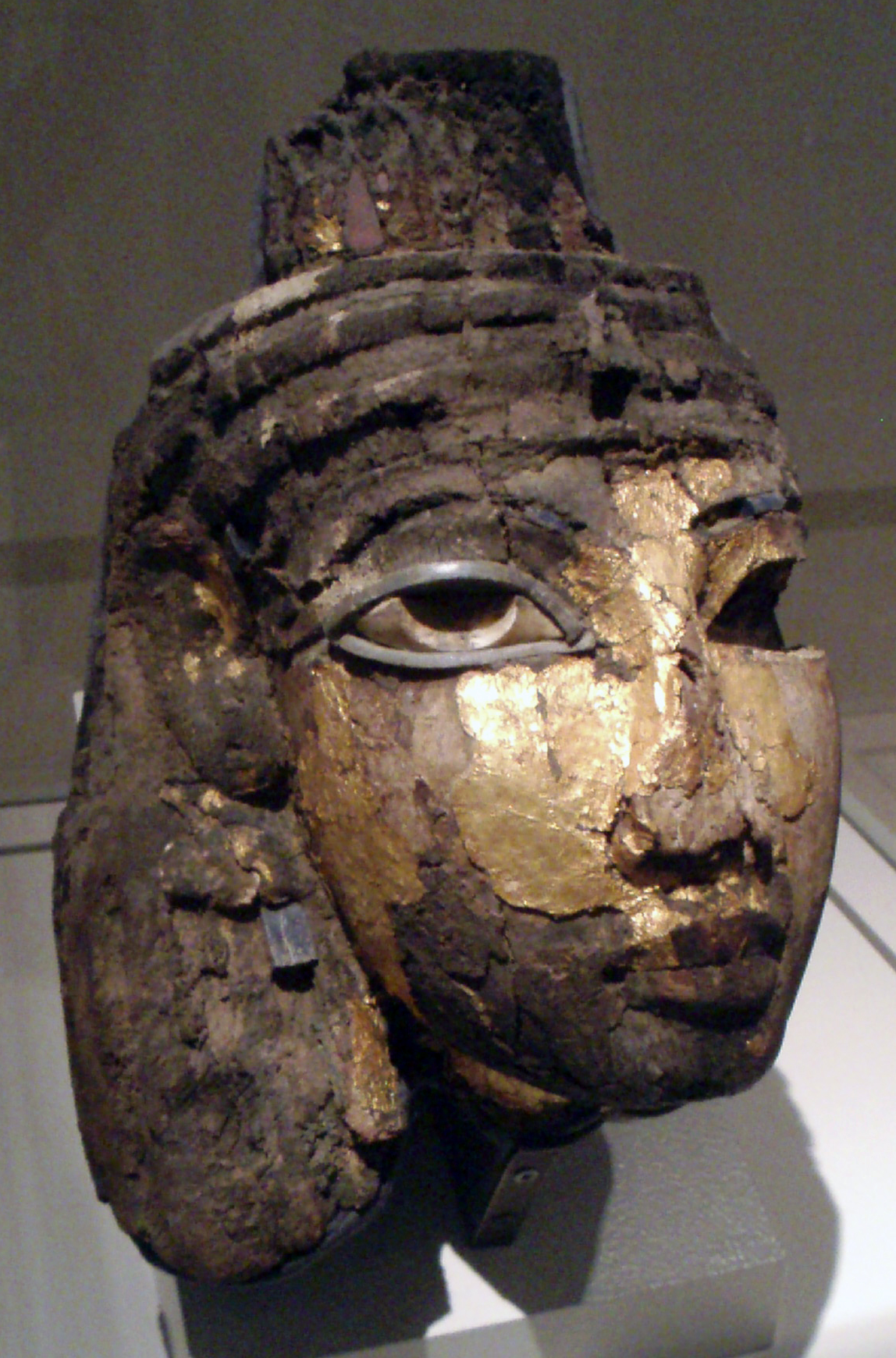
Fragmentary funerary mask of Queen Tiye from KV35 in the Egyptian Museum of Berlin

Tiye is believed to have been originally buried in the Royal Tomb at Amarna alongside her son Amenhotep IV and granddaughter, Meketaten. Evidence shows the two northern pillars of the incomplete pillared hall were removed to accommodate a sarcophagus plinth and pieces of her smashed sarcophagus were found in and around the burial chamber. Analysis of the badly damaged decoration on the left wall beyond the plinth also indicates that Tiye was buried there. In a depiction that closely resembles the mourning of Meketaten in chamber γ, a figure stands beneath a floral canopy while the royal family grieves. The figure wears a queenly sash but cannot be Nefertiti because she is shown with the mourners. Therefore, the figure in the canopy is most likely to be Tiye. Tiye's sarcophagus was likely contained within multiple nested shrines, like those of her grandson Tutankhamun. The inscription on a portion of such a shrine found in KV55 indicates that Amenhotep IV had the shrines made for his mother.

Following the move of the capital back to Thebes, Tiye, along with others buried in the royal tomb, were transferred to the Valley of the Kings. The presence of pieces of one of her gilded burial shrines in KV55 indicate she was likely interred there for a time. Provisions had been made during the reign of her husband Amenhotep III for her burial within his tomb, WV22. Shabti figures belonging to her were found in this tomb. However, the fact that Tiye outlived her husband by possibly as much as 15 years seems to have disrupted such plans.

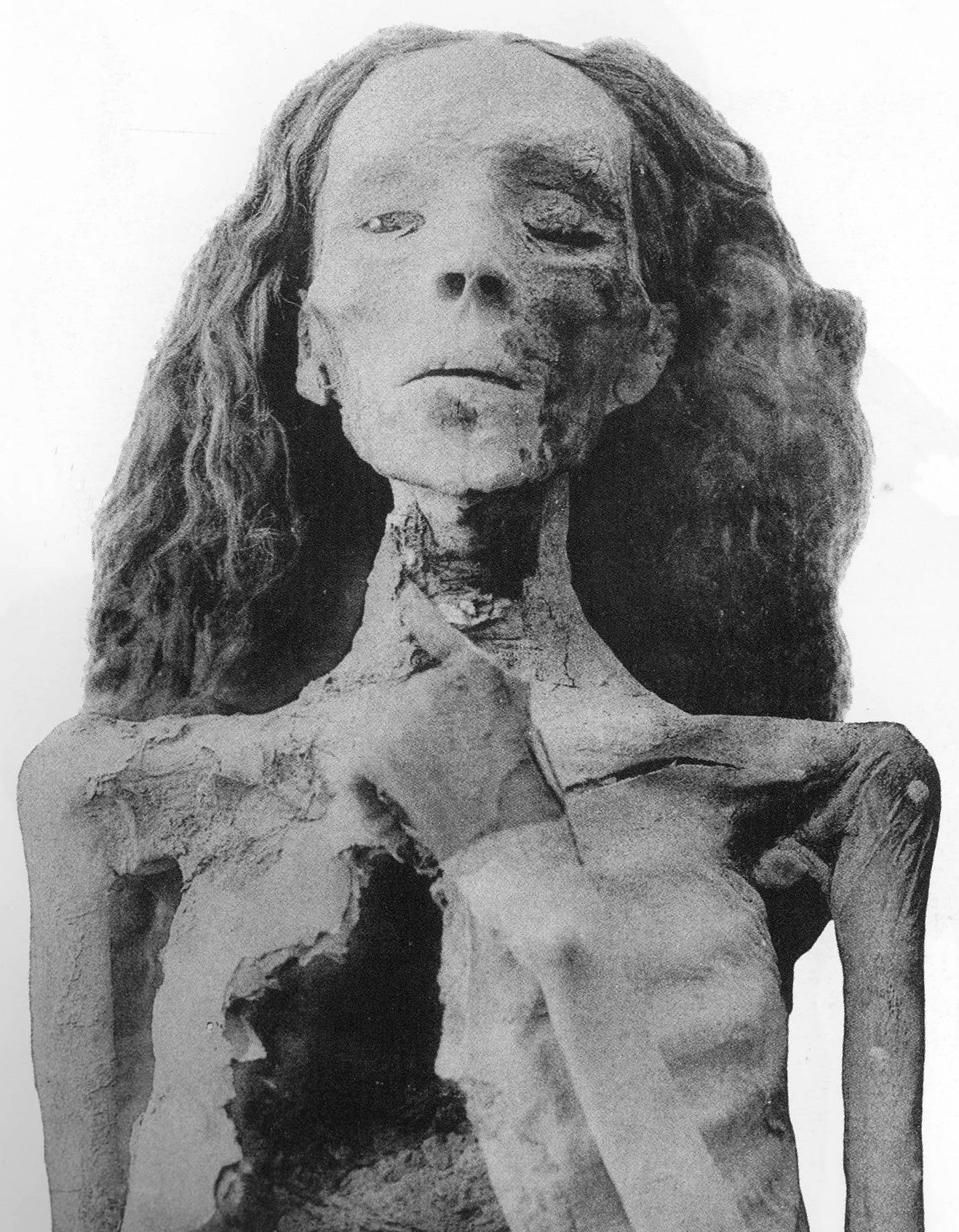
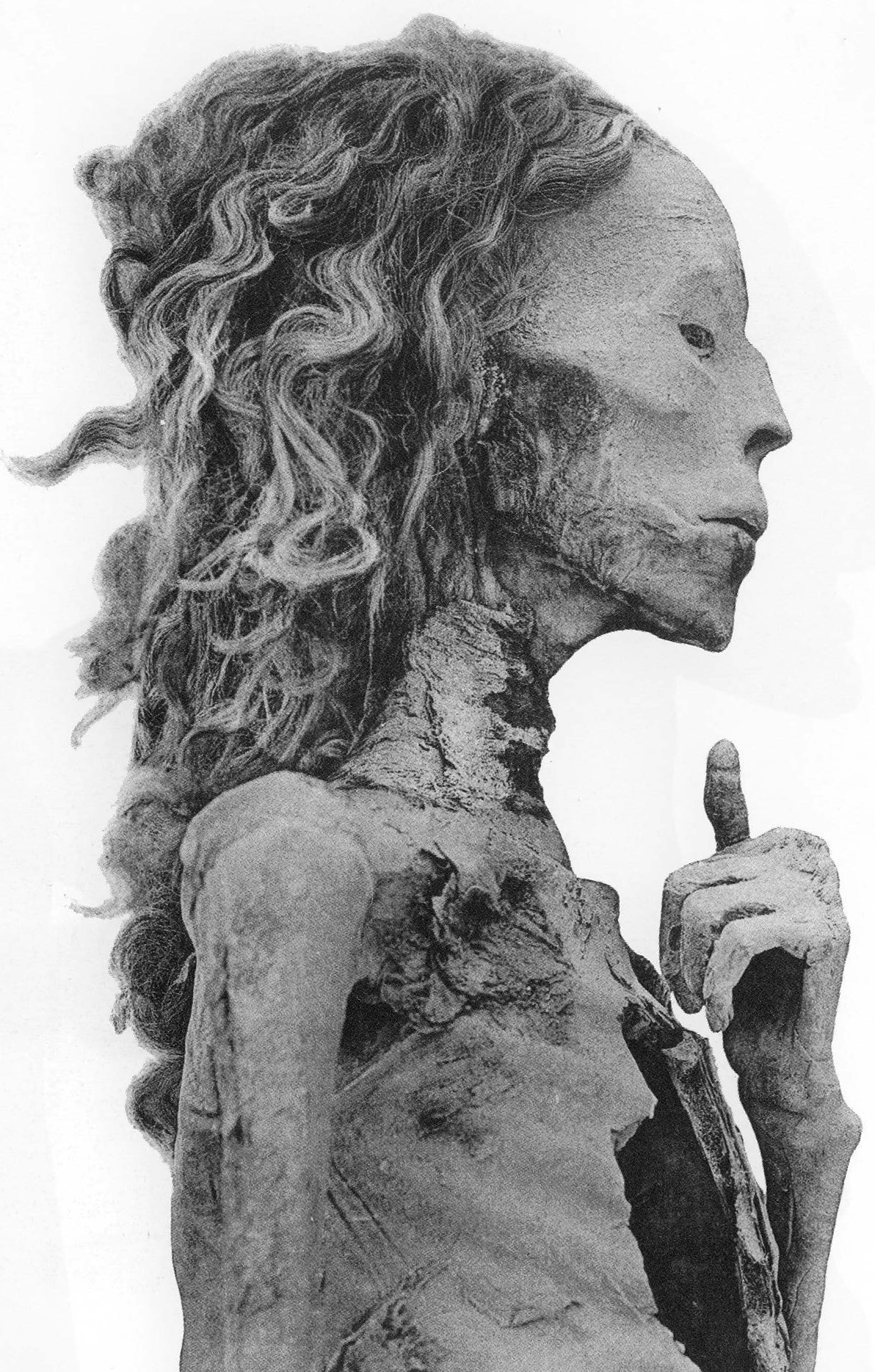
The mummy of Queen Tiye, front and side view, taken in 1912, back when it was still known as the Elder Lady. Damage to the chest of the mummy, made by tomb robbers, is visible.

In 1898, three sets of mummified remains were found in a side chamber of the tomb of Amenhotep II in KV35 by Victor Loret. One was an older woman and the other two were a young boy who died around the age of 10, thought to be Webensenu or Prince Thutmose, and a younger, unknown woman. The three were found lying naked side-by-side and unidentified, having been unwrapped in antiquity by tomb robbers. The mummy of the older woman, who would later be identified as Tiye, was referred to by Egyptologists as the 'Elder Lady' while the other woman was 'The Younger Lady'. Several researchers argued that the Elder Lady was Queen Tiye. There were other scholars who were skeptical of this theory, such as British scholars Aidan Dodson and Dyan Hilton, who once stated that "it seems very unlikely that her mummy could be the so-called 'Elder Lady' in the tomb of Amenhotep II."

University of Michigan Professor James Harris and team x-rayed the mummies of Yuya and Thuya who were known to have been the parents to Tiye. When uploading the scans to a computer it was discovered that the profiles matched that of the Elder Lady. Based on the position of the Elder Lady's left arm, Egyptologist Edward Wente suspected it was a woman of royalty. Her hand was closed in a fist and positioned over her chest as if she had been holding a scepter.

A nest of four miniature coffins inscribed with her name and containing a lock of hair was found in the tomb of her grandson Tutankhamun – perhaps a memento from a beloved grandmother. In 1976, microprobe analysis conducted on hair samples from the Elder Lady and the lock from the inscribed coffins found the two were a near perfect match, thereby identifying the Elder Lady as Tiye.

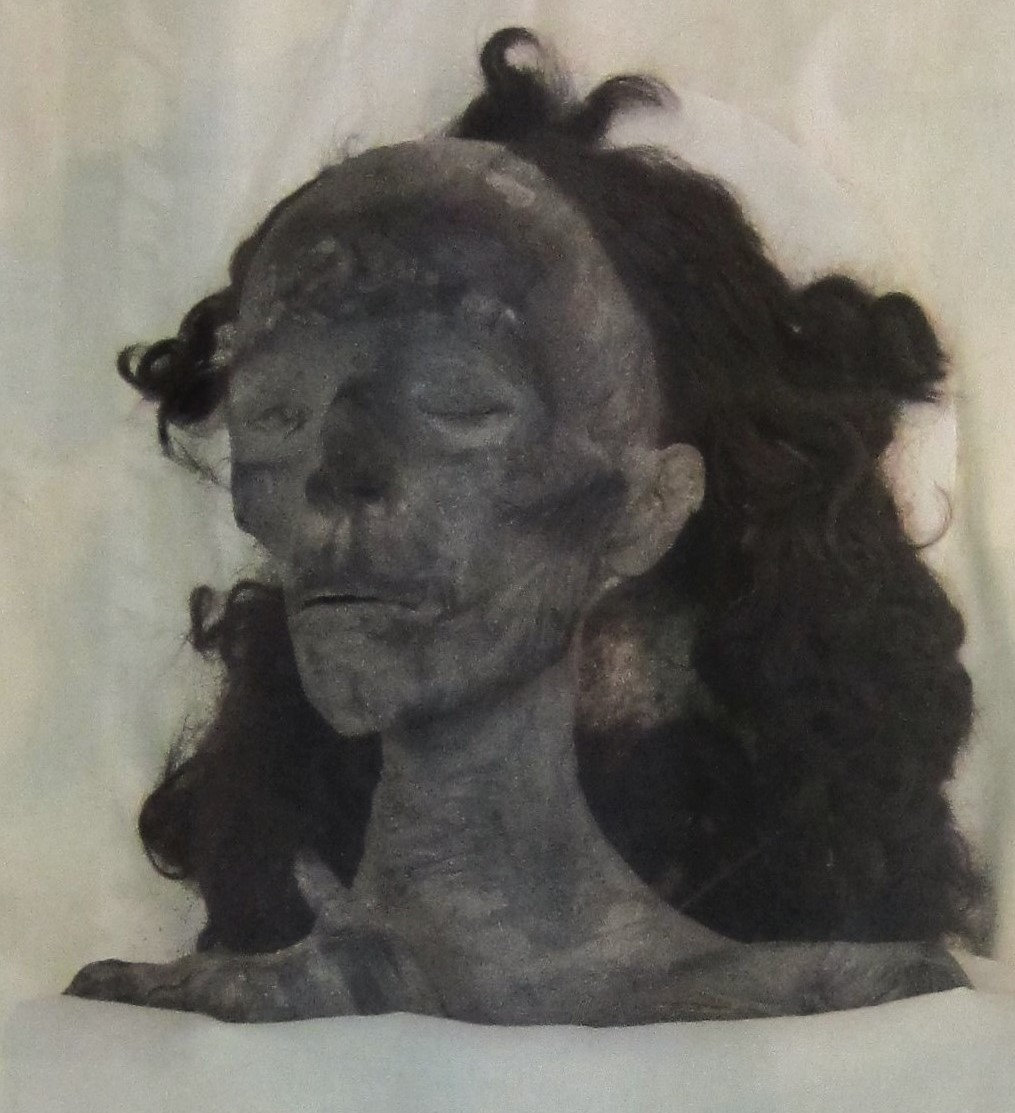
The Mummy of Queen Tiye, now at the National Museum of Egyptian Civilization in Cairo, 2015

By 2010, DNA analysis, sponsored by the Secretary General of the Egyptian Supreme Council of Antiquities Zahi Hawass, was able to formally identify the Elder Lady as Queen Tiye. She was found to be about 40–50 years old at the time of her death, and 145 cm (4 ft 9 in) tall. DNA results published in 2020 revealed that Tiye had the mtDNA haplogroup K (as did her mother, Thuya). Tiye's father Yuya was found to have the Y-DNA haplogroup G2a and mtDNA haplogroup K.

Her mummy has the inventory number CG 61070. In April 2021 her mummy was moved from the Museum of Egyptian Antiquities to National Museum of Egyptian Civilization along with those of three other queens and 18 kings in an event termed the Pharaohs' Golden Parade.

== Gallery ==
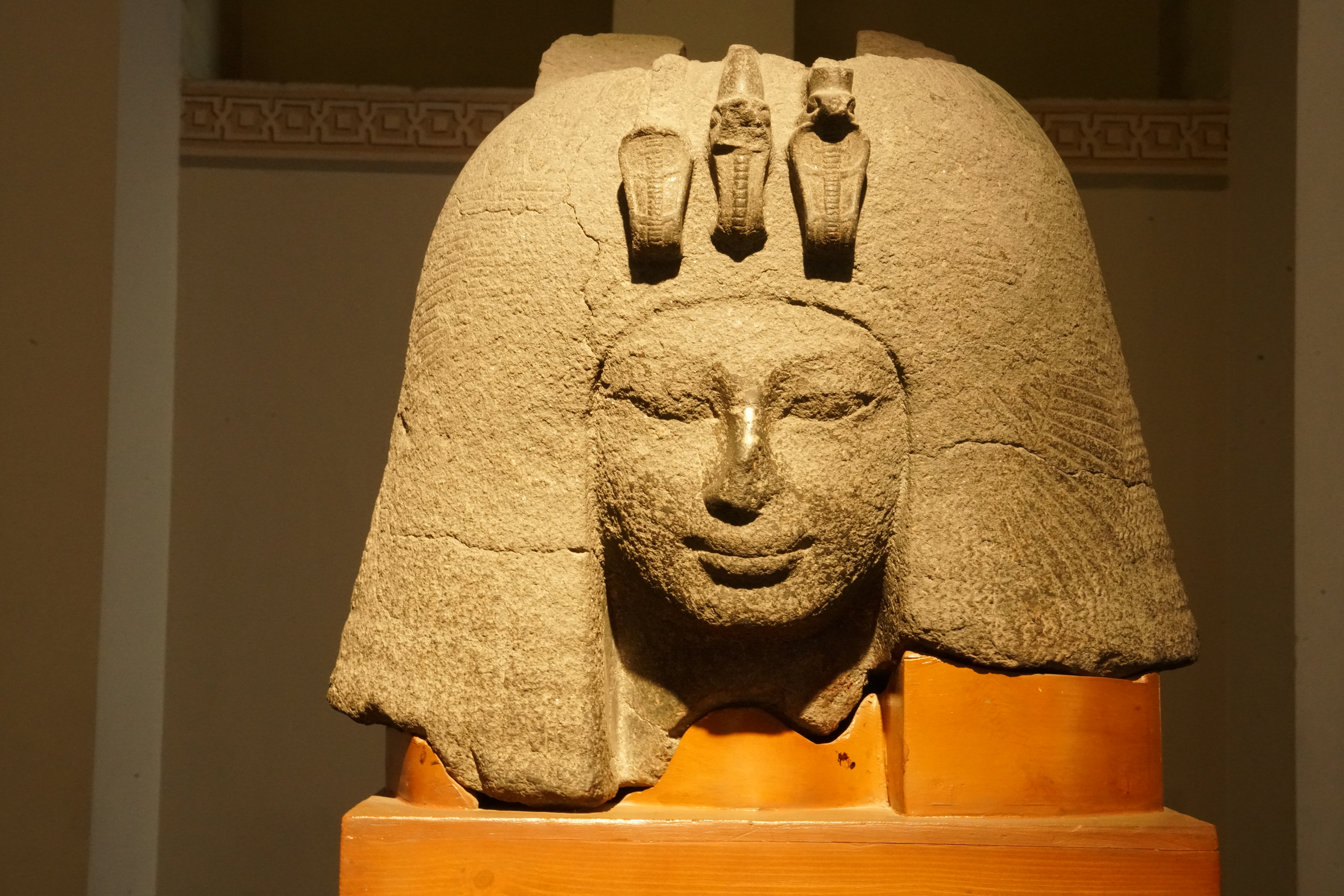
Granite Head of Queen Tiye at the Egyptian Museum

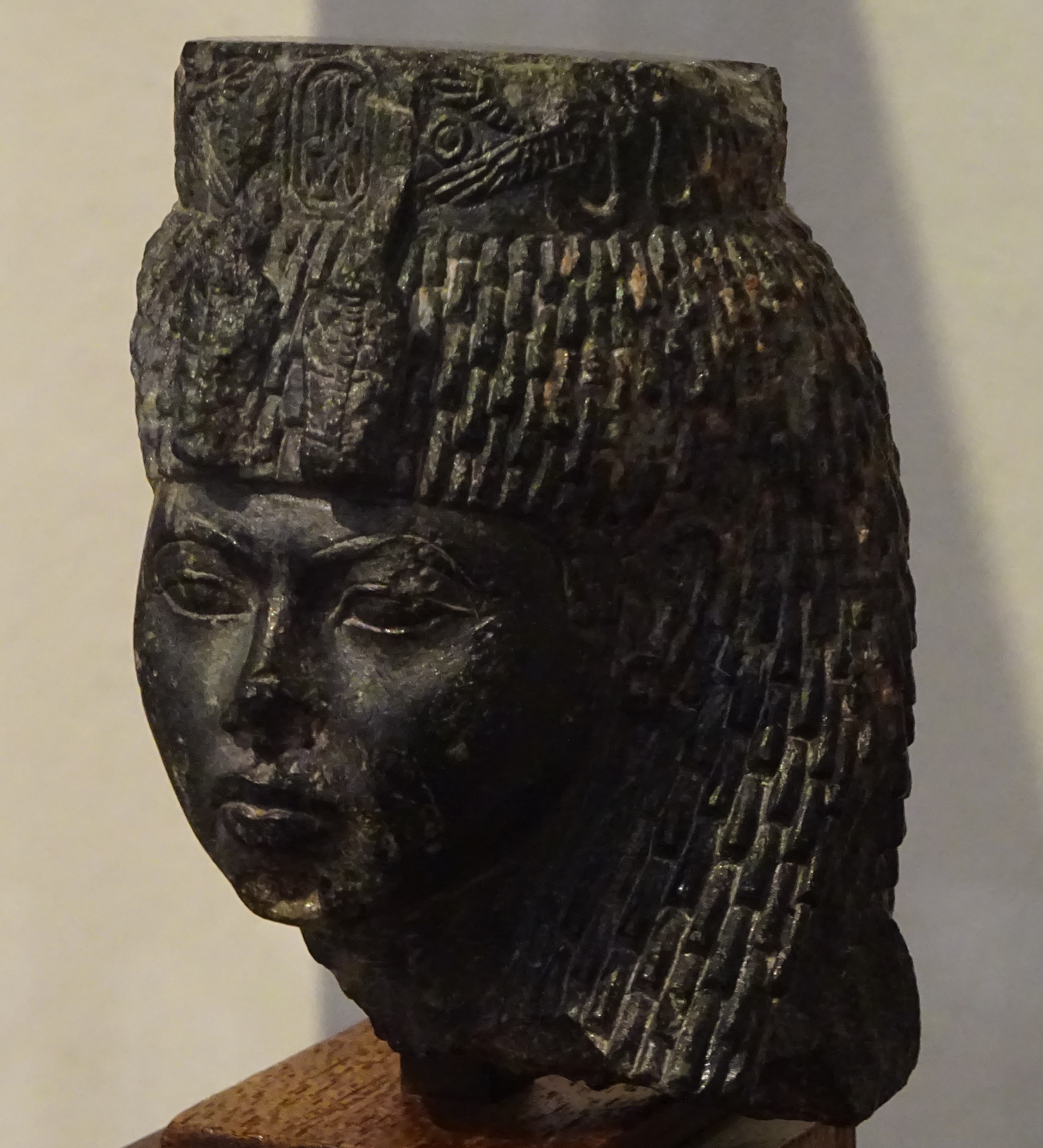
Bust of Tiye

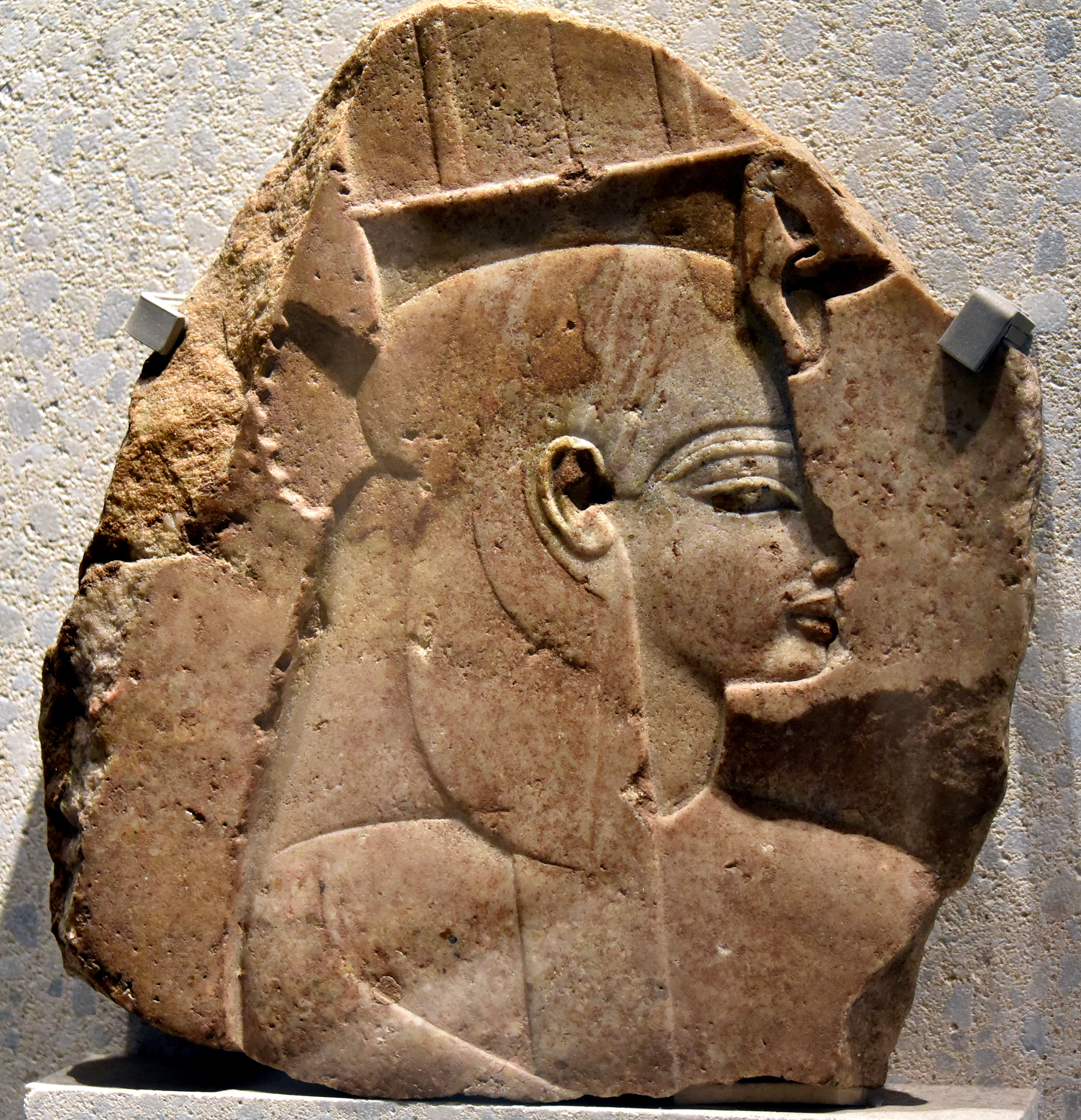
Relief of Queen Tiye, wearing the vulture headdress and uraeus. From the mortuary temple of Amenhotep III at Western Thebes, Egypt, c. 1375 BC. Neues Museum.

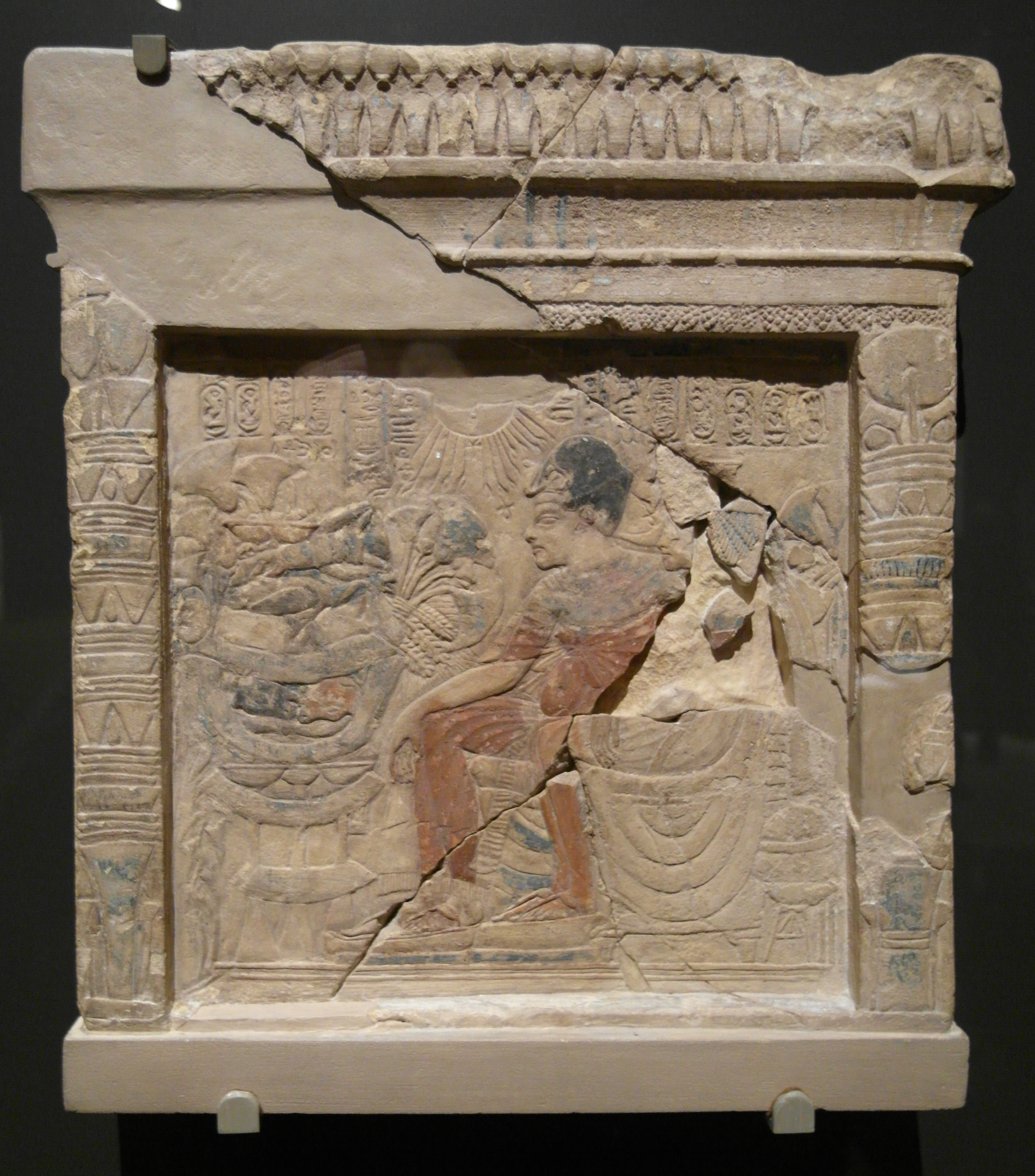
Amenhotep III and Queen Tiye

== Books ==
- Bayer, Christian (2014). Die den Herrn beider Länder mit ihrer Schönheit erfreut. Teje: eine ikonographische Studie [She who delights the Lord of the two lands with her beauty. Teje: an iconographic study]. Ruhpolding: Rutzen. ISBN 978-3-447-06952-6.
- Dodson, Aidan; Hilton, Dyan (2004). The Complete Royal Families of Ancient Egypt. London: Thames & Hudson. ISBN 978-0-500-05128-3.
- O'Connor, David; Cline, Eric H. (1998). Amenhotep III: Perspectives on His Reign. Ann Arbor: University of Michigan Press. ISBN 978-0-472-08833-1. Archived from the original on 2021-06-16.
- Tyldesley, Joyce (2006). Chronicle of the Queens of Egypt. London: Thames & Hudson. ISBN 978-0-500-05145-0.
