= Sitamun =

i mn n G39 t
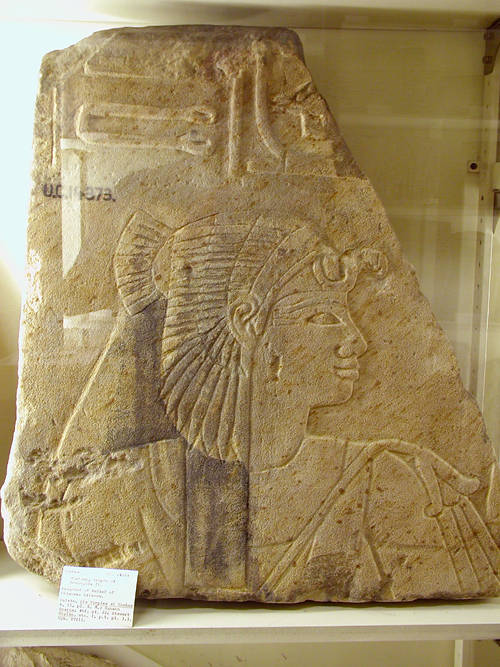
- A relief from Amenhotep II's mortuary temple adapted for Sitamun, on display at the Petrie Museum, London (UC 14373)

Queen consort of Egypt
- Tenure: c. 1360 BC
- Pharaoh: Amenhotep III
- Born: c. 1375 BC
- Died: c. 1350 BC (aged c. 25)
- Spouse: Amenhotep III
- Father: Amenhotep III
- Mother: Tiye
- Religion: Ancient Egyptian religion

Sitamun, also Sitamen, Satamun; Ancient Egyptian: sꜣ.t-imn, "daughter of Amun"; (c. 1375 BC - c. 1350 BC) was an ancient Egyptian princess and queen consort during the 18th Dynasty.

== Family ==
Sitamun is considered to be the eldest daughter of Pharaoh Amenhotep III and his Great Royal Wife Tiye. She was later married to her father around Year 30 of Amenhotep III's reign.

The belief that Sitamun was a daughter of Amenhotep III and Tiye is based on the presence of objects found in the tomb of Yuya and Thuya, Queen Tiye's parents, especially a chair bearing her title as the king's daughter.

== Biography ==
Sitamun is very well attested, most notably in the tomb of Yuya and Thuya where three finely made chairs were discovered. As these chairs were used, and are of progressively larger size, it is assumed they belonged to Sitamun as she was growing up. They were then placed in her grandparents' tomb in the tradition of placing objects which had meaning in the deceased person's life. She is also depicted on the stele of her nurse Nebetkabeny.

Almost nothing is known of her life beyond being the oldest daughter of a powerful (and long-lived) queen. In the last decade of her father's reign, she was promoted to the status of Great Royal Wife. The evidence for this marriage consists of a blue-faience kohl-tube with the cartouches of Amenhotep III and Sitamun, an alabaster bowl found at Amarna with the same cartouches, and jar-label inscriptions from Malkata palace. Sitamun's elevation to her role as Great Royal Wife of her father, Amenhotep III, is attested as early as Year 30 of his reign from jar label inscription No.95 which was discovered in the royal palace.

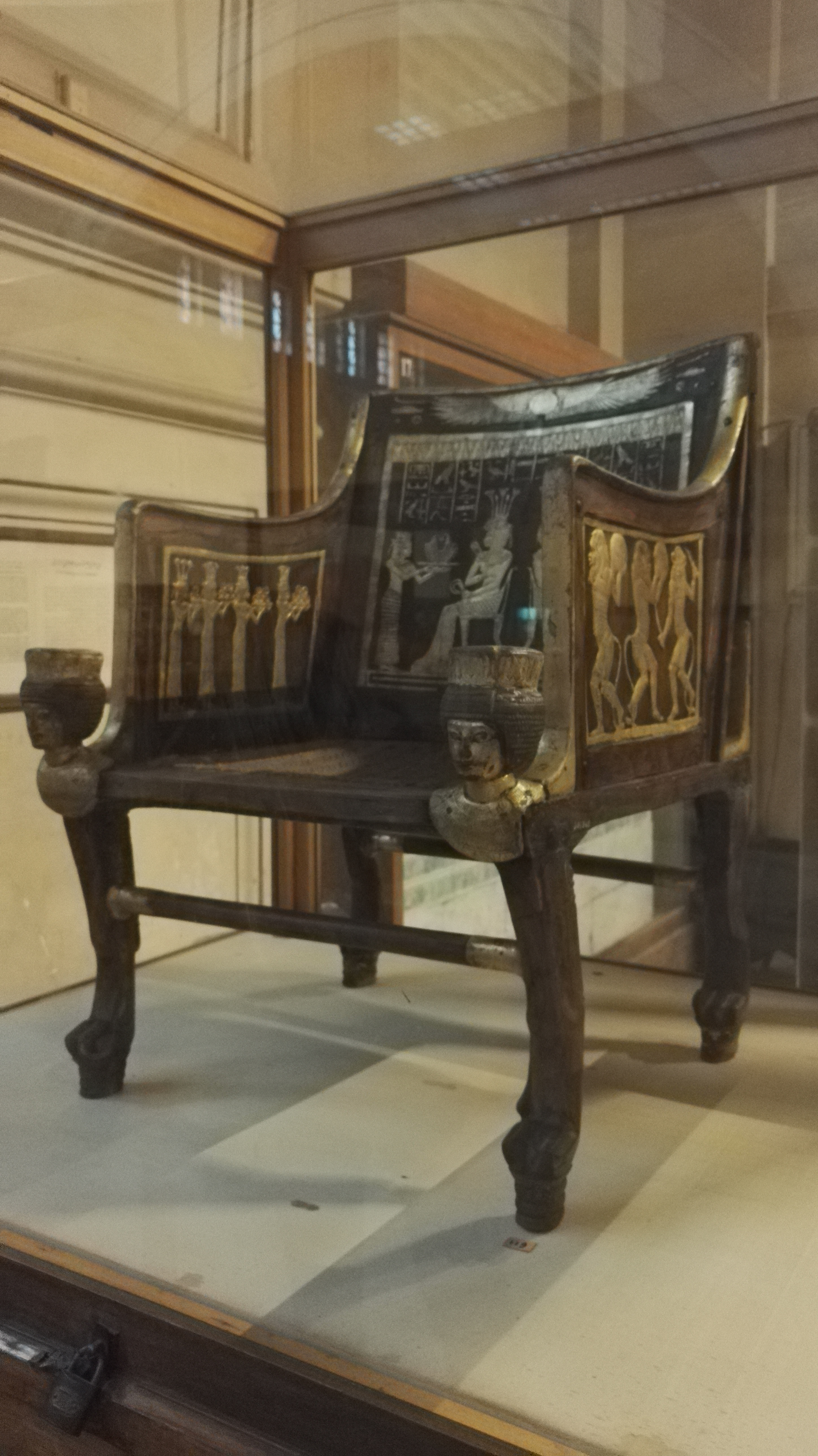
Sitamun's throne, from the tomb of Yuya and Tjuyu

She maintained her own rooms in the Malkata palace complex, and Amenhotep was appointed as the steward of her properties here. She is attested on a Karnak statue of Amenhotep, son of Hapu (now in the Egyptian Museum, Cairo) where she is mentioned as the king's Great Royal Wife. She also appears on a relief from Amenhotep III's mortuary temple, found by William Petrie, (now in the Petrie Museum). Sitamun is among a handful of figures that appear near the end of the reign of Amenhotep III. This was an era of Egyptian history in which women assumed far more prominent and powerful roles with Amenhotep III's wife Tiye, Sitamun's mother, being a particular example. Prior to Tiye's reign, "no previous queen ever figured so prominently in her husband's lifetime". Tiye regularly appeared besides Amenhotep III in statuary, tomb and temple reliefs and stelae, while her name is paired with his on numerous small objects, such as vessels and jewellery, as well as their large commemorative scarabs.

As the eldest daughter of a powerful queen, Sitamun would have been groomed for a political role but never fulfilled this potential, despite having her own property at Malkata and her high position at court. One possibility is that she was married to an heir who never assumed the throne. Another possibility is that she died prematurely or went into seclusion after her brother Amenhotep IV became king. She was an aunt of Tutankhamun.

She vanishes at the end of Amenhotep III's reign and is not mentioned during Amenhotep IV's reign. A separate chamber was carved for her in Amenhotep III's tomb in the Valley of the Kings, but there is no evidence that she was ever buried there.

== Titles ==
- Singer of the Lord of the Two Lands
- King’s Wife
- King’s Great Wife
- King’s Daughter
- King’s Daughter Whom He Loves
- Eldest Daughter of the King
- Great Daughter of the King Whom He Loves
