= 1999 in archaeology =

The year 1999 in archaeology involved some significant events.

== Excavations ==
- Excavations resume at Qatna, in Syria, by the Deutsche Orient-Gesellschaft.
- Osiris Shaft in the Giza pyramid complex of Egypt, by Zahi Hawass.
- Wide-scope vertical and horizontal excavation of world's oldest wet-rice (rice paddy) agricultural feature, c. 800 BC, at Okhyeon site, Ulsan, Korea.
- Excavation at Tal-i Malyan in Anshan (Iran).
- Excavations at Hyde Abbey, Winchester, England.
- Excavations begin at Tursiannotko in Pirkkala, Finland.
- September – First season of excavations at the Bronze Age Tell es-Sakan in Palestine, jointly led by Pierre de Miroschedji and Moain Sadeq.
- September – First season of excavations at the Bronze Age Tell el-Ajjul in Palestine jointly led by Peter M. Fischer and Moain Sadeq. The site was last excavated in the 1930s.

== Exploration ==
- Start of Scotland's First Settlers project in Inner Sound of Hebrides.

== Finds ==
- March 16 – Mummified Children of Llullaillaco found on the volcanic peak of Llullaillaco in South America.
- May 24–28 – Wreck of Israeli submarine INS Dakar (sunk 1968) located in eastern Mediterranean Sea.
- July 16 – Spillings Hoard of silver found on Gotland.
- July 20 – The Mercury-Redstone 4 capsule Liberty Bell 7 (1961) is recovered from the Atlantic Ocean.
- July 22 – A frozen and mummified body, later named Kwäday Dän Ts’ìnchi ("Long Ago Person Found"), is found in a Canadian glacier.
- Nebra sky disk found by illegal metal detectorists in Saxony-Anhalt; if its Bronze Age dating is accurate, it is the oldest physical depiction of the cosmos known from anywhere in the world.
- Shipwreck, originally thought to be RMS Carpathia, but later identified as Hamburg-America Line's Isis (sunk 1936), located in eastern Atlantic Ocean.
- Wreck of British submarine HMS M1 (sunk 1925) in the English Channel.
- Shipwreck thought to be William Kidd's pirate ship Adventure Galley (scuttled 1698) located off Madagascar by Barry Clifford.
- Marausa wreck (Roman) located off Sicily.
- 105 mummies are discovered in the first four tombs to be opened in the Valley of the Golden Mummies in Egypt.
- John and Deborah Darnell of the Theban Desert Road Survey announce discovery of inscriptions from around 1800 BCE at Wadi el-Hol, Egypt, in a partly phonetic Proto-Sinaitic alphabet.
- Venus of Tan-Tan (300,000–500,000 BP) found in Morocco.
- Ġebel ġol-Baħar, possibly a submerged megalithic temple, is discovered off the coast of Malta.
- Submerged ruins of Heracleion in Egypt are located and explored by French underwater archaeologist Franck Goddio after a 5-year search.
- Site of Must Farm Bronze Age settlement in The Fens of eastern England first located.
- Croatian Apoxyomenos raised from the sea.
- Discovery of Wezmeh Cave in Iran

== Publications ==
- Penelope M. Allison (ed.) – The Archaeology of Household Activities.
- Victor Buchli – An Archaeology of Socialism.
- John Carman and Anthony Harding (ed.) – Ancient Warfare: archaeological perspectives.
- Chris Gosden and Jon Hather (ed.) – The Prehistory of Food: appetites for change.
- Matthew Johnson – Archaeological Theory: an introduction.
- Thomas Stöllner – Der prähistorische Salzbergbau am Dürrnberg bei Hallein: Forschungsgeschichte, Forschungsstand, Forschungsanliegen, Bd 1.
- July–August issue of Archaeology asks: "Is Schliemann Mask a Fake?". Some scholars, noting that the "Mask of Agamemnon" is significantly different from the others found at the site, contend that Schliemann had some of the features added to make the mask appear more heroic to viewers of his day.

== Deaths ==
- March 31 – Yuri Knorozov, Russian epigrapher of Maya hieroglyphs (born 1922)
- May 30 – Sonia Chadwick Hawkes, English early medieval archaeologist (born 1933)
- June 14 – Arvid Andrén, Swedish scholar of classical terracotta (born 1902)
- July 16 – Barri Jones, British Roman archaeologist (born 1936)
