= Arthur Hjelt =

Finnish theologian (1868–1931)

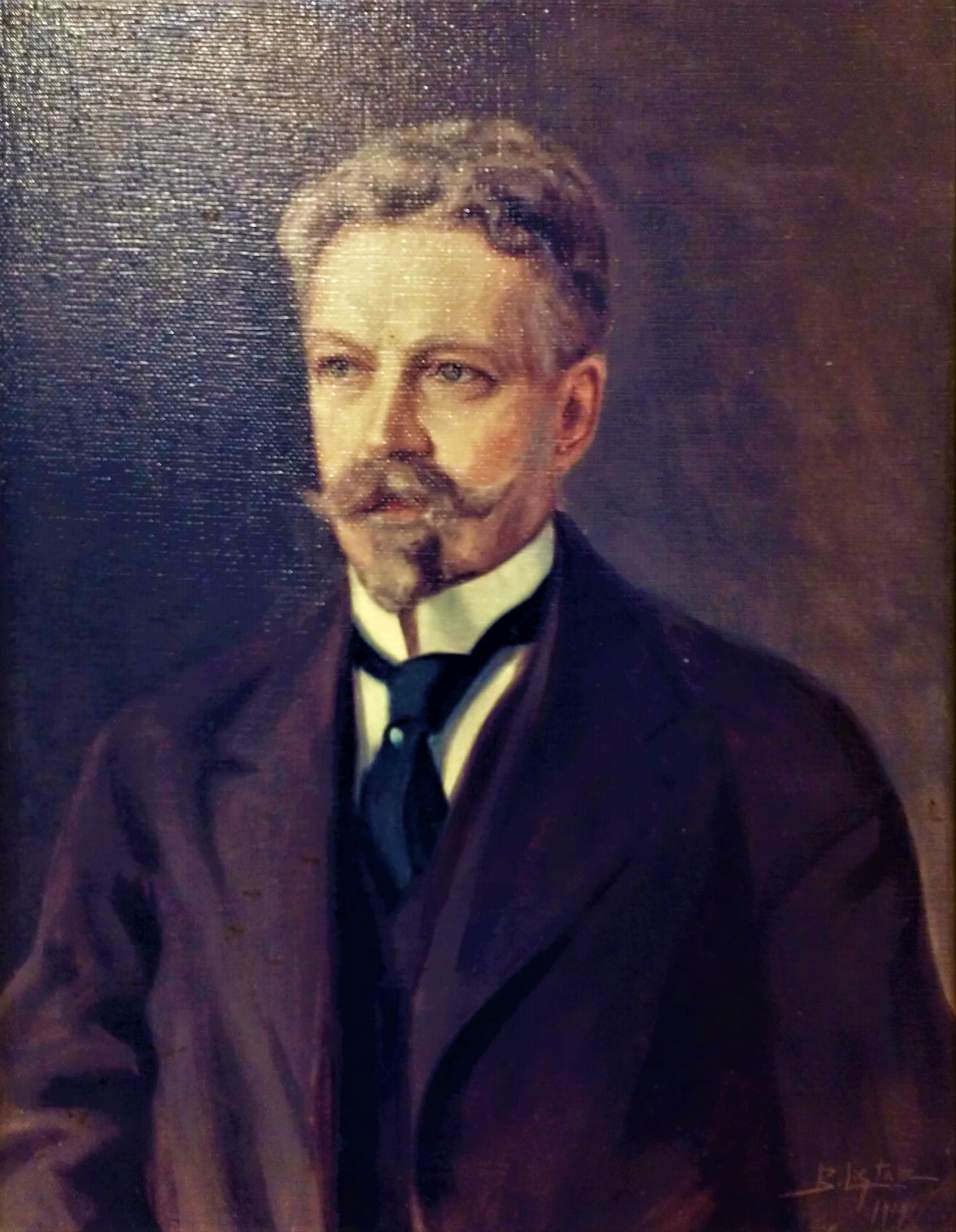
Arthur Hjelt in 1919

Arthur Ludvig Mikael Hjelt (October 18, 1868 Helsinki – March 13, 1931 Helsinki) was a Finnish theologian, professor, member of parliament and writer.

== Biography ==
Hjelt's parents were architect Otto Edvard August Hjelt and Yolanda Aurora Thuneberg. His brothers were statistician and senator August Hjelt, chemist Edvard Hjelt and bank manager Otto Hjelt. He matriculated in 1886 and graduated with a bachelor's and master's degree in philosophy in 1890, a licentiate in philosophy in 1892, a doctorate in philosophy in 1894, a bachelor's degree in theology in 1896, a licentiate in theology in 1901 and a doctorate in theology in 1907. Hjelt made a research trip to Palestine and the Sinai Peninsula in 1911.

Hjelt was head of the Early Languages of the Bible at the University of Helsinki, as an assistant in 1892–1893 and 1896–1899 and as an assistant in 1903–1904. He was acting director of Old Testament Exegesis, professor 1901–1904 and professor 1904–1926 and professor of New Testament Exegesis 1926–1931. In addition, he was amanuensis of the university's money cabinet 1892–1904 and supervisor 1904–1931, and manager of Antelli's money collection 1895–1899. Hjelt served as the curator of the Western Finnish branch 1894–1896, the inspector of the Southern Northern branch 1908–1912, and the inspector of the Varsinaisfinmallen branch 1929–1931. Hjelt became an honorary doctor of theology at Lund University in 1918.

Hjelt participated in the Diet in 1905 as a priest. He was a member of the Bible Translation Committee from 1908 to 1927 and chairman of the committee from 1927 to 1931. In addition, Hjelt served as the chairman of Helsinki NMKY 1895–1898 and 1904, the Finnish representative of the Finnish Youth Christian Union in the NMKY world committee 1902–1931, a member of the Nordic committee of the Christian student movement 1899–1902, the chairman of the Finnish Christian Student Union 1916–1922 and the Finnish member of the Nordic Churches Cooperation Committee 1917 -1931.

In the fall of 1928, Hjelt was part of an expedition that went to study the Syriac gospel manuscript from Syrus Sinaiticus kept in the monastery of St. Catherine in the Sinai. In addition to him, the expedition included professor Johannes Lindblom of Åbo Akademi, university photographer F. Jonasson and bank manager E. Laurell from Helsinki as the expedition's steward. Dr. Aapeli Saarisalo joined the expedition in Egypt. The expedition stayed in the monastery for 10 days and during that time they were able to photograph 361 pages of the gospel codex. The second research target was the ancient Semitic hieroglyphs located in the old mining area of Serâbit el-Khâdem of the pharaohs.

Arthur Hjelt's son was the ambassador Lauri Hjelt.

== Works ==
- Wilhelm Ross : suomalainen orientalisti ja matkustaja viime vuosisadalla. Länsisuomalainen osakunta, Helsinki 1890
- Piirteitä apostolikum-riidasta Saksassa. Otava 1894
- Die altsyrische Evangelienübersetzung und Tatians Diatessaron, besonders in ihrem gegenseitigen Verhältnis untersucht, Helsingin yliopiston väitöskirja. Leipzig 1901
- De Johanneiska småbrefvens ursprung undersökt med särskild hänsyn till presbyter-hypotesen, Helsingin yliopiston väitöskirja. Helsingfors 1901
- Konung Hammurabis lagar och Israels Thora : ett bidrag till "Babel-Bibel"-frågan. Helsingfors 1903
- Israelin vanhin historia muinaistieteen valossa: virkaan asettajaisesitelmä. Yrjö Weilin, Helsinki 1904
- Messianische Begriffe und Ausdrücke in den Psalmen untersucht : Heft. 1, Die Königsherrschaft Gottes : Das Gericht. Leipzig 1904
- Pääpiirteet Babylonian ja Assyrian historiasta: raamatun kertomuksia silmällä pitäen. Kansanvalistus-seuran toimituksia 134. Helsinki 1905
- Lähetysaate vanhassa testamentissa. WSOY 1909
- Mikael Agricola Uuden testamentin kääntäjänä: juhlaesitelmä Suomen kirkkohistoriallisen seuran vuosikokouksessa 19 p. tammik. 1908. Suomen kirkkohistoriallinen seura, Jyväskylä 1909
- Raamatun synty. WSOY 1909
- Israelin kansan historia. WSOY 1913
- Matka Siinaille. Matkahavaintoja Raamatun mailta 1. Otava 1914
- Ylös Jerusalemiin. Matkahavaintoja Raamatun mailta 2. Otava 1915
- Kristinuskon vanhatestamentillinen perusta: kolme raamatullista esitelmää. WSOY 1915
- Jerusalemista Damaskoon. Matkahavaintoja Raamatun mailta 3. Otava 1917
- N. M. K. Y:n sotilastyö muualla ja meillä. WSOY 1918
- Nuori kristitty ja isänmaa. WSOY 1918
- Jumalan sanan nälkä. WSOY 1919
- Jobin kirja: vuosituhansia vanha runoelma kärsivästä ihmisestä. Otava 1923
- Nuorison ystävä: lehtori Ivar Thuneberg. WSOY 1923
- Helsingistä Siinaille. Otava 1929
- Raamatun maisemia; tekijät Arthur Hjelt, Felix Jonasson. WSOY 1929
- Syrus Sinaiticus. Helsingfors 1930

== Sources ==
- Arthur Hjelt SKS:n kirjailijamatrikkelissa
- Wikiaineisto : Kuka kukin oli 1961
- Helsingin yliopiston opettaja– ja virkamiesmatrikkeli 1640–1917, osa H-O
