= Serabit el-Khadim proto-Sinaitic inscriptions =

Series of ancient semitic inscriptions

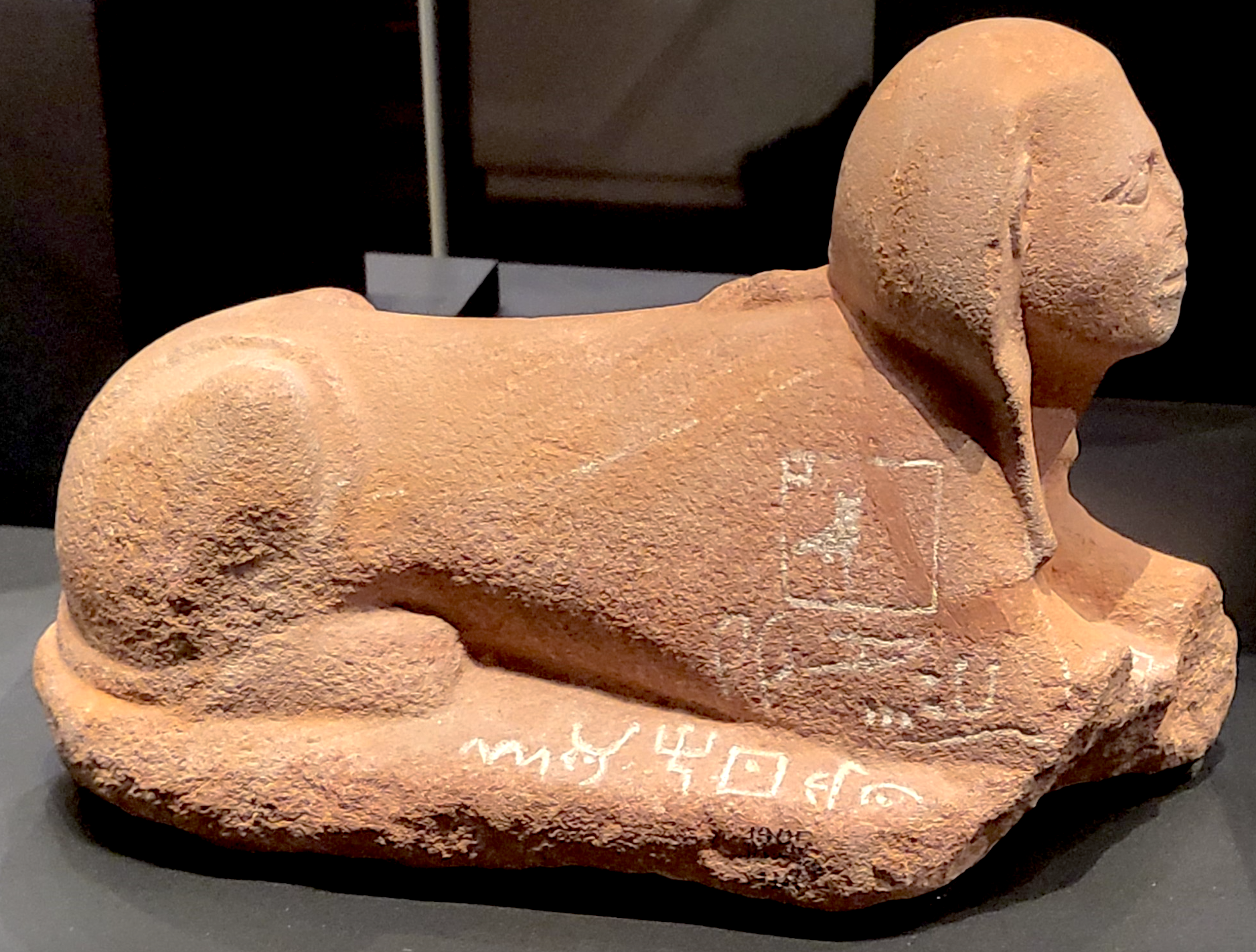
Serabit sphinx (#345)

The Serabit el-Khadim proto-Sinaitic inscriptions are about 30 early alphabetic inscriptions in proto-Sinaitic script found at or in the vicinity of Serabit el-Khadim on the Sinai Peninsula.

== Description ==
The excavations at Serabit and the non-Egyptian character of the ancient hill sanctuary supplied new material for reflection.

— Lina Eckenstein, A History of Sinai, 1921

Romanus François Butin of Catholic University of America published articles in the Harvard Theological Review based on the 1927 Harvard Mission to Serabit and the 1930 Harvard-Catholic University Joint Expedition. His article "The Serabit Inscriptions: II. The Decipherment and Significance of the Inscriptions" provides an early detailed study of the inscriptions and some dozen black and white photographs, hand-drawings and analysis of the previously published inscriptions, #346, 349, 350–354, and three new inscriptions, #355–368. At that time, #355 was still in situ at Serabit but had not been photographed by the previous Harvard Mission. In 1932, he wrote:

The present article was begun with the limited purpose of making known the new inscriptions discovered by the Harvard-Catholic University Joint Expedition to Serabit in the spring of 1930. In the course of this study, I perceived that some signs doubtful in the inscriptions already published were made clear by the new slabs, and I decided to go over the entire field again.

== Table of inscriptions ==
All the inscriptions published between 1916 and 1936 were given identification numbers following those of Gardiner's initial 1916 publication. Gardiner's numbers 1–344 were objects from Sinai with unrelated Egyptian inscriptions, so the Proto-Sinaitic inscriptions numbering began at 345. Future scholars continued this numbering scheme for ease of reference.

Name	Object	Images		Location			Discovery	
Name	Object	Sketch	Photo	Original	Current	ID	Discoverer	Publication
345	Sphinx	An inscription	An inscription	Serabit, Hathor temple	British Museum	EA41748	1906, Petrie	1916, Gardiner
346	Statuette	An inscription	An inscription	Serabit, Hathor temple	Egyptian Museum	38268	1906, Petrie	1916, Gardiner
347	Two sphinx heads	An inscription	An inscription	Serabit, Hathor temple	Art & History Museum (Brussels)	–	1906, Petrie	1916, Gardiner
348	Unknown	An inscription		Wadi Magharah	Lost	–	1868, Palmer	1904, Weill
349	Rock panel	An inscription	An inscription	Serabit, Mine L	Egyptian Museum	52511	1906, Petrie	1916, Gardiner
350	Rock panel	An inscription	An inscription	Serabit, Mine L	Egyptian Museum	51517	1906, Petrie	1916, Gardiner
351	Rock panel	An inscription	An inscription	Serabit, Mine L	Egyptian Museum	52514	1906, Petrie	1916, Gardiner
352	Rock panel	An inscription	An inscription	Serabit, Mine L	Egyptian Museum	52510	1906, Petrie	1916, Gardiner
353	Rock panel	An inscription	An inscription	Serabit, Mine L	Egyptian Museum	51513 or 52515	1906, Petrie	1916, Gardiner
354	Rock panel	An inscription	An inscription	Serabit, Mine L	Egyptian Museum	52510 (partly lost)	1906, Petrie	1916, Gardiner
356	Rock panel	An inscription	An inscription	Serabit, Mine L	Egyptian Museum	51513 or 52515	1927, Lake	1928, Butin
357	Rock panel	An inscription	An inscription	Serabit, Mine L	In situ		1927, Lake	1928, Butin
358		An inscription	An inscription	Serabit, Mine M	In situ		1927, Lake	1928, Butin
359		An inscription	An inscription	Unknown	Egyptian Museum	52516	1929, Hjelt	
360	Slab	An inscription	An inscription	Ridge between Wadi Qattar and Wadi Umm Themeyim	Egyptian Museum	–	1930, Lake	1932, Butin
361	Small rock	An inscription	An inscription	Serabit, Mine N	Egyptian Museum	–	1930, Lake	1932, Butin
362	Lozenge	An inscription	An inscription	Serabit, above Mine L	Egyptian Museum	–	1930, Lake	1932, Butin
363		An inscription	An inscription	Serabit, south of Mine L	Egyptian Museum	–	1930, Lake	1932, Butin
364	Fragment	An inscription	An inscription	Serabit, in front of Mine M	Egyptian Museum	–	1930, Lake	1932, Butin
365	palimpsest	An inscription	An inscription	Serabit, Egyptian camp	Egyptian Museum	–	1930, Lake	1932, Butin
367	Rock panel	An inscription	An inscription	Serabit, south of Mine L	Egyptian Museum	–	1930, Lake	1932, Butin
374		An inscription	An inscription	Serabit, Mine M	Egyptian Museum	65466	1935, Lake	1936, Butin
375		An inscription	An inscription	Serabit, Mine M	Egyptian Museum	65467	1935, Lake	1936, Butin
Gerster 1				Wadi Nasb	In situ		Gerster	1961, Leibovitch
Gerster 2				Wadi Nasb	In situ		Gerster	1961, Leibovitch
Disputed (according to Albright):
355		An inscription			In situ		1906, Petrie	1916, Gardiner
366		An inscription	An inscription				1930, Lake	1932, Butin
368		An inscription	An inscription				1930, Lake	1932, Butin
369	Statuette	An inscription					1930, Lake	1932, Butin
370		An inscription	An inscription				1930, Lake	1932, Butin
371		An inscription	An inscription				1930, Lake	1932, Butin
372		An inscription	An inscription				1930, Lake	1932, Butin
373		An inscription	An inscription				1930, Lake	1932, Butin

== Bibliography ==
- Petrie, Flinders; Currelly, Charles Trick (2008) [1906]. Researches in Sinai. ATLA monograph preservation program. John Murray. ISBN 978-0-7905-2421-4.
- Gardiner, Alan H. (1916). "The Egyptian Origin of the Semitic Alphabet". The Journal of Egyptian Archaeology. 3 (1). Egypt Exploration Society: 1–16. doi:10.2307/3853586. ISSN 0307-5133. JSTOR 3853586.
- Gardiner, A.H.; Peet, T.E. (1917). The Inscriptions of Sinai: Part 1: Introduction and Plates. Memoirs (Egypt Exploration Society). Egyptian Exploration Fund.
- Lake, Kirsopp; Blake, Robert P. (1928). "The Serâbît Inscriptions: I. The Rediscovery of the Inscriptions". The Harvard Theological Review. 21 (1). Cambridge University Press: 1–8. doi:10.1017/S0017816000021155. ISSN 0017-8160. JSTOR 1507905. S2CID 161474162.
- Butin, Romain F. (1928). "The Serâbît Inscriptions: II. The Decipherment and Significance of the Inscriptions". The Harvard Theological Review. 21 (1). Cambridge University Press: 9–67. doi:10.1017/S0017816000021167. ISSN 0017-8160. JSTOR 1507906. S2CID 163011970.
- Butin, Romain F. (1932). "The Protosinaitic Inscriptions". The Harvard Theological Review. 25 (2). Cambridge University Press: 130–203. doi:10.1017/S0017816000001231. ISSN 0017-8160. JSTOR 1507943. S2CID 161237361.
- Butin, Romain F.; Starr, Richard Francis Strong (1936). "The New ProtoSinaitic Inscriptions". Excavations and Protosinaitic Inscriptions at Serabit El Khadem: Report of the Expedition of 1935. Studies and documents. Christophers.
- Leibovitch, Joseph (1961). "Deux nouvelles inscriptions proto- sinaitiques". Le Muséon (in French). 74. L'Association sans but lucratif "Le Muséon": 461 ff. ISSN 0771-6494.
- Rainey, A. F. (1975). "Notes on Some Proto-Sinaitic Inscriptions". Israel Exploration Journal. 25 (2/3). Israel Exploration Society: 106–116. ISSN 0021-2059. JSTOR 27925505.
- Beit-Arieh, Itzhak (1982). "New Discoveries at Serâbît el-Khâdîm". The Biblical Archaeologist. 45 (1). The American Schools of Oriental Research: 13–18. doi:10.2307/3209843. ISSN 0006-0895. JSTOR 3209843. S2CID 189473632.
- Arieh, Itzhaq Beit; Giveon, Raphael; Saas, Benjamin (1978). "Two previously unknown Proto Sinaitic inscriptions (in: Explorations at Serâbît El-Khâdim — 1977)". Tel Aviv. 5 (3–4). Maney Publishing: 183–187. doi:10.1179/033443578788497659. ISSN 0334-4355.
- Sass, B. (1988). The Genesis of the Alphabet and Its Development in the Second Millenium B.C. Ägypten und Altes Testament. In Kommission bei O. Harrassowitz. ISBN 978-3-447-02860-8.
