= Wadi el-Hol inscriptions =

Inscriptions on the Nile River's west bank

The Wadi el-Hol inscriptions are two rock inscriptions which appear to show some of the oldest examples of phonetic alphabetic writing discovered to date.

Wadi el-Hol is a valley on the Farshut Road crossing the Qena Bend between Thebes and Hiw, on the west bank of the river Nile in Egypt.

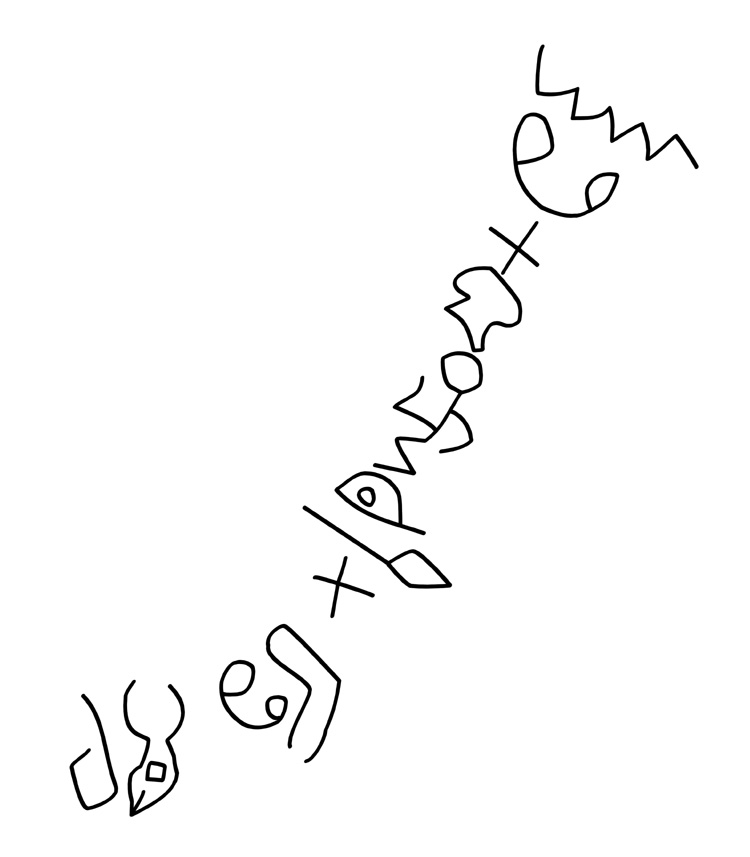
Wadi el-Hol inscriptions II drawing

== History ==
In 1993, American Egyptologists Deborah Darnell and her then husband John Darnell found letters in two single-line rock inscriptions carved into limestone cliffs in the Wadi el-Hol valley. They returned to the site for several seasons through the 1990s to further study the inscriptions. In 1999, they finally published their research, concluding that they had found the earliest surviving alphabet, dating back to around 1800 to 1900 BCE. In particular, the inscriptions appear to resemble the Proto-Sinaitic script from Serabit el-Khadem.

== See also ==
- Theban Desert Road Survey
- Proto-Sinaitic script
- Serabit el-Khadim
- Writing system
