= Proto-Sinaitic script =

Middle Bronze Age script

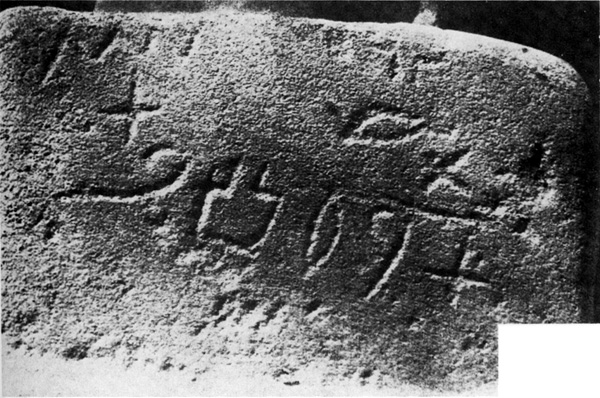
- Proto-Sinaitic inscription #346, the first published photograph of the script. The line running from the upper left to lower right may read mt l bʿlt '... to the Lady'
- Script type: Abjad
- Period: c. 19th–16th centuries BC
- Status: Partially deciphered
- Direction: Mixed
- Languages: Canaanite languages

Related scripts
- Parent systems: Egyptian hieroglyphs: Proto-Sinaitic script
- Child systems: Phoenician; South Semitic; ? Ugaritic

ISO 15924
- ISO 15924: Psin (103), Proto-Sinaitic

The Proto-Sinaitic script is a Middle Bronze Age writing system known from a small corpus of about 30–40 inscriptions and fragments from Serabit el-Khadim in the Sinai Peninsula, as well as two inscriptions from Wadi el-Hol in Middle Egypt. Together with about 20 known Proto-Canaanite inscriptions, it is also known as Early Alphabetic, i.e. the earliest trace of alphabetic writing and the common ancestor of the Paleo-Hebrew alphabet, the Ancient South Arabian script and the Phoenician alphabet, which led to many modern alphabets including the Greek alphabet and, subsequently, the Latin alphabet. According to common theory, Canaanites or Hyksos who spoke a Canaanite language repurposed Egyptian hieroglyphs to construct a different script.

The earliest Proto-Sinaitic inscriptions are mostly dated to between the mid-19th (early date) and the mid-16th (late date) century BC.

The principal debate is between an early date, around 1850 BC, and a late date, around 1550 BC. The choice of one or the other date decides whether it is proto-Sinaitic or proto-Canaanite, and by extension locates the invention of the alphabet in Egypt or Canaan respectively.

However, the discovery of the two Wadi el-Hol inscriptions near the Nile River suggests that the script originated in Egypt. The evolution of Proto-Sinaitic and the small number of Proto-Canaanite inscriptions from the Bronze Age is based on rather scant epigraphic evidence; it is only with the Bronze Age collapse and the rise of new Semitic kingdoms in the Levant that Proto-Canaanite is clearly attested (Byblos inscriptions 10th–8th century BC, Khirbet Qeiyafa inscription c. 10th century BC).

The first published group of Proto-Sinaitic inscriptions were discovered in the winter of 1904–1905 in Sinai by Hilda and Flinders Petrie. These ten inscriptions, plus an eleventh published by Raymond Weill in 1904 from the 1868 notes of Edward Henry Palmer, were reviewed in detail, and numbered (as 345–355), by Alan Gardiner in 1916. To this were added a number of short Proto-Canaanite inscriptions found in Canaan and dated to between the 17th and 15th centuries BC, and more recently, the discovery in 1999 of the two Wadi el-Hol inscriptions, found in Middle Egypt by John and Deborah Darnell. The Wadi el-Hol inscriptions strongly suggest a date of development of Proto-Sinaitic writing from the mid-19th to 18th centuries BC.

== Discovery ==
"I am disposed to see in this one of the many alphabets which were in use in the Mediterranean lands long before the fixed alphabet selected by the Phoenicians. A mass of signs was used continuously from 6,000 or 7,000 B.C., until out of it was crystallized the alphabets of the Mediterranean – the Karians and Celtiberians preserving the greatest number of signs, the Semites and Phoenicans keeping fewer... The two systems of writing, pictorial and linear, which Dr. Evans has found to have been used in Crete, long before the Phoenician age, show how several systems were in use. Some of the workmen employed by the Egyptians, probably the Aamu or Retennu – Syrians – who are often named, had this system of linear signs which we have found; they naturally mixed many hieroglyphs with it, borrowed from their masters. And here we have the result, at a date some five centuries before the oldest Phoenician writing that is known. Such seems to be the conclusion that we must reach from the external evidence that we can trace. The ulterior conclusion is very important – namely, that common Syrian workmen, who could not command the skill of an Egyptian sculptor, were familiar with writing at 1500 B.C., and this a writing independent of hieroglyphics and cuneiform. It finally disproves the hypothesis that the Israelites, who came through this region into Egypt and passed back again, could not have used writing. Here we have common Syrian labourers possessing a script which other Semitic peoples of this region must be credited with knowing."

— Flinders Petrie, 1906, Researches in Sinai

O my god, 「rescue」 [me] 「from」 the interior of the mine.

’l「ḫlṣ」[n]「b」t「k」nqb

— Text 350 Steliform rock panel, column ii, left column.

According to William Albright, in his book "The Proto-Sinaitic Inscriptions And Their Decipherment", the first inscriptions in the category now known as Proto-Sinaitic were discovered and copied by E.H Palmer in Wadi Magharah during the winter of 1868–1869. His text was not published until 1904. However, E.H. Palmer notes that he was not the first, others had done work before him and as such his work was more of a "Re-discovery". In the winter of 1905, Flinders Petrie and his wife Hilda were conducting a series of archaeological excavations in the Sinai Peninsula. During a dig at Serabit el-Khadim, an extremely lucrative turquoise mine used between the Twelfth and Thirteenth Dynasty and again between the Eighteenth and mid-Twentieth Dynasty, Petrie discovered a series of inscriptions at the site's massive invocative temple to Hathor, as well as some fragmentary inscriptions in the mines themselves. Petrie immediately recognized hieroglyphic characters in the inscriptions, but upon closer inspection realized the script was not the combination of logograms and syllabics as in Egyptian script proper. He thus assumed that the inscriptions showed a script that the turquoise miners had devised themselves, using linear signs that they had borrowed from hieroglyphics. He published his findings in London the following year.

Ten years later, in 1916, Alan Gardiner, one of the premier Egyptologists of the early and mid-20th century, published his own interpretation of Petrie's findings, arguing that the glyphs appeared to be early versions of the signs used for later Semitic languages such as Phoenician, and was able to assign sound values and reconstructed names to some of the letters by assuming they represented what would later become the common Semitic abjad. One example was the character, to which Gardiner assigned the ⟨b⟩ sound, on the grounds that it derived from the Egyptian glyph for 'house', and was very similar to the Phoenician letter bet, whose name derives from the Semitic word for “house”, bayt. Using his hypothesis, Gardiner was able to affirm Petrie's hypothesis that the mystery inscriptions were of a religious nature, as his model allowed an often recurring word to be reconstructed as lbʿlt, meaning "to Ba'alat" or more accurately, "to (the) Lady" – that is, the "lady" Hathor. Likewise, this allowed another recurring word mʿhbʿlt to be translated as "Beloved of (the) Lady", a reading which became very acceptable after the lemma was found carved underneath a hieroglyphic inscription which read "Beloved of Hathor, Lady of Turquoise". Gardiner's hypothesis allowed researchers to connect the letters of the inscriptions to modern Semitic alphabets, and resulted in the inscriptions becoming much more readable, leading to the immediate acceptance of his hypothesis.

== Development ==
The letters of the earliest script used for Semitic languages were derived from Egyptian hieroglyphs. In the 19th century, the theory of Egyptian origin competed alongside other theories that the Phoenician script developed from Akkadian cuneiform, Cretan hieroglyphs, the Cypriot syllabary, and Anatolian hieroglyphs. Then the Proto-Sinaitic inscriptions were studied by Alan Gardiner who identified the word bʿlt "Lady" occurring several times in inscriptions, and also attempted to decipher other words. In the 1950s and 1960s, William Albright published interpretations of Proto-Sinaitic as the key to show the derivation of the Canaanite alphabet from hieratic.

According to the "alphabet theory", the early Semitic proto-alphabet reflected in the Proto-Sinaitic inscriptions would have given rise to both the Ancient South Arabian script and the Proto-Canaanite alphabet by the time of the Late Bronze Age collapse (1200–1150 BC).

For example, the hieroglyph for pr "house" (a rectangle partially open along one side, "O1" in Gardiner's sign list) was adopted to write Semitic /b/, after the first consonant of baytu, the Semitic word for "house".

A transitional stage between Proto-Canaanite and Old Phoenician (1000–800 BC) has been proposed by authors such as Werner Pichler as the origin of the Libyco-Berber script used among Ancient Libyans (i.e. Proto-Berbers) – citing common similarities to both Proto-Canaanite proper and its early North Arabian descendants.

== Inscriptions ==
=== Serabit inscriptions ===
The Sinai inscriptions are best known from the Serabit el-Khadim proto-Sinaitic inscriptions, carved graffiti and votive texts from a mountain in the Sinai called Serabit el-Khadim and its temple to the Egyptian goddess Hathor (ḥwt-ḥr). The mountain contained turquoise mines which were visited by repeated expeditions over 800 years. Many of the workers and officials were from the Nile Delta, and included large numbers of Semitic peoples (i.e. speakers of an early form of Northwest Semitic ancestral to the Canaanite languages of the Late Bronze Age) who had been allowed to settle the eastern Delta.

Most of the forty or so inscriptions have been found among much more numerous hieratic and hieroglyphic inscriptions, scratched on rocks near and in the turquoise mines and along the roads leading to the temple.

The date of the inscriptions is mostly placed in the 17th or 16th century BC. An alternative view dates most of the inscriptions to the reign of Amenemhat III or his successor circa 1800 BC. It has been suggested that the dating period includes the reign of pharaoh Senwosret III.

Four inscriptions have been found in the temple, on two small human statues and on either side of a small stone sphinx. They are crudely done, suggesting that the workers who made them were illiterate apart from this script.

=== Wadi el-Hol inscriptions ===
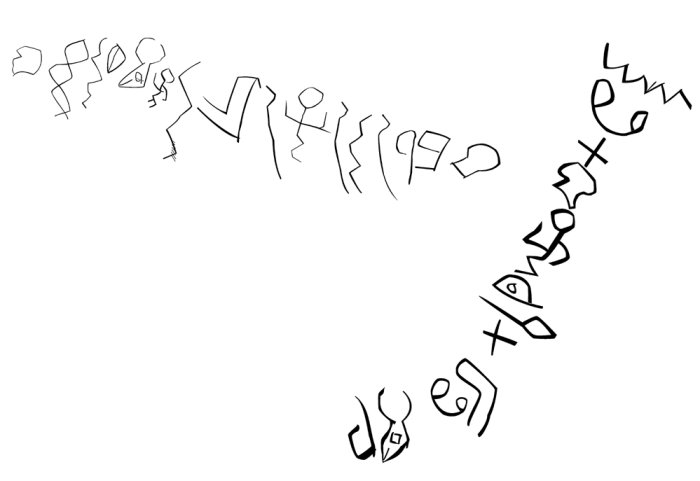
Traces of the 16 and 12 characters of the two Wadi el-Hol inscriptions

The two Wadi el-Hol inscriptions (Arabic: وادي الهول Wādī al-Hawl 'Ravine of Terror') were carved on the stone sides of an ancient high-desert military and trade road linking Thebes and Abydos, in the heart of literate Egypt. They have been dated to somewhere between 1900 and 1800 BC. They are in a wadi in the Qena bend of the Nile, at approx. 25°57′N 32°25′E, among dozens of hieratic and hieroglyphic inscriptions. Rock inscriptions in the valley appear to show the oldest examples of phonetic alphabetic writing discovered to date.

The inscriptions are graphically very similar to the Serabit inscriptions, but show a greater hieroglyphic influence, such as a glyph for a man that was apparently not read alphabetically: The first of these (h_{1}) is a figure of celebration [Gardiner A28], whereas the second (h_{2}) is either that of a child [Gardiner A17] or of dancing [Gardiner A32]. If the latter, h_{1} and h_{2} may be graphic variants (such as two hieroglyphs both used to write the Canaanite word hillul "jubilation" corresponding to הלל hallel or hillel in Hebrew) rather than different consonants.

A28 A17 A32
Hieroglyphs representing, reading left to right, celebration, a child, and dancing. The first appears to be the prototype for h_{1}, while the latter two have been suggested as the prototype for h_{2}.

Brian Colless has published a translation of the text, in which some of the signs are treated as logograms (representing a whole word, not just a single consonant) or rebuses:

[Vertical] mšt r h ʿnt ygš ʾl
[Vertical] Excellent banquet (mšt r[ʾš]) of the celebration (h[illul]) of ʿAnat (ʿnt). [It] will provide (ygš) ʾEl (ʾl)
[Horizontal] rb wn mn h ngṯ h ʾ p mẖ r
[Horizontal] plenty (rb) of wine (wn) [and] victuals (mn) for the celebration (h[illul]). We will sacrifice (ngṯ) to her (h) an ox (ʾ[lp]) and (p) a prime fatling (mẖ r[ʾš])."

Here, aleph, whose glyph depicts the head of an ox, is a logogram used to represent the word "ox" (*ʾalp), he, whose glyph depicts a man in celebration, is a logogram for the words "celebration" (*hillul) and "she/her" (hiʾ), and resh, whose glyph depicts a man's head, is a logogram for the word "utmost/greatest" (*raʾš). This interpretation fits into the pattern in some of the surrounding Egyptian inscriptions, with celebrations for the goddess Hathor involving inebriation.

=== Other possible inscriptions ===
Archaeological excavations at the site of Umm el-Marra have uncovered four inscribed clay cylinders dating to ca. 2300 BC whose incisions have been hypothesized to be Early Alphabetic Semitic writing, which would make them the oldest such examples.

In 2009, Stephanie Dalley published several tablets from the Schøyen Collection dating to the times of the First Sealand dynasty, four of which have been identified as examples of Early Alphabetic inscriptions. Other probable examples of Early Alphabetic inscriptions include an ostracon from a tomb in western Thebes and an inscribed sherd from Lachish, both dating to the 15th century BC.

In 2010, Stefan Wimmer published an inscription discovered at Timna Valley which he also identified as written in proto-Sinaitic writing, although he also noted that its authenticity is not certain.

== Table of symbols ==
Below is a table synoptically showing selected Proto-Sinaitic signs and the proposed correspondences with Phoenician letters and Egyptian hieroglyphs. Each glyph's inscription of origin is listed in parentheses. A full repertoire of the currently known letterforms can be found on pages 8 and 9 here: https://www.unicode.org/L2/L2019/19299-revisiting-proto-sinaitic.pdf. Also shown are the reconstructed sound values and names.

Possible ancestral hieroglyph	Serabit El-Khadim	Wadi El-Hol	Timna	IPA value	Reconstructed name	Phoenician/Paleo-Hebrew alphabet
F1𓃾	Aleph		—N/a	/ʔ/	ʾalp "ox"	𐤀
O1𓉐	(346)	—N/a	—N/a	/b/	bayt "house"	𐤁
O4𓉔	—N/a		—N/a	/b/	bayt "house"	𐤁
T14𓌙	Gimel	—N/a	—N/a	/g/	gaml "throw-stick"	𐤂
O31𓉿	(367)	—N/a	—N/a	/d/	dalt "door"	𐤃
K5𓆟 orK7𓆡	(Note: 𓆛's name may be reconstructed as "dagg" (Ugaritic, Hebrew), "nūn" (Aramaic, Akkadian, Phoenician?), or "samk" (Arabic, Old South Arabian?). However, the development of Proto-Sinaitic in Sinai and Egypt makes it part of the Northwest Semitic Languages, where "dagg" and "nūn" were used. When both 𓉿 and 𓆛 are found within the same inscription, they are either thought to be the same allophone, or they are thought to be misinterpreted as 𓉗 or Samekh respectively.) (346)	—N/a	—N/a	/d/	dag "fish"	𐤃
A28𓀠	(354)	—N/a	—N/a	/h/	haw "man calling"/ hll "jubilate"	𐤄
A2𓀁	—N/a		—N/a	/h/	haw "man calling"/ hll "jubilate"	𐤄
T3𓌉	Waw	?	—N/a	/w/	waw "hook"	𐤅
Z4𓏭 or D13𓂃	Zayin	—N/a		/z/ or /ð/	zayn "weapon" or ḏayp "eyebrow"	𐤆 (Note: Several sound mergers may have occurred by the time of the Phoenician language, including the merger of /ð/ into /z/, the merger of /x/ into /ħ/, the merger of /ɣ/ into /ʕ/, and the merger of /θ/ into /ʃ/.)
O6𓉗 or O31𓉿	(362)	—N/a	—N/a	/ħ/	ḥaṣir "mansion"	𐤇
V28𓎛	(349)			/x/	ḫayt "thread"	𐤇
F35𓄤	(Note: The Canaanites seem to have replaced the 𓄤 glyph with one resembling a spinning wheel (ṭayt) 𓊖.)	—N/a	—N/a	/tˤ/	ṭab "good"	𐤈
D36𓂝	Yad		—N/a	/j/	yad "hand"	𐤉
D46𓂧	(363)	—N/a		/k/	kap "palm"	𐤊
V1𓍢 orS39𓋿	(358) (348)	?		/l/	lamd "goad"	𐤋
N35𓈖	(354)			/m/	maym "water"	𐤌
I10𓆓	Nun		—N/a	/n/	naḥš "snake"	𐤍
R11𓊽	—N/a	—N/a	—N/a	/s/	samk "support"	𐤎
D4𓁹	Ayin			/ʕ/	ʿayn "eye"	𐤏
D21𓂋	(346)	—N/a	—N/a	/p/	pay "mouth"	𐤐
D25𓂏?N5𓇳	—N/a		—N/a	/p/	pay "mouth"	𐤐
O38𓊋			—N/a	/p/	piʾt "corner"	𐤐
M22𓇑 or M16𓇉	(356)	—N/a	—N/a	/sˤ/	ṣad "plant"	𐤑
𓫪	Qoph	—N/a	—N/a	/kˤ/ or /q/	qup "monkey"	𐤒
V24𓎗	—N/a	—N/a	—N/a	/kˤ/ or /q/	qaw "cord, line"	𐤒
D1𓁶 orD19𓂉	(352)			/r/	raʾš "head"	𐤓
𓻔	—N/a			/ʃ/	šamš "sun"	𐤔
𓻔	(357)	—N/a	—N/a	/ʃ/	šamš "sun"	𐤔
T10𓌔 orAa32𓐮?	(357) (348)		—N/a	/t͡θ/	ṯad "breast" (Note: There is no hieroglyph for Waw/hook, and there are no strong graphical matches for hieroglyphs: Ziqq/fetter (𓍿), Taw/mark (𓏴), and Ṯad/breasts (𓂑𓂑). Colless suggests these letters may have derived independently outside Egypt. Others have interpreted Ziqq, Waw, and Ṯad as coming from reinterpreted hieroglyphs, a copper ingot (𓈔), a mace (𓌉), and Aa32 (𓐮), respectively.)	𐤔
Z9𓏴?	Tof		—N/a	/t/	taw "mark"	𐤕

== See also ==
- Tell es-Safi inscription
- Proto-Canaanite
- Paleo-Hebrew alphabet

== Bibliography ==
=== Primary sources ===
- Petrie, Flinders; Currelly, Charles Trick (1906). Researches in Sinai. ATLA monograph preservation program. John Murray. ISBN 978-0-7905-2421-4.
- Gardiner, Alan H. (1916). "The Egyptian Origin of the Semitic Alphabet". The Journal of Egyptian Archaeology. 3 (1). Egypt Exploration Society: 1–16. doi:10.2307/3853586. ISSN 0307-5133. JSTOR 3853586.
- Gardiner, A.H.; Peet, T.E. (1917). The Inscriptions of Sinai: Part 1: Introduction and Plates. Memoirs (Egypt Exploration Society). Egyptian Exploration Fund.
- Lake, Kirsopp; Blake, Robert P. (1928). "The Serâbît Inscriptions: I. The Rediscovery of the Inscriptions". The Harvard Theological Review. 21 (1). Cambridge University Press: 1–8. doi:10.1017/S0017816000021155. ISSN 0017-8160. JSTOR 1507905. S2CID 161474162.
- Butin, Romain F. (1928). "The Serâbît Inscriptions: II. The Decipherment and Significance of the Inscriptions". The Harvard Theological Review. 21 (1). Cambridge University Press: 9–67. doi:10.1017/S0017816000021167. ISSN 0017-8160. JSTOR 1507906. S2CID 163011970.
- Butin, Romain F. (1932). "The Protosinaitic Inscriptions". The Harvard Theological Review. 25 (2). Cambridge University Press: 130–203. doi:10.1017/S0017816000001231. ISSN 0017-8160. JSTOR 1507943. S2CID 161237361.
- Butin, Romain F.; Starr, Richard Francis Strong (1936). "The New ProtoSinaitic Inscriptions". Excavations and Protosinaitic Inscriptions at Serabit El Khadem: Report of the Expedition of 1935. Studies and documents. Christophers.
- Leibovitch, Joseph (1961). "Deux nouvelles inscriptions proto- sinaitiques". Le Muséon (in French). 74. L'Association sans but lucratif "Le Muséon": 461 ff. ISSN 0771-6494.
- Rainey, A. F. (1975). "Notes on Some Proto-Sinaitic Inscriptions". Israel Exploration Journal. 25 (2/3). Israel Exploration Society: 106–116. ISSN 0021-2059. JSTOR 27925505.
- Beit-Arieh, Itzhak (1982). "New Discoveries at Serâbît el-Khâdîm". The Biblical Archaeologist. 45 (1). The American Schools of Oriental Research: 13–18. doi:10.2307/3209843. ISSN 0006-0895. JSTOR 3209843. S2CID 189473632.
- Arieh, Itzhaq Beit; Giveon, Raphael; Saas, Benjamin (1978). "Two previously unknown Proto Sinaitic inscriptions (in: Explorations at Serâbît El-Khâdim — 1977)". Tel Aviv. 5 (3–4). Maney Publishing: 183–187. doi:10.1179/033443578788497659. ISSN 0334-4355.
- Sass, B. (1988). The Genesis of the Alphabet and Its Development in the Second Millenium B.C. Ägypten und Altes Testament. In Kommission bei O. Harrassowitz. ISBN 978-3-447-02860-8.

=== Secondary sources ===
- Albright, W.F. (1966). The Proto-Sinaitic Inscriptions and Their Decipherment. Harvard theological studies. Harvard University Press. ISBN 978-0-89130-221-6.
- I. Biggs, M. Dijkstra, Corpus of Proto-sinaitic Inscriptions, Alter Orient und Altes Testament, Neukirchener Verlag, 1990.
- Colless, Brian E (1990). "The proto-alphabetic inscriptions of Sinai". Abr-Nahrain / Ancient Near Eastern Studies. 28: 1–52. doi:10.2143/anes.28.0.525711.
- Colless, Brian E (1991). "The proto-alphabetic inscriptions of Canaan". Abr-Nahrain / Ancient Near Eastern Studies. 29: 18–66. doi:10.2143/anes.29.0.525718.
- Colless, Brian E., "The Byblos Syllabary and the Proto-alphabet", Abr-Nahrain / Ancient Near Eastern Studies 30 (1992) 15–62.
- Colless, Brian E (2010). "Proto-alphabetic Inscriptions from the Wadi Arabah" (PDF). Antiguo Oriente. 8: 75–96.
- Colless, Brian E. (2014). "The Origin of the Alphabet: An Examination of the Goldwasser Hypothesis" (PDF). Antiguo Oriente. 12: 71–104.
- Darnell, John Coleman; Dobbs-Allsopp, F. W.; Lundberg, Marilyn J.; McCarter, P. Kyle; Zuckerman, Bruce (2005). "Two Early Alphabetic Inscriptions from the Wadi el-Hôl". The Annual of the American Schools of Oriental Research. 59: 63, 65, 67–71, 73–113, 115–124. JSTOR 3768583.
- Cowley, A. E. (1916). "The Origin of the Semitic Alphabet". The Journal of Egyptian Archaeology. 3 (1). Egypt Exploration Society: 17–21. doi:10.2307/3853587. ISSN 0307-5133. JSTOR 3853587.
- Cowley, A. E. (1929). "The Sinaitic Inscriptions". The Journal of Egyptian Archaeology. 15 (3/4). Egypt Exploration Society: 200–218. doi:10.2307/3854116. ISSN 0307-5133. JSTOR 3854116.
- Daniels, P.T.; Bright, W. (1996). The World's Writing Systems. Oxford University Press. ISBN 978-0-19-507993-7.
- Hamilton, Gordon J, The origins of the West Semitic alphabet in Egyptian scripts (2006)
- Fellman, Bruce (2000) "The Birthplace of the ABCs." Yale Alumni Magazine, December 2000.
- Sacks, David (2004). Letter Perfect: The Marvelous History of Our Alphabet from A to Z. Broadway Books. ISBN 0-7679-1173-3.
- Goldwasser, Orly, How the Alphabet Was Born from Hieroglyphs Biblical Archaeology Review 36:02, Mar/Apr 2010.
- Millard, A. R. (1986) "The Infancy of the Alphabet" World Archaeology. pp. 390–398.
- Ray, John D. (1986) "The Emergence of Writing in Egypt" Early Writing Systems; 17/3 pp. 307–316.
- Simons, Frank (2011). "Proto-Sinaitic – Progenitor of the Alphabet" (PDF). Rosetta. 9: 16–40.
- Stefan Jakob Wimmer / Samaher Wimmer-Dweikat: The Alphabet from Wadi el-Hôl – A First Try, in: Göttinger Miszellen. Beiträge zur ägyptologischen Diskussion, Heft 180, Göttingen 2001, p. 107–111
