= Colleen Darnell =

American Egyptologist (born 1980)

- Born: Colleen Marie Manassa; July 26, 1980 (age 46)
- Spouse: John Coleman Darnell

Academic background
- Education: Yale University (BA, MA, PhD)

Academic work
- Discipline: Egyptologist
- Sub-discipline: Art of ancient Egypt; New Kingdom; Late Period; Military of ancient Egypt
- Institutions: Yale University; University of Hartford

Instagram information
- Page: vintage_egyptologist
- Years active: 2017–present
- Followers: 323,000 (2026)
- Website: www.colleendarnell.com

Colleen Marie Darnell (/dɑːrˈnɛl/, née Manassa; born July 26, 1980) is an American Egyptologist, whose focus includes Late Period uses of the Underworld Books, ancient Egyptian military history, the literature of New Kingdom Egypt, and Egyptian revival history.

Her research in Egyptian military history has led to the first recreation of the tactics of the Battle of Perire, c. 1208 BCE and one source says that her study The Great Karnak Inscription of Merneptah "replaces all other earlier studies of the key historical narratives relating Merneptah's war against the Libyans." Her research on pharaoh Tutankhamun's military actions contributed to Tutankhamun's Armies: Battle and Conquest in Ancient Egypt's Late Eighteenth Dynasty (co-authored with John Coleman Darnell) and was featured in the historical section of the 2010 documentary "King Tut Unwrapped."

In Egypt, she has made several archaeological discoveries as the director of the Moalla Survey Project, an ongoing archaeological project.

== Biography ==
Colleen Manassa studied for her undergraduate and postgraduate degrees at Yale, gaining her B.A. in 2001 and Ph.D. 2005. Manassa was awarded the Mellon Fellowship in 2001 while living in Trumbull College. The same year she also received the Wrexham Prize awarded "for the best senior essay in the field of the humanities" for her essay "The Grand Karnak Inscription of Merneptah: Grand Strategy in the 13th Century B.C."

In 2006 she joined the faculty at Yale as an assistant professor and director of undergraduate studies. She was promoted to associate professor in 2010.

She taught art history at both the University of Hartford and Naugatuck Valley Community College in Waterbury, Connecticut.

=== Archaeological work ===
In 2008, Darnell created the Moalla Survey Project, an archaeological survey expedition in Egypt (under the auspices of the Egyptian Ministry of State for Antiquities) that has discovered several important new sites on the east bank of the Nile approximately 45 km south of Luxor, ranging in date from the late Predynastic period through the late Roman period. In 2010, she discovered an extensive late Roman settlement with over a hundred distinct structures. Within the necropolis of Moalla, the Moalla Survey Project also discovered a Nubian Pan Grave cemetery (c. 1600 BCE). In 2010, Darnell presented the first identification of Nubian (Pan Grave) pottery manufactured at the site of Umm Mawagir in Kharga Oasis.

=== Museum work ===
As curator of the exhibition "Echoes of Egypt: Conjuring the Land of the Pharaohs," Darnell assembled nearly one hundred objects ranging from ancient Egyptian objects to pieces that span two millennia of fascination with ancient Egypt. Critics described the exhibition as “an ambitious... landmark exhibition” with “careful curation." The exhibition was accompanied by print catalog and online catalogs, and included a driving tour of Connecticut Egyptian revival buildings.

== Personal life ==
In January 2013, it was discovered that Colleen Manassa and fellow professor John Darnell had been carrying out a long-running affair while she was an undergraduate studying under him. Within the small Near Eastern Languages and Civilizations (NELC) department, they were the only two faculty members in the even-smaller Egyptology program. "Four individuals with close ties to the department" claimed the relationship was common knowledge within the department, and Assyriology professor Benjamin Foster reported "the basic situation has been known for a very long time." In divorce documents filed by Darnell's wife Deborah Darnell on November 5, 2012, she asserted that the affair began in 2000 when Manassa was an undergraduate student under Darnell's direct supervision. On January 8, 2013, John Darnell admitted to the affair with his student and accepted a one-year suspension without pay. Darnell also admitted to "participating in the review" of Manassa's hiring and attempting to cover up his multiple policy violations. In August 2013 the university prohibited Darnell from holding an administrative position until 2023, and Manassa until 2018.

Now married, John and Colleen live in Durham, Connecticut.

=== Vintage fashion ===
Darnell, as well as her husband, are known for their choice of clothes, remarked upon as early as 2007. She has been interviewed by Racked, the historical fashion podcast Dressed: The History of Fashion, and Egypt Today.

In 2017, Darnell launched an Instagram account with the username 'Vintage Egyptologist'. With few Egyptian workers appearing in the pictures, the account was critiqued by fellow Egyptologists for being "scholars who know these problematic histories choose to engage in the aesthetics of colonialism."

== Books ==
- Darnell, John; Darnell, Colleen (2022). Egypt's Golden Couple: When Akhenaten and Nefertiti Were Gods on Earth. St. Martin's Publishing Group. ISBN 9781250272874.
- Darnell, John Coleman; Darnell, Colleen Manassa (2018). The Ancient Egyptian Netherworld Books. Society of Biblical Literature. ISBN 9780884142768.
- Manassa, Colleen (2013). Imagining the Past: Historical Fiction in New Kingdom Egypt. Oxford: Oxford University Press. ISBN 9780199947225.
- Manassa, Colleen (2013). Echoes of Egypt: Conjuring the Land of the Pharaohs. New Haven: Yale Peabody Museum of Natural History. ISBN 9781933789002.
- Manassa, Colleen (2007). The Late Egyptian Underworld: Sarcophagi and Related Texts from the Nectanebid Period. Wiesbaden: Harrassowitz Verlag. ISBN 9783447056717.
  - Winner of the Samuel and Ronnie Heyman Prize for Outstanding Scholarly Publication, 2008.
- Darnell, John Coleman; Manassa, Colleen (2007). Tutankhamun's Armies: Battle and Conquest during Ancient Egypt's Late 18th Dynasty. Hoboken: John Wiley & Sons. ISBN 9780471743583.
- Manassa, Colleen (2003). The Great Karnak Inscription of Merneptah: Grand Strategy in the 13th Century B.C. New Haven: Yale Egyptological Seminar. ISBN 9780974002507.
  - Winner of the Samuel and Ronnie Heyman Prize for Outstanding Scholarly Publication, 2008
