= Lauri Hjelt =

Finnish diplomat (1900–1972)

Ambassador of Finland to Spain
- In office 1961-1966

Ambassador of Foreign Affairs
- In office 1959-1961

Ambassador of Finland to Belgium
- In office 1957-1959

Personal details
- Born: Otto Lauri Mikael Hjelt; 4 September 1900 Tuusula, Finland
- Died: 3 October 1972 (aged 72)

Otto Lauri Mikael Hjelt (4 September 1900 Tuusula −3 October 1972) was a Finnish diplomat, a master of philosophy.

Hjelt was employed by the Ministry for Foreign Affairs in 1924–1932 and again in 1939. He served as the division chief in 1944–1946 and as the head of the newspaper office in 1946–1949. Between 1949 and 1951, he was the Consul General of Finland in Gothenburg and in 1951–1957 he served as a Chancellor in Budapest. Hjelt was Ambassador to Brussels in 1957–1959; Ambassador of Foreign Affairs, 1959–1961; and Ambassador to Madrid 1961–1966.

Hjelt's father was Arthur Hjelt.
