= Theban Desert Road Survey =

Archaeological research project

The Theban Desert Road Survey is an archaeological research project operated in conjunction with the Egyptian Ministry of Culture's Supreme Council for Antiquities that is being conducted in the Western Desert in Egypt that focuses on the ancient connections between Thebes and such settlements as the Kharga Oasis. The project uses remote sensing to identify roads and caravan trails that were used in antiquity to identify possible sites of previously unknown communities. Established in 1991 by Egyptologists Deborah Darnell and her then-husband John Coleman Darnell, the survey project grew substantially when it gained the support of Yale University in 1998. The Theban Desert Road Survey has discovered sites from Predynastic Egypt, including substantial caches of pottery and other artifacts.

The project was begun by Deborah Darnell and John Coleman Darnell, who started searching along caravan trails in the Western Desert west of Luxor in the early 1990s under an approach they described as desert road archaeology. Among their discoveries are inscriptions found at Wadi el-Hol, dating back 3,800 years, which are in the Proto-Sinaitic alphabet, some of the earliest known examples of phonetic alphabetic writing, in contrast to the pictographs used in Egyptian hieroglyphs.

In 2010, Zahi Hawass announced that the team had found a 218 acres (88 ha) site of a major residential and military center at Kharga Oasis at the end of the Girga Road dating back 3,500 years, the earliest known urban development in the Egyptian desert. The initial finds were made around the year 2000 providing evidence of a Persian outpost near a temple dating to over 2,500 years old, which led the Darnells to conclude that the site must be one of some importance. Other finds at the site showed pottery that indicated that there had been trade over a wide area and that there had been intensive baking operations and "large-scale ceramic production", all signs that the site had been a major settlement in antiquity.

At the site named Umm Mawagir (أم مواجير,"mother of bread molds" in Arabic), the Darnells discovered a substantial cache of bread molds, grinding stones and other baking implements, with a total of 1,000 lb of objects found, more than enough material to be "baking enough bread to feed an army" at a site with a population in the thousands during the period from 1650 BCE to 1550 BCE, a thousand years before any other known settlement in the area of the Kharga Oasis. The site "completely explains the rise and importance of Thebes", as that city's control over the oasis communities to its west at Kharga and Dakhla Oasis allowed it to retain control of the area and to avoid the incursions of the Hyksos who controlled the Nile Delta to the north and the Nubian people of Kerma to the south.

== Publications ==
- Darnell, John Coleman; Darnell, Deborah (1996). "The Theban Desert Road Survey" (PDF). Oriental Institute 1995-1996 Annual Report: 62–70.
- Darnell, John Coleman; Darnell, Deborah (1997). "The Theban Desert Road Survey" (PDF). Oriental Institute 1996-1997 Annual Report: 66–76.
- Darnell, John Coleman; Darnell, Deborah (1998). "The Theban Desert Road Survey" (PDF). Oriental Institute 1997-1998 Annual Report: 77–92.
- Darnell, John Coleman; Darnell, Deborah (2002). Theban Desert Road Survey in the Egyptian Western Desert, Volume 1: Gebel Tjauti Rock Inscriptions 1-45 and Wadi el-Hôl Rock Inscriptions 1-45 (PDF). Chicago: Oriental Institute of the University of Chicago. ISBN 9781885923172.
- Darnell, John Coleman (2013). Theban Desert Road Survey II: The Rock Shrine of Paḥu, Gebel Akhenaton, and Other Rock Inscriptions from the Western Hinterland of Qamûla. New Haven: Yale Egyptological Seminar. ISBN 9780974002569.
