= Tursiannotko =

Archaeological site in Pirkkala, Finland

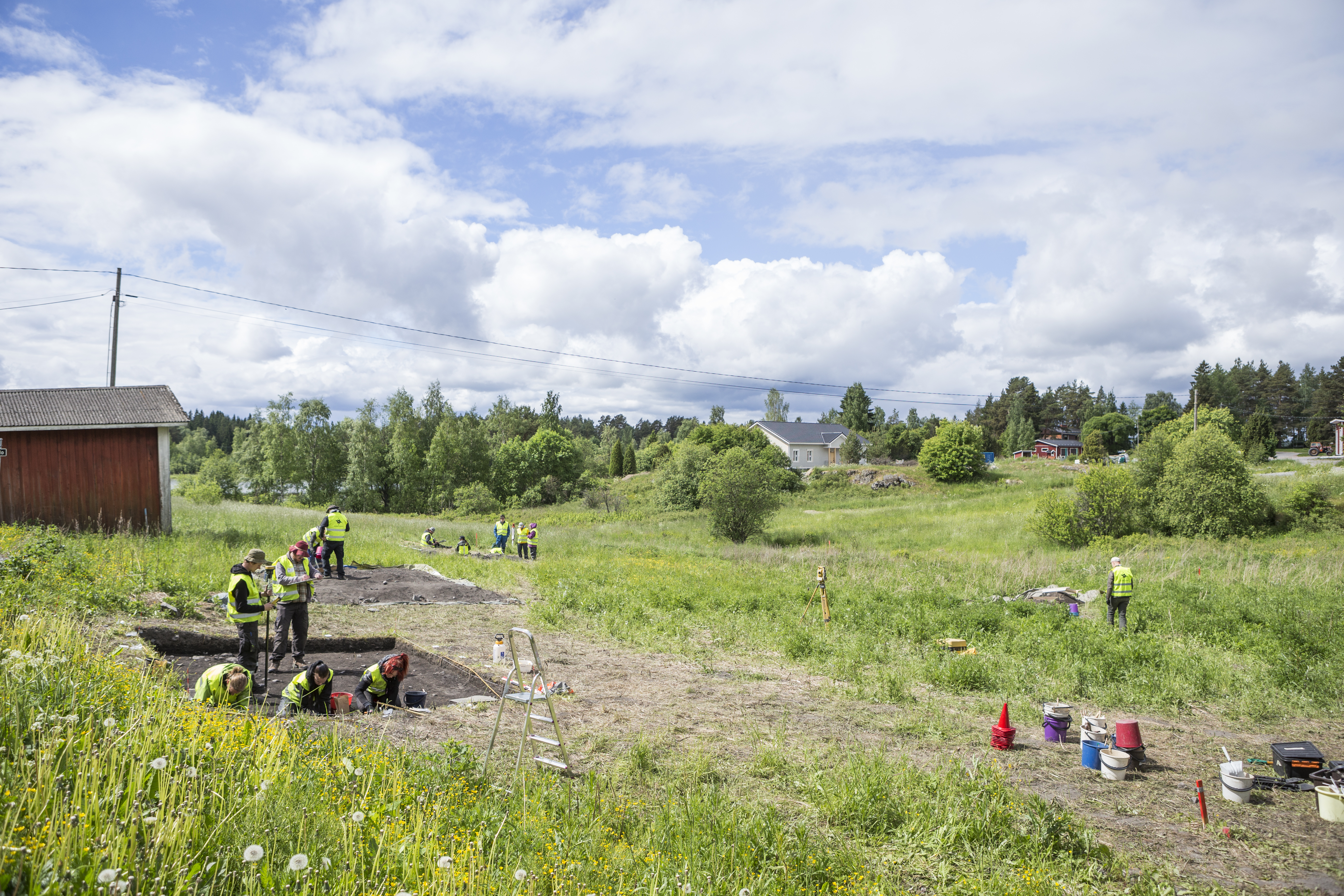
Archaeological excavation at Tursiannotko in June 2016.

Tursiannotko is a Late Iron Age dwelling site located in Pirkkala, Finland. It has been archaeologically excavated since 1999.

== Site ==
It's estimated that the dwelling site was inhabited at the beginning of the Viking Age. While some individual finds have been dated to as early as the 5th century, there are no structural remains supporting that early habitation.

The excavations have uncovered remains of 3–5 houses that were dated from Late Iron Age to the 13th century. The only house that has been completely excavated is one-roomed log cabin, that was built on top of a clay flooring. Radiocarbon dating has dated the cabin to the 9th or 10th century, being from the beginning or mid Viking Age. During the excavation, a foundation for possible stove was found inside the cabin, which would make it the oldest dated stove found in Finland. Another cabin that has been partially excavated was dated to the 11th or 12th century, meaning the Late Viking Age or Early Crusade Age.

Due to the suitable soil conditions, Tursiannotko bone artifacts have preserved exceptionally well in contrary to other archaeological sites in Finland. As of 2017, 1560 excavated bone fragments have been identified, the most common animal being pig. Besides dietary bone fragments, there have been discoveries of multiple bone objects, including arrow heads.

Tursiannotko dwelling site grew steadily during the Middle Ages and by the 15th century it had grown into the Pirkkalankylä village, that was first mentioned in 1442.
