= Robert Pierpont Blake =

American historian

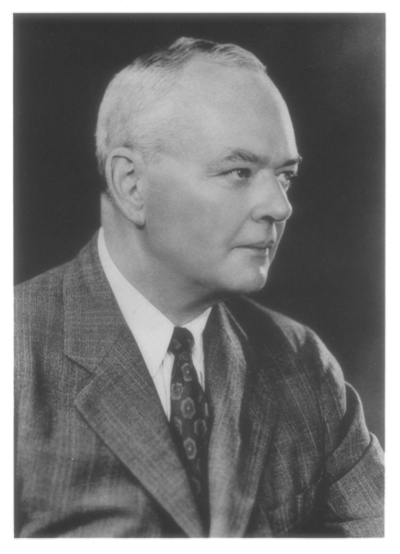
Robert Pierpont Blake

Robert Pierpont Blake (November 1, 1886 – May 9, 1950) was an American byzantinist and scholar of the Armenian and Georgian cultures.

== Biography ==
Robert P. Blake was born in San Francisco on November 1, 1886. As a John Harvard Traveling Fellow, he chiefly studied and worked, between 1911 and 1918, in Russia where he mastered Russian and began his study of Arabic, Syriac, Armenian and Georgian.

In 1918, on behalf of the Saint Petersburg State University, he arrived in Georgia to update the conflicting catalogues of the Tbilisi manuscripts and then to investigate various texts of the Bible. He became a professor of Tbilisi State University when it was founded early in 1918. He remained there and taught the Greek language and the Byzantine history until Sovietization of Georgian Democratic Republic. As a volunteer he fought Russian invaders near Tbilisi at Tabakhmela in February 1921.

In 1921 he received an appointment from Harvard of which he later became a professor. He was instrumental in promoting Byzantine studies in the United States. He also made an invaluable contribution to the study of medieval Georgian manuscripts many of which were revealed by Blake in Palestine and Mount Athos. He was elected to the American Academy of Arts and Sciences in 1927 and the American Philosophical Society in 1944. He died in Cambridge, Massachusetts, on May 9, 1950.
