= Serabit el-Khadim =

Archaeological site in southwestern Sinai

- Location within Egypt
- 29°2′12″N 33°27′33″E
- Location: Egypt

Site notes
- Excavation dates: 1904
- Archaeologists: Flinders Petrie

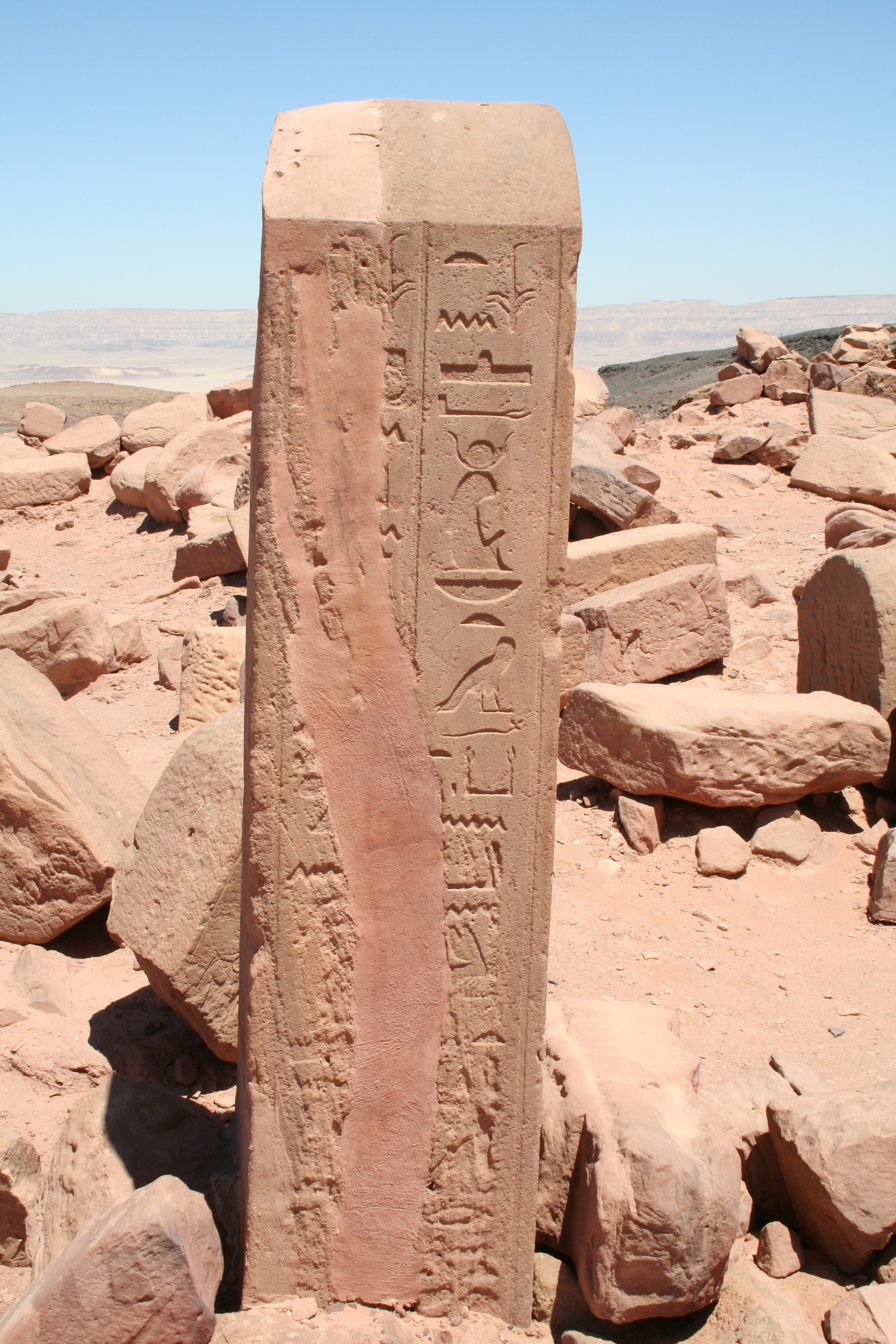
Remains of Temple of Hathor, Serabit el-Khadim

Serabit el-Khadim (Arabic: سرابيط الخادم Arabic pronunciation: [saraːˈbiːtˤ alˈxaːdɪm]; also transliterated Serabit al-Khadim, Serabit el-Khadem) is a locality in the southwest Sinai Peninsula, Egypt, where valuable resources such as turquoise were mined extensively in antiquity, mainly by the ancient Egyptians. Archaeological excavation, initially by Sir Flinders Petrie, revealed ancient mining camps and a long-lived Temple of Hathor, the Egyptian goddess of sensual power, who was favored as a protector in desert regions and known locally as the mistress of turquoise.

The Sinai Peninsula between Egypt and Western Asia was an important mining area for copper and malachite in ancient Egypt, Serabit el-Khadim being the most important copper mining site in the region. The temple was first established during the Middle Kingdom in the reign of Senusret I (reigned 1971 BC to 1926 BC) and was partly reconstructed in the New Kingdom. The temple is located about 10 kilometers north of Wadi Maghara, another archaeological site, and roughly 43 kilometers east of the modern-day city, Abu Zenima. The function of the temple was to honor the goddess Hathor who acted as a guide to the Egyptian kings who had undertaken expeditions to utilize these mines, and to glorify the power of the Pharaohs that had overseen these missions.

Various chapels were also constructed by the rulers that would follow, and commemorative stelae were erected along the path by the expedition and mining groups that came to work at this location. The temple was a place of worship and healing practices, as evidenced by the numerous votive stelae found along the pathway, inside the temple itself and within the nearby caves. The site's name is derived from these as well, with 'Serabit el-Khadim' translating to "Columns of the Slave," in reference to the tall inscribed columns that make up and surround the temple.

The copper and turquoise mines at the site were in use throughout the Middle Kingdom and New Kingdom periods. The mines were worked by prisoners of war from southwest Asia who presumably spoke a Northwest Semitic language, such as the Canaanite that was ancestral to Phoenician and Hebrew.

== Inscriptions ==
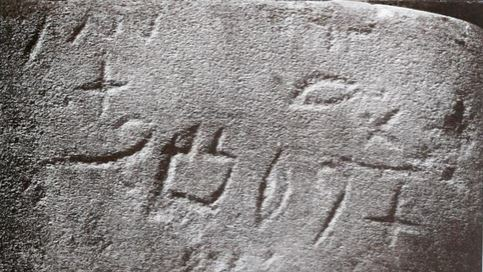
#346 of the Serabit el-Khadim proto-Sinaitic inscriptions, found by Flinders Petrie

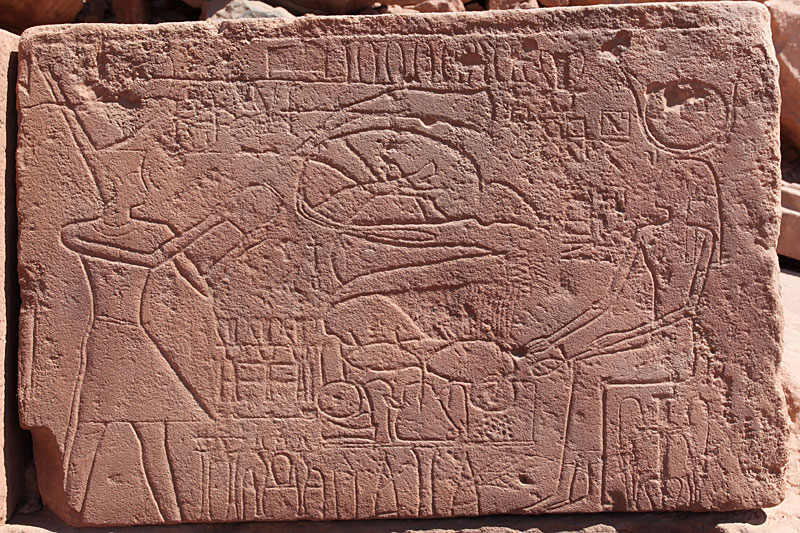
Amenemhat III offers to Hathor, court P, Temple of Hathor, Serabit el-Khadim, South Sinai, Egypt

Found at the site, there are about 30 early inscriptions in a "Proto-Sinaitic script" which shed light on the history of the alphabet. These Sinaitic inscriptions are some of the earliest examples of alphabetic writing and were discovered in 1904 by British archaeologist Sir Flinders Petrie.

The inscriptions date from the beginning of the 16th century BC, and while not fully deciphered, provide an early example of alphabetic rather than ideographic writing. These inscriptions were likely influenced by Egyptian Hieroglyphics and Canaanite writing from around 1900-1800 BCE, which would seemingly provide ancestry for the North Semitic Alphabet, the earliest fully developed alphabetic system. Other findings at the site include private and royal stelae and offerings which originated from the New Kingdom time period.

== Gallery ==
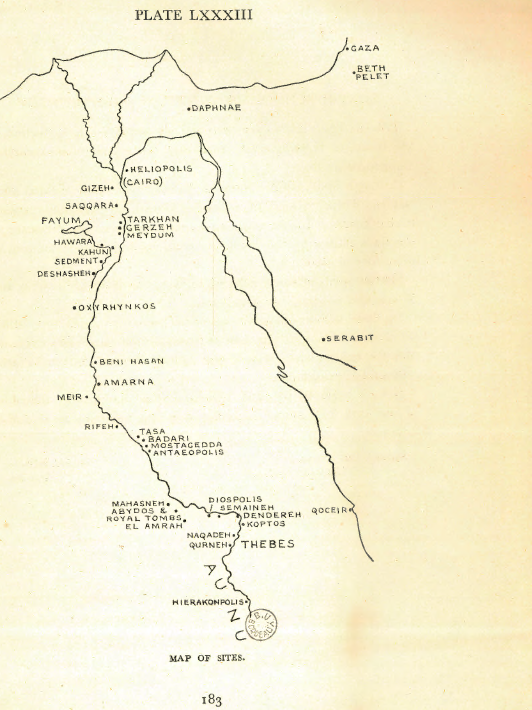
Map from Petrie, The Making of Egypt

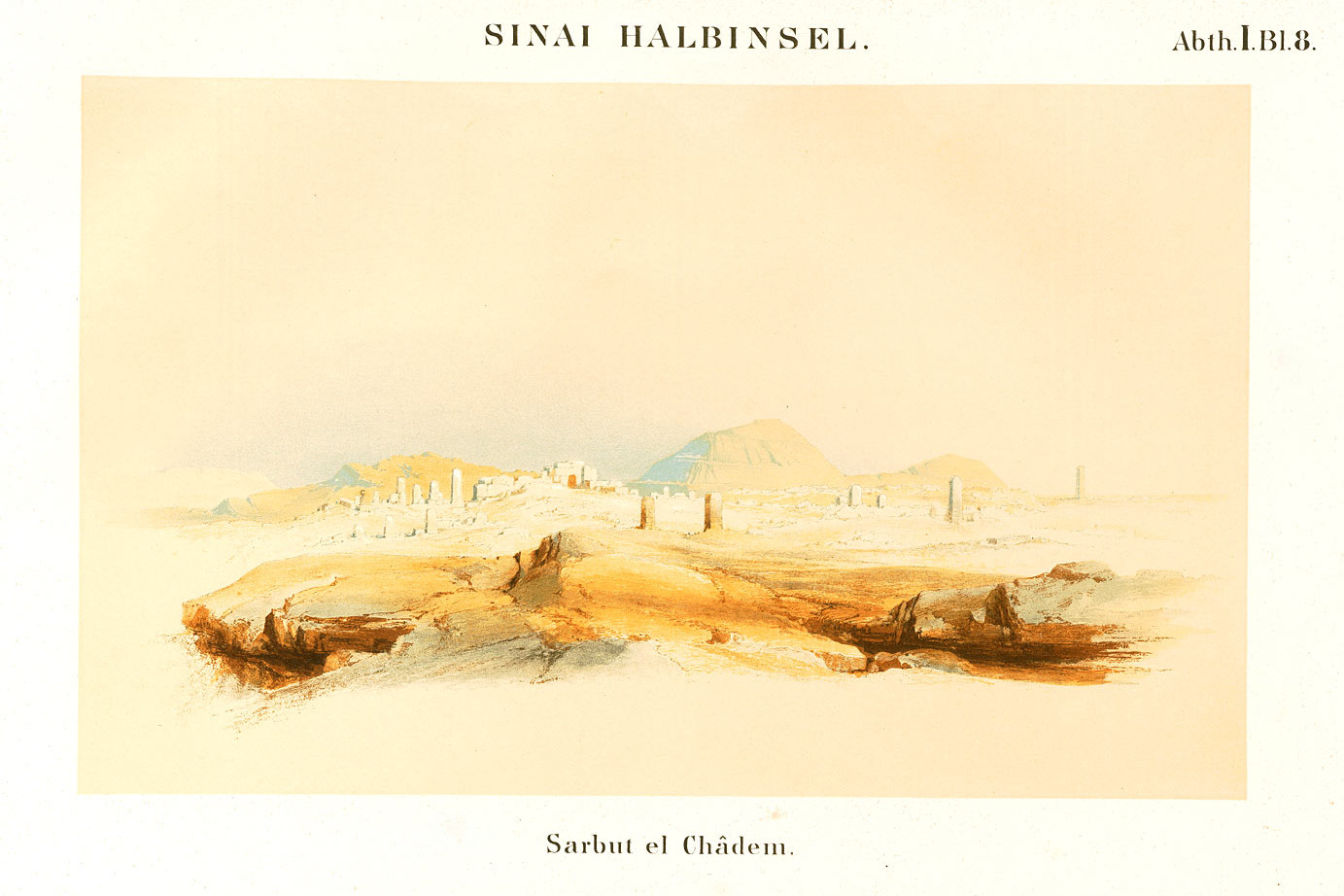
Illustration prepared by a 19th-century Prussian expedition

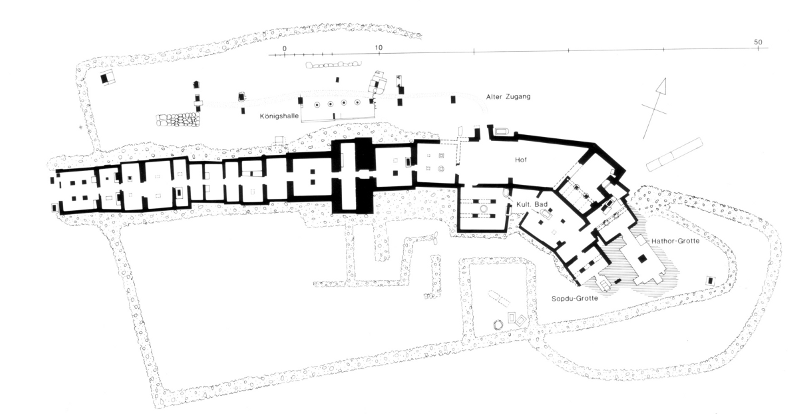
Floor plan of the Hathor temple in Serabit el-Khadim

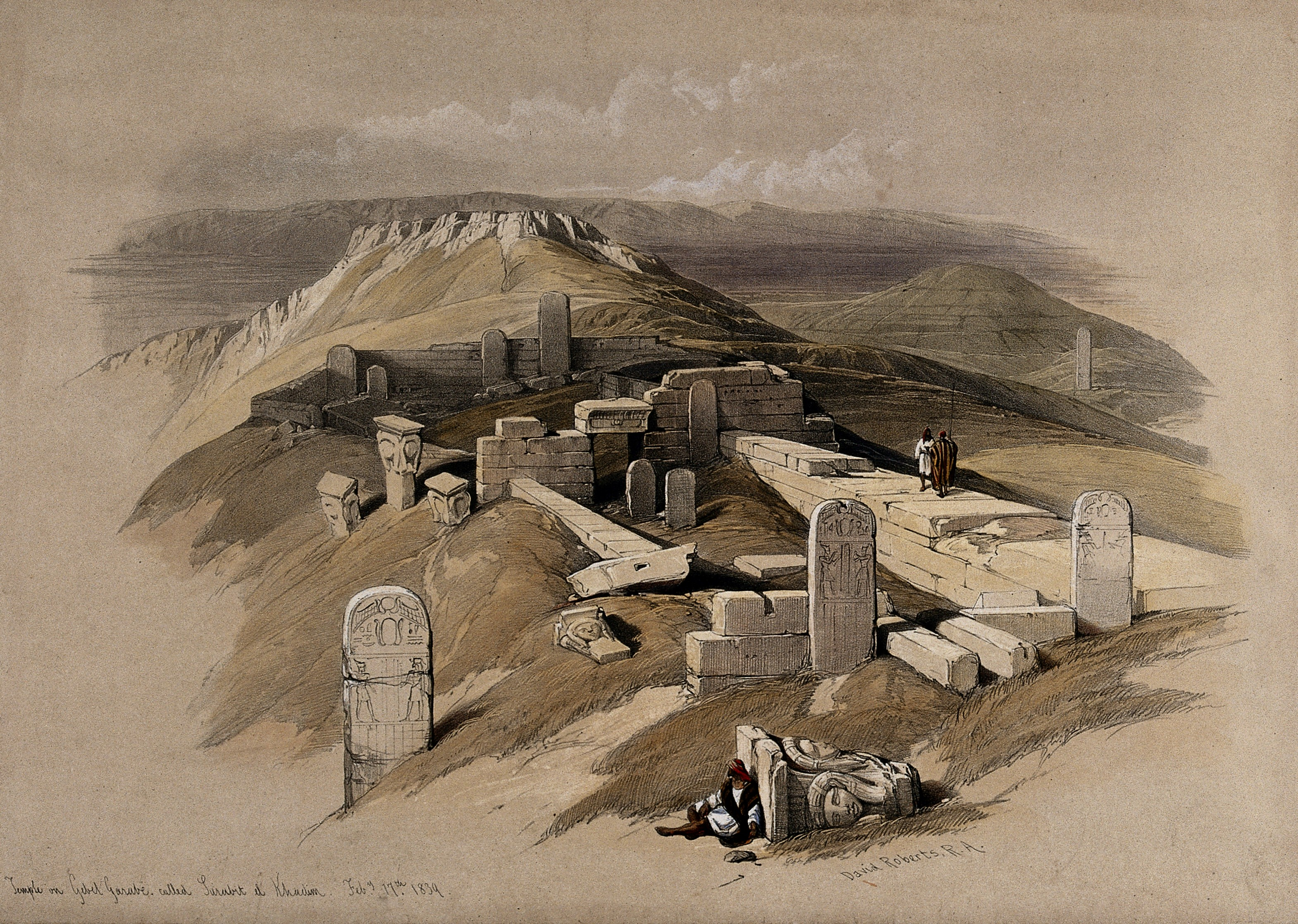
1840s sketch from The Holy Land, Syria, Idumea, Arabia, Egypt, and Nubia

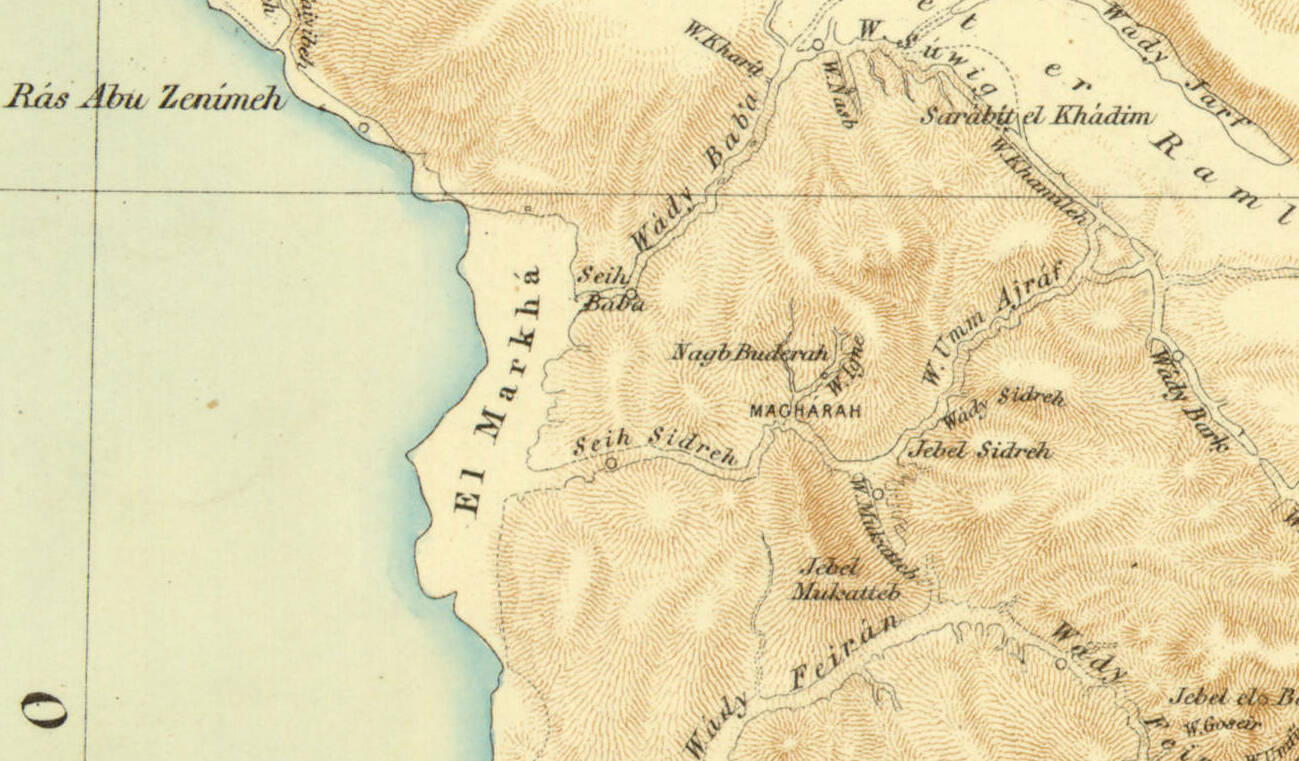
Serabit el-Khadim in the 1869 Ordnance Survey of the Peninsula of Sinai

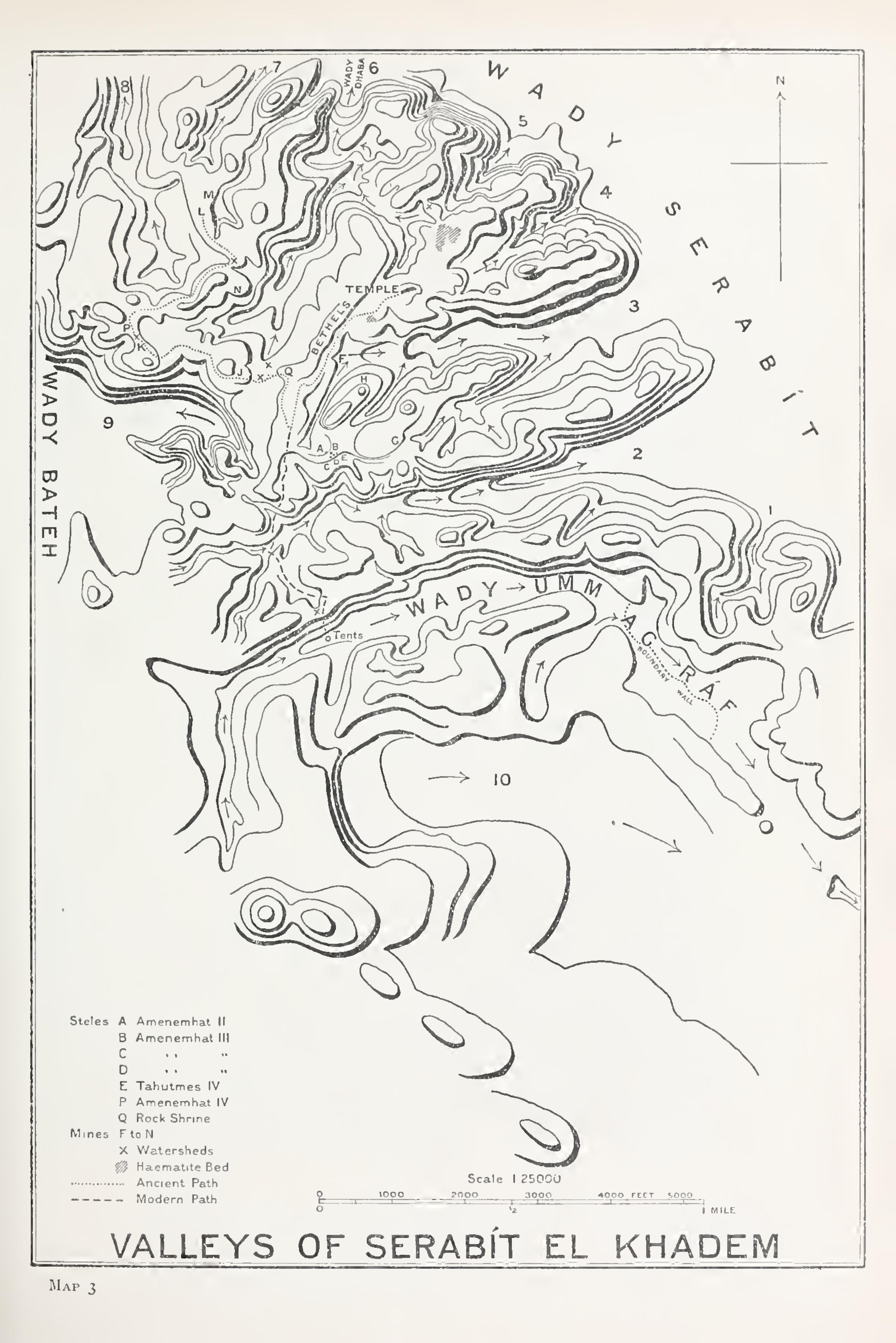
1906 map by Flinders Petrie

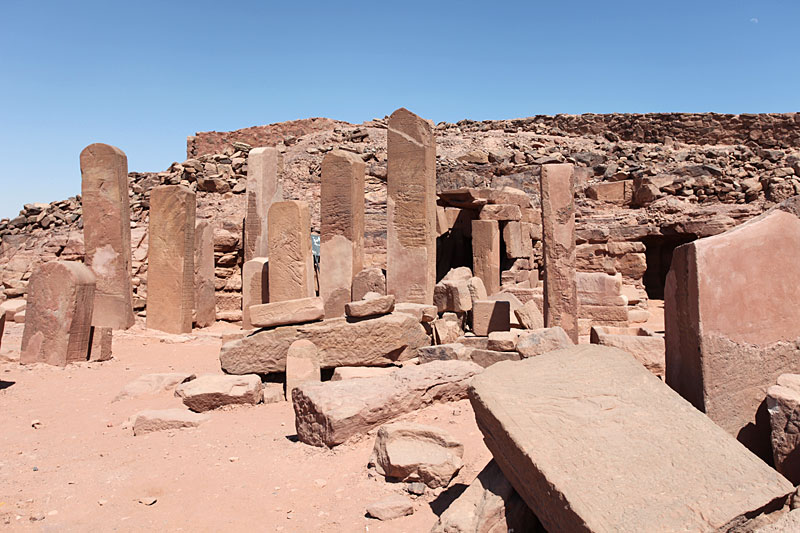
2009

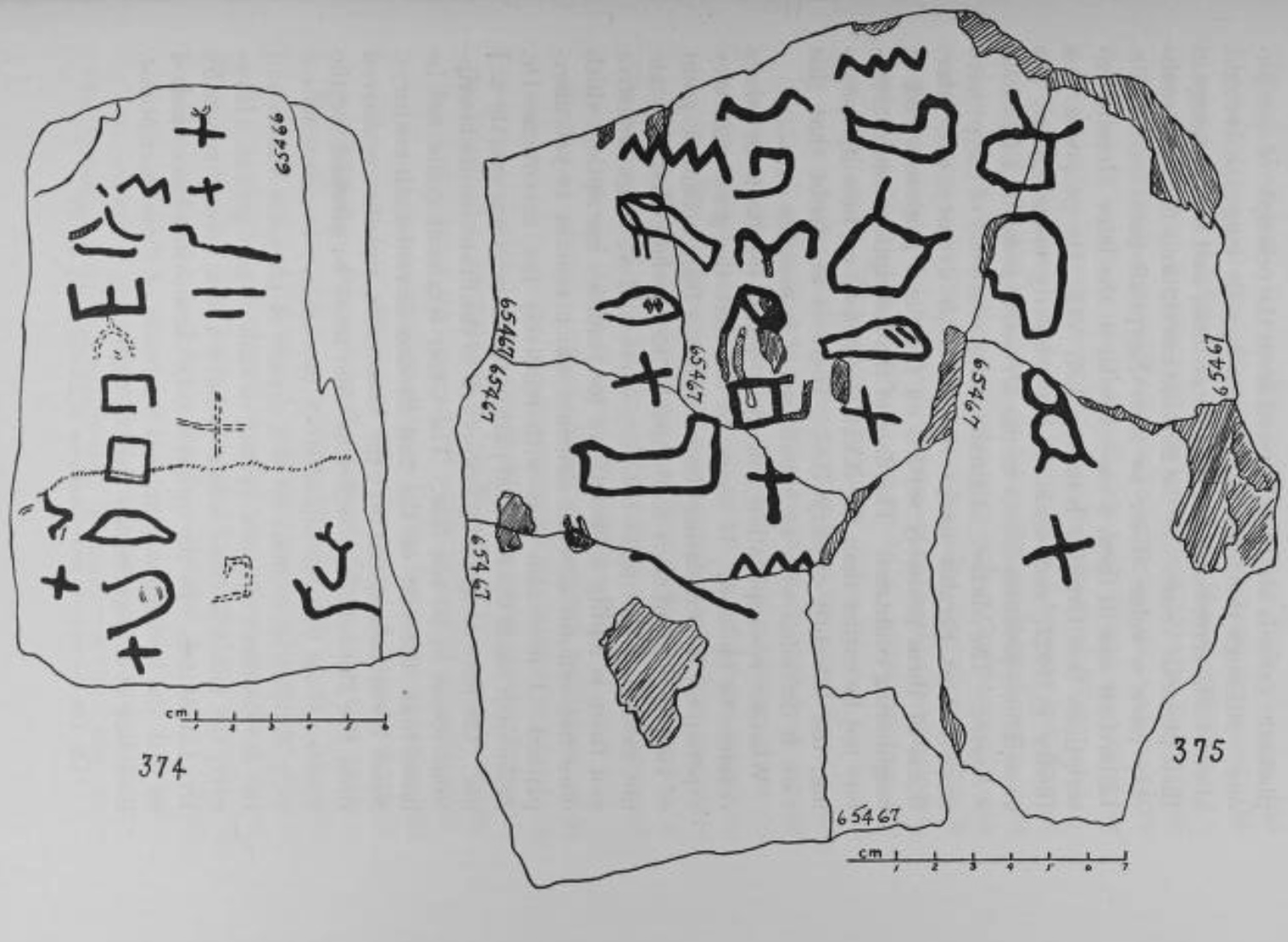
Serabit el-Khadim inscriptions, 358 (1936).

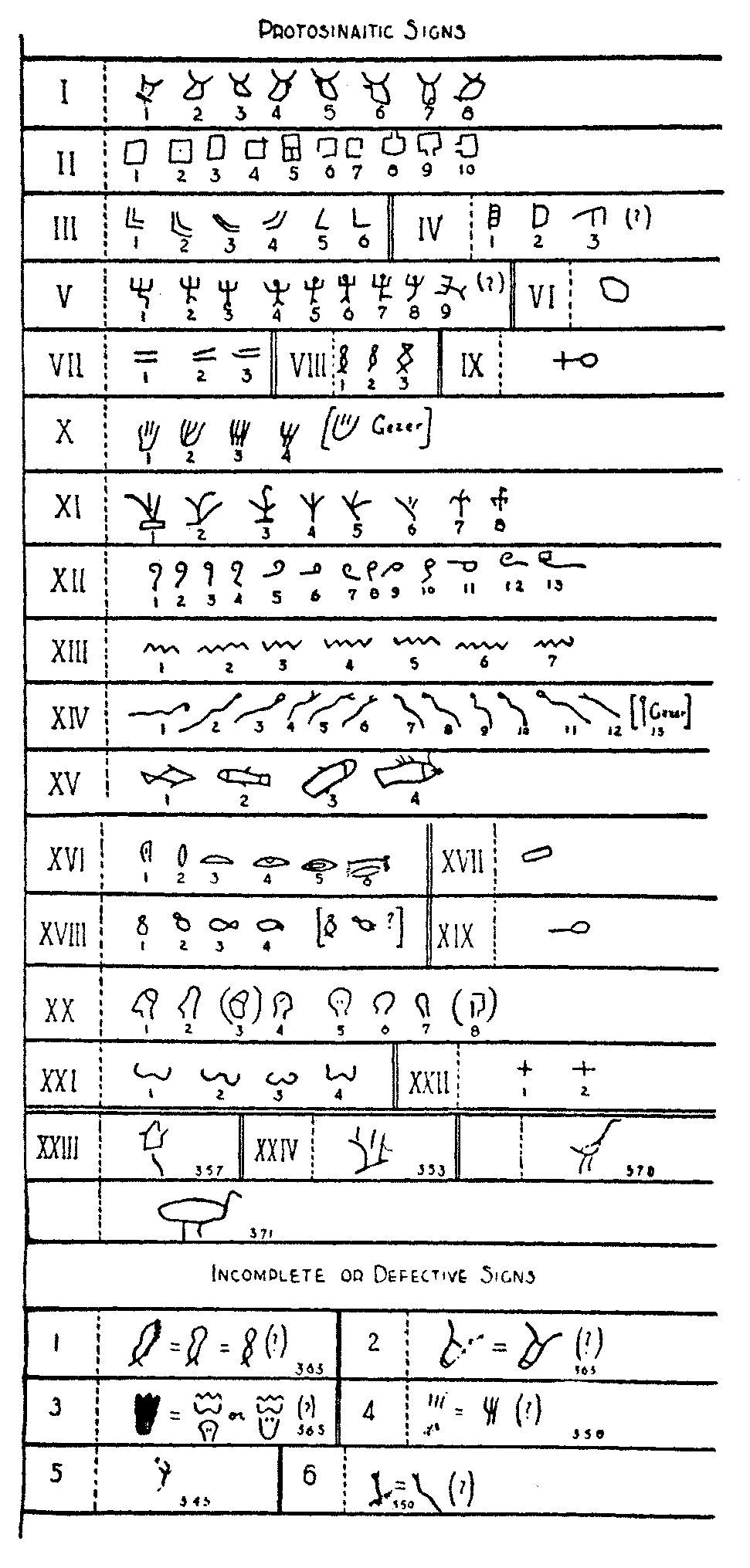
Table of the Alphabet, found at Serabit el-Khadim (1928).

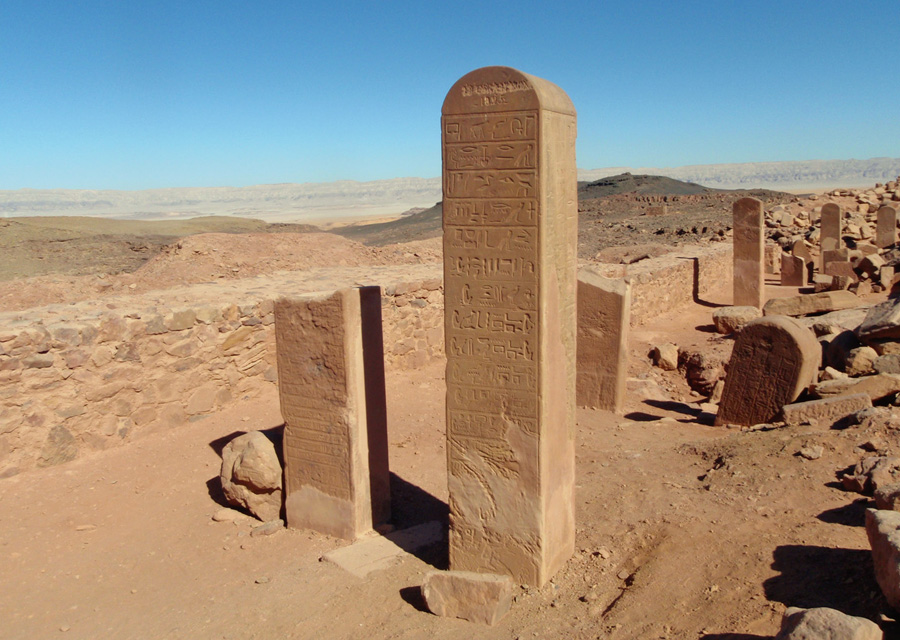
Votive Pillars at Temple to Hathor

== See also ==
- Dophkah
