= John Coleman Darnell =

American Egyptologist (born 1962)

John Darnell
- Born: John Coleman Darnell; August 1962 (age 64); Prattville, Alabama, U.S.
- Spouses: Deborah Darnell (m. 1989; div. 2012) Colleen Darnell (before 2017)

Academic background
- Education: Johns Hopkins University (BA, MA); University of Chicago (PhD)

Academic work
- Discipline: Egyptologist
- Sub-discipline: Desert caravan routes
- Institutions: Yale University

John Coleman Darnell (born August 1962) is an American Egyptologist.

== Biography ==
Darnell attributes his interest in archaeology to his mother, who also had a lifelong interest in archaeology. He grew up in south Alabama and had a particular interest in the Mississippian Mound Builders. Darnell tells a story of his mother reading him archaeology books as a child, hoping he would take a nap, but he was fascinated and did not nap.

Darnell got his BA (1984) and MA (1985) at Johns Hopkins University and his PhD (1995) at the Oriental Institute of the University of Chicago. He joined the Yale Department of Near Eastern Languages & Civilizations as Assistant Professor in 1998; he became Associate Professor in 2004, and Professor of Egyptology in 2005.

He was the director of the Theban Desert Road Survey, which has used remote sensing to detect transportation networks between settlements in the Western Desert of Egypt that has focused on the connections between Thebes and such settlements as the Kharga Oasis.

In January 2013, it was discovered that John Darnell had engaged in a long-running affair with his student-turned-coworker Colleen Manassa. Within the small Near Eastern Languages and Civilizations (NELC) department, they were the only two faculty members in the even-smaller Egyptology program. "Four individuals with close ties to the department" claimed the relationship was common knowledge within the department, and Assyriology professor Benjamin Foster reported "the basic situation has been known for a very long time." In divorce documents filed by Darnell's wife Deborah Darnell on November 5, 2012, she asserted that the affair began in 2000 when Manassa was an undergraduate student under Darnell's supervision. On January 8, 2013, John Darnell admitted to the affair and accepted a one-year suspension without pay. Darnell also admitted to "participating in the review" of Manassa's hiring and attempting to cover up his multiple policy violations. In August the university prohibited Darnell from holding an administrative position until 2023, and Manassa until 2018.

Eventually John was invited back to teach, but Colleen left Yale in 2015.

Now married, the pair are residents of Durham, Connecticut. Their book Egypt's Golden Couple: When Akhenaten and Nefertiti Were Gods on Earth was released in November 2022.

In 2007 he had a dog Antef, named after King Antef II. In 2020 he and Colleen have two Basenji dogs, Narmer (after Narmer) and Kemi (from the root km meaning "black").

== Public image ==
Darnell has been called an Indiana Jones type figure. In December 2006 a student of his created a Facebook group titled, "John C. Darnell...Man, Myth or Legend?" due to eccentricities such as wearing a monocle, and one time when "Darnell accidentally took a chunk out of a classroom chair with an ancient sword". He dresses in 1920s-era vintage clothing, both in his professional life and on an every-day basis.

== Books ==
- Darnell, John; Darnell, Colleen (2022). Egypt's Golden Couple: When Akhenaten and Nefertiti Were Gods on Earth. St. Martin's Publishing Group. ISBN 9781250272874.
- Darnell, John Coleman (2021). Egypt and the Desert. Cambridge University Press. ISBN 9781108820530.
- Darnell, John Coleman; Darnell, Colleen Manassa (2018). The Ancient Egyptian Netherworld Books. Society of Biblical Literature. ISBN 9780884142768.
- Darnell, John Coleman (2013). Theban Desert Road Survey II: The Rock Shrine of Paḥu, Gebel Akhenaton, and Other Rock Inscriptions from the Western Hinterland of Qamûla. New Haven: Yale Egyptological Seminar. ISBN 9780974002569.
- Darnell, John Coleman; Manassa, Colleen (2007). Tutankhamun's Armies: Battle and Conquest during Ancient Egypt's Late 18th Dynasty. Hoboken: John Wiley & Sons. ISBN 9780471743583.
- Darnell, John Coleman (2006). The Inscription of Queen Katimala at Semna: Textual Evidence for the Origins of the Napatan State. New Haven: Yale Egyptological Seminar. ISBN 9780974002538.
- Darnell, John Coleman (2004). The Enigmatic Netherworld Books of the Solar-Osirian Unity: cryptographic compositions in the tombs of Tutankhamun, Ramesses VI and Ramesses IX. Göttingen: Vandenhoeck & Ruprecht. ISBN 9783525530559.
- Darnell, John Coleman; Darnell, Deborah (2002). Theban Desert Road Survey in the Egyptian Western Desert, Volume 1: Gebel Tjauti Rock Inscriptions 1-45 and Wadi el-Hôl Rock Inscriptions 1-45 (PDF). Chicago: Oriental Institute of the University of Chicago. ISBN 9781885923172. ARCHIVED COPY

== Articles ==
- John Coleman Darnell & Deborah Darnell, THE LUXOR-FARSHUT DESERT ROAD SURVEY 1992-1993 Annual Report, institute for the Study of Ancient Cultures, University of Chicago (An article which claims that Nubkheperre Intef was the son of one of the two Sobekemsaf kings) ARCHIVED COPY
- John Coleman Darnell & Deborah Darnell, THE LUXOR-FARSHUT DESERT ROAD SURVEY 1993-1994 Annual Report, institute for the Study of Ancient Cultures, University of Chicago
- John Coleman Darnell & Deborah Darnell, THE LUXOR-FARSHUT DESERT ROAD SURVEY 1994-1995 Annual Report, institute for the Study of Ancient Cultures, University of Chicago
- John Coleman Darnell, Iconographic Attraction, Iconographic Syntax, and Tableaux of Royal Ritual Power in the Pre- and Proto-Dynastic Rock Inscriptions of the Theban Western Desert, ARCHÉO-NIL, Vol.19 - janvier 2009, pp. 83–107 ARCHIVED COPY
- John Coleman Darnell, UCLA Encyclopedia of Egyptology: Wadi-el-Hol, Version 1, May 2013, pp. 1–19 ARCHIVED COPY
- John Coleman Darnell, The Early Hieroglyphic Annotation in the Nag el-Hamdulab Rock Art Tableaux, and the Following of Horus in the Northwest Hinterland of Aswan, ARCHÉO-NIL, No.25 - février 2015, pp. 19–43 ARCHIVED COPY
- John Coleman Darnell, The Stela of the Viceroy Usersatet (Boston MFA 25.632), his Shrine at Qasr Ibrim, and the Festival of Nubian Tribute under Amenhotep II, ENIM (Équipe Égypte Nilotique et Méditerranéenne), Vol.7, 2014, p. 239-277 ARCHIVED COPY
