= Amenhotep III =

Ninth Pharaoh of the Eighteenth dynasty of Egypt

- Nibmu(`w)areya, Mimmureya, Nimmureya, Amenophis III
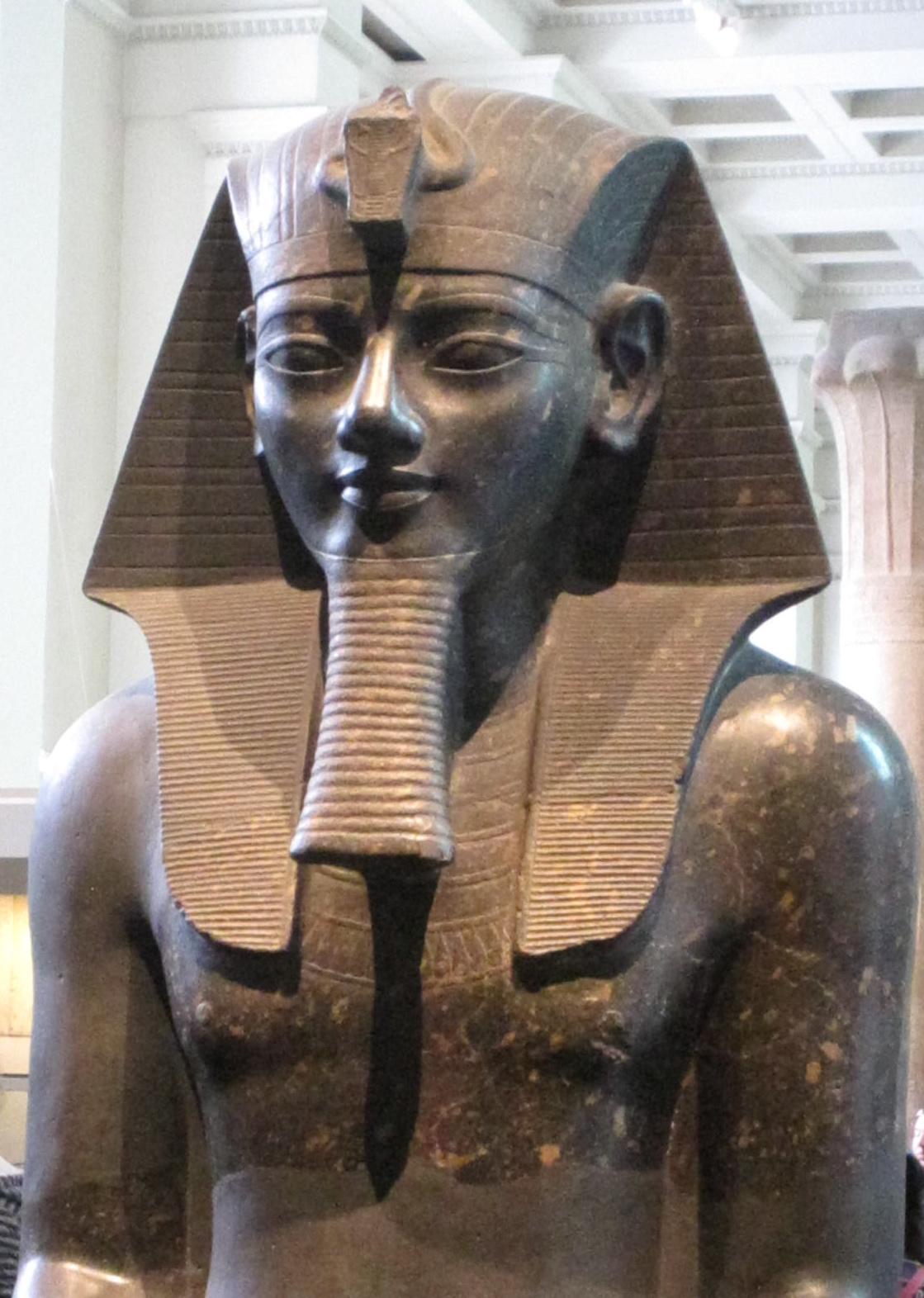
- Amenhotep III statue in the British Museum

Pharaoh
- Reign: c. 1391 - c. 1353 BC
- Predecessor: Thutmose IV
- Successor: Amenhotep IV
Royal titulary
Horus name
Ka nakht kha em maat
Kꜣ nḫt ḫˁ m mꜣˁt
"The strong bull who has appeared in truth"
G5	E1 D40 m N28 H6
Nebty name
Semen hepu segereh tawy
smn hpw sgrḥ tꜣwy
"Who has established laws and pacified the Two Lands"
G16	s mn n Y1 O4 p Z2 w s W11 r V28 a N17 N17
Golden Horus
Aa khepesh hui setjetiu
ˁꜣ-ḫpš ḥwi sṯtyw
"The great-of-strength one who has struck down the Asiatics"
G8	O29 a F23 V28 A24 S22 t G4 T14 Z3
Prenomen
Neb maat re
Nb mꜣˁt rˁ
"The possessor of the Maat of Re"
The Lord of Truth is Re

M23 X1 L2 X1	ra mAat nb
Nomen
Imen hetepu heka waset
Imn ḥtp(.w) ḥḳꜣ wꜣst
"Amun is satisfied, ruler of Thebes"

G39 N5	i mn n R4 HqA R19
- Consorts: Tiye; Gilukhipa; Tadukhipa; Sitamun; Iset
- Children: Thutmose; Amenhotep IV; Nebetah; Sitamun; Iset; Henuttaneb
- Father: Thutmose IV
- Mother: Mutemwiya
- Born: c. 1401 BC
- Died: c. 1353 BC (aged c. 48)
- Burial: WV22; Mummy found in the KV35 royal cache (Theban Necropolis)
- Monuments: Malkata; Mortuary Temple of Amenhotep III, Colossi of Memnon
- Dynasty: 18th Dynasty of Egypt

Amenhotep III (Note: (Ancient Egyptian: jmn-ḥtp(.w) Amānəḥūtpū, IPA: [ʔaˌmaːnəʔˈħutpu])) (lit. '"Amun is satisfied"'), also known as Amenhotep the Magnificent or Amenhotep the Great and Hellenized as Amenophis III (c. 1401 BC - c. 1353 BC), was the ninth pharaoh of the 18th Dynasty. According to different authors following the "Low Chronology", he ruled Ancient Egypt from June 1386 to 1349 BC, or from June 1388 BC to December 1351 BC/1350 BC, after his father Thutmose IV died. Amenhotep III was Thutmose IV's son by a minor wife, Mutemwiya.

His reign marked a time of exceptional prosperity and grandeur, during which Egypt reached the height of its artistic and international influence, making him one of ancient Egypt's greatest pharaohs. He is also one of the few pharaohs worshipped as a deity during his lifetime.

When he died in the 38th or 39th year of his reign, he was succeeded by his son Amenhotep IV, who later changed his name to Akhenaten.

== Family and early life ==
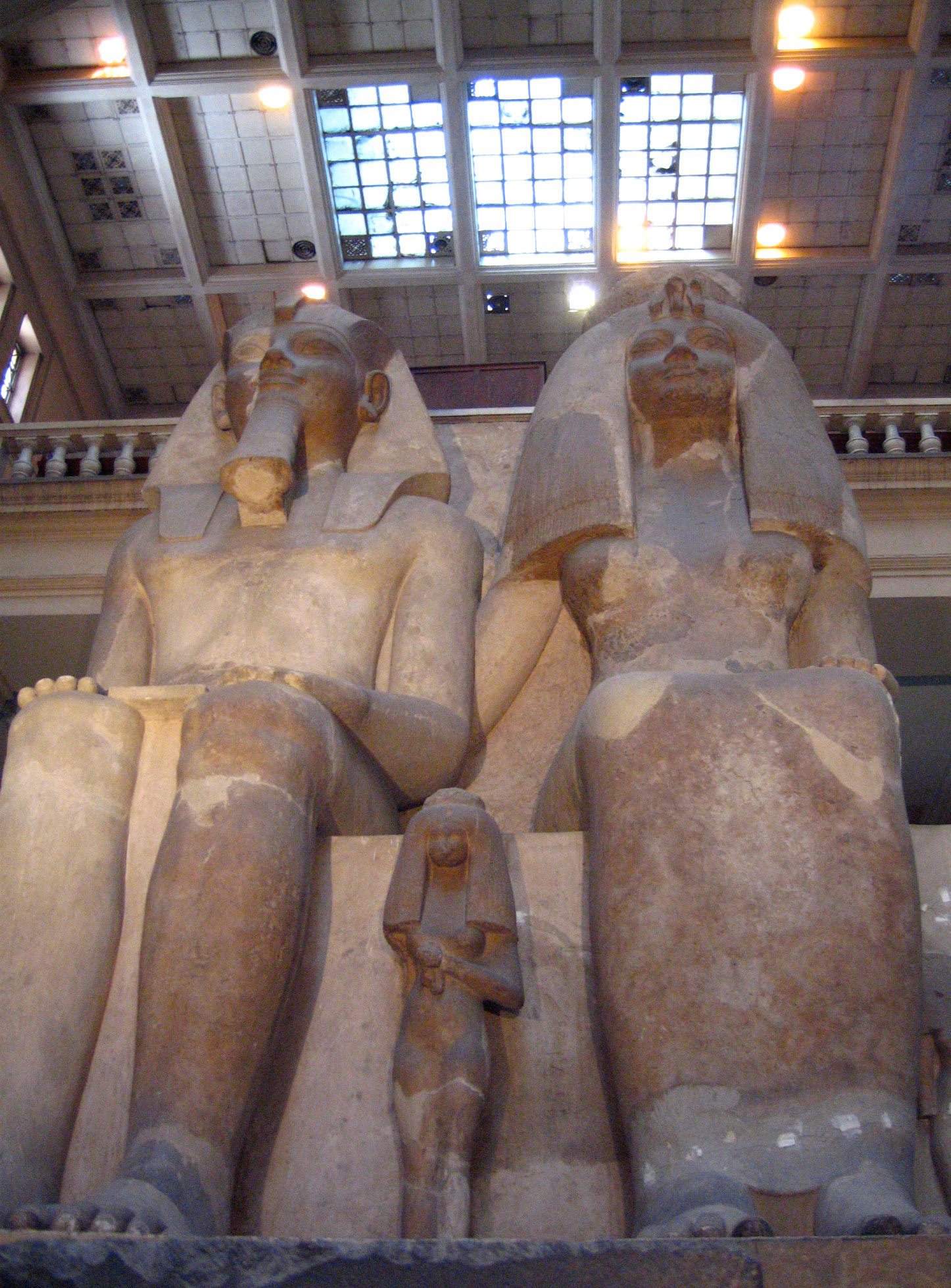
A colossal statue of Amenhotep III, Queen Tiye and Princess Henuttaneb. Egyptian Museum in Cairo, 2008.

Amenhotep III was the son of Thutmose IV and his minor wife Mutemwiya. He was born around 1401 BC. Later in his life, Amenhotep III commissioned the depiction of his divine birth to be displayed at Luxor Temple. Amenhotep III claimed that his true father was the god Amun, who had taken the form of Thutmose IV to father a child with Mutemwiya.

In Regnal Year 2, Amenhotep III married Tiye, the daughter of Yuya and Thuya. Tiye was the Great Royal Wife throughout Amenhotep III's reign. Many commemorative scarabs were commissioned and distributed during Amenhotep III's noon. On the "marriage scarabs," Amenhotep III affirmed his divine power and the legitimacy of his wife. With Tiye, Amenhotep III fathered at least two sons, Thutmose and Amenhotep IV. They also had at least 4 daughters, Sitamun, Henuttaneb, Iset, and Nebetah. Most of Amenhotep II's daughters appear frequently on statues and reliefs from his reign. However, Nebetah is attested only once, on a colossal limestone group of statues from Medinet Habu, and Beketaten only appears in Amarna.

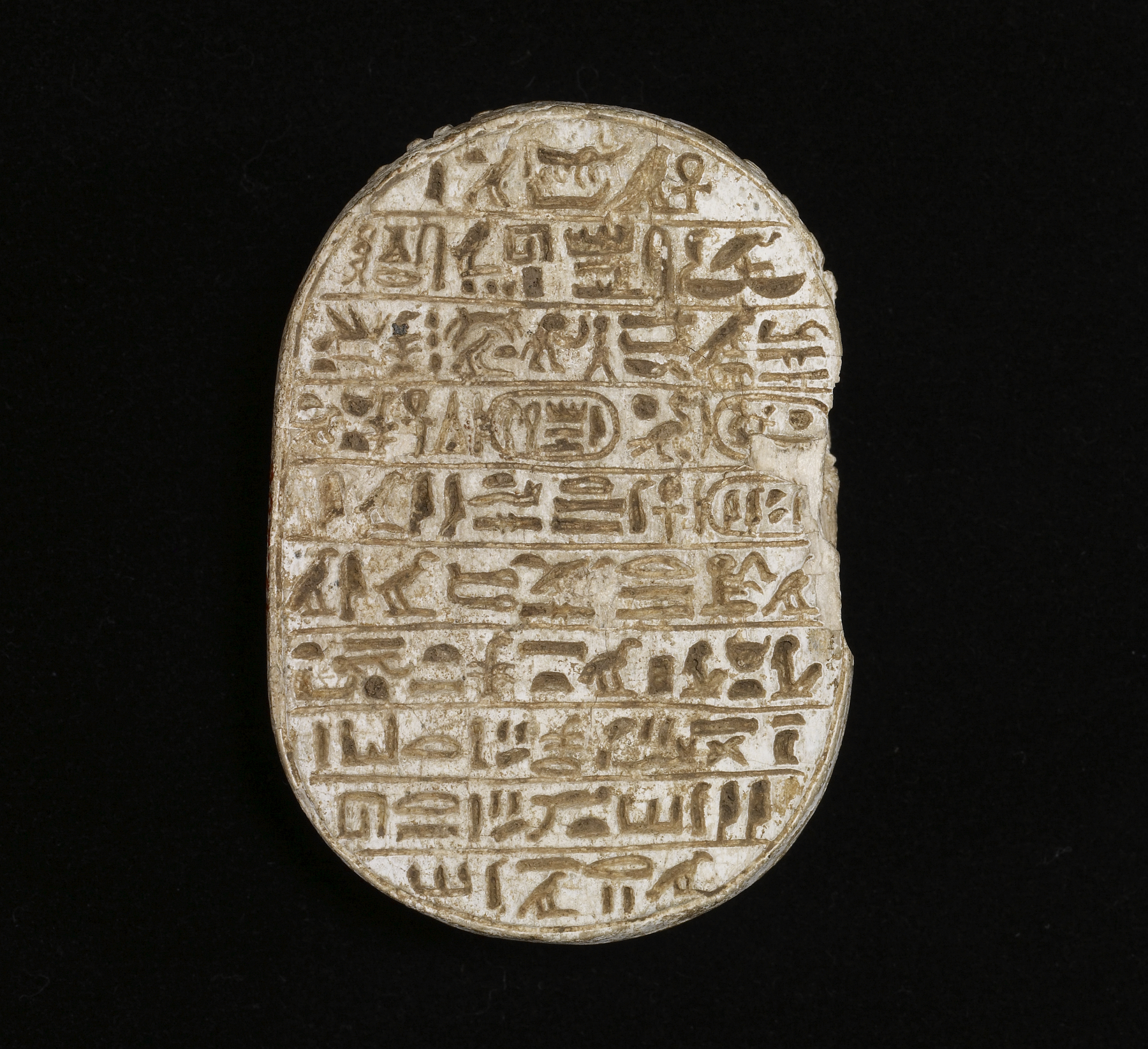
One of the many commemorative "marriage scarabs" of Amenhotep, which affirm the divine power of the king and the legitimacy of his wife, Tiye. Walters Art Museum, Baltimore.

Amenhotep III is also sometimes credited as the father of Smenkhkare or Tutankhamun, with varying proposals for their mothers, but these theories are not as accepted as his other, known children.

In addition to Tiye, Amenhotep had several other wives. In Regnal Year 10, Amenhotep III married Gilukhipa, the daughter of Shuttarna II of Mitanni. He later married Tadukhipa, daughter of Tushratta of Mitanni, in or around Regnal Year 36 of his reign. Other wives, whose names are unknown, included: a daughter of Kurigalzu, king of Babylon; a daughter of Kadashman-Enlil, king of Babylon; a daughter of Tarhundaradu, ruler of Arzawa; and a daughter of the ruler of Ammia.

Finally, he married at least two of his daughters, Sitamun and Iset, in the last decade of his reign. Jar-label inscriptions from Regnal Year 30 indicate that Sitamun was elevated to the status of Great Royal Wife by that time. Although shunned by common Egyptians, incest was not uncommon among royalty. A sculpture restored by Amenhotep III for his grandfather, Amenhotep II, shows Sitamun with a young prince beside her. This has led to theories that Sitamun was the mother of Smenkhkare and/or Tutankhamun.

== Life and reign ==
Amenhotep III probably became pharaoh when he was between the ages of 6 and 12. While it is likely that a regent would have ruled until he came of age, none is attested in the surviving records. In Regnal Year 11, Amenhotep III commanded the construction of a Reservoir at Tiye's hometown of Djakaru. He then celebrated a Festival of Opening the Lake in the third month of Inundation, day 16, and rowed the royal barge Aten-tjehen on the lake. This event was commemorated on at least eleven commemorative scarabs.

From other scarabs, Amenhotep III is known to have killed either 102 or 110 lions in the first 10 years of his reign.

=== Battle participation ===
Amenhotep III is known to have participated in only one military campaign. In Regnal Year Five, he led a victorious campaign against a rebellion in Kush. At the time, Amenhotep III would have been between 11 and 17 years old. This victory was commemorated by three rock-carved stelae found near Aswan and Saï in Nubia. The official account of Amenhotep's military victory emphasizes his martial prowess with the hyperbole typical of the period.

=== Court of Amenhotep III ===
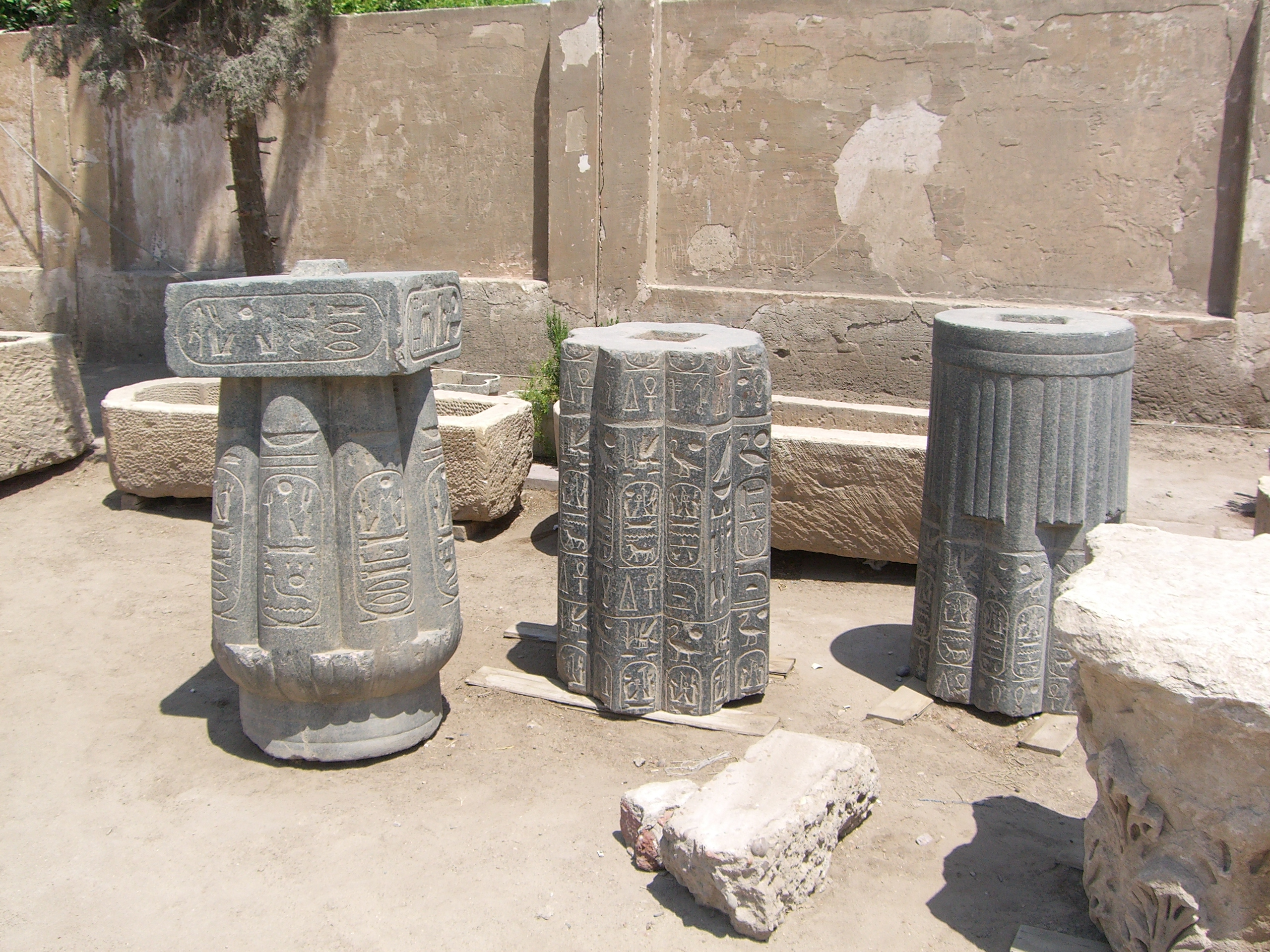
Papyraform columns with the names of Amenhotep III - XVIII dynasty, Merenptah - 19th dynasty and Sethnakht - 20th dynasty - New Kingdom Neithsabes

There is a significant attestation for the court officials who served during Amenhotep's reign, primarily through the discovery of their tombs in the Theban Necropolis. Among these court officials were the viziers Ramose, Amenhotep, Aperel, and Ptahmose. Other officials included the treasurers Ptahmose and Merire; the high stewards, Amenemhat Surer and Amenhotep (Huy); and the Viceroy of Kush, Merimose.

Amenhotep held many offices during the reign of Amenhotep the pharaoh, but is best known for receiving the right to build his mortuary temple behind that of the king. Amenhotep was deified after his death and was one of the few non-royals to be worshiped in such a manner.

=== Malkata Palace ===
The palace of Malkata was built in the 14th century BC and its ancient name was Per-Hay, "House of Rejoicing". The Malakata palace was known as the Tjehen-Aten or "the City of the dazzling Aten" or Sun Disk under Amenhotep III. Built mostly out of mud-brick, it was Amenhotep's residence throughout most of the later part of his reign. Construction began around Regnal Year 11 and continued until the king moved to the palace permanently around Regnal Year 29. Once completed, it was the largest royal residence in Egypt.

=== Atenism ===
Amenhotep III adopted the royal epithet "Aten-Tjehen", which means "the Dazzling Sun Disk", in his 30th Regnal Year, showing his increased interest in the Aten god and elevated it from a minor god to the solar disc by giving it royal patronage. Unlike his son, Amenhotep IV, Amenhotep III did not promote the Aten as an exclusive god in his own reign and his main religious devotion was still towards Amun-Ra, a combination of Thebes' deity Amun and the northern Egyptian sun god Ra in his reign...even if he did name "a royal boat as well as a Theban palace after Aten" (known as Malkata) and named his youngest daughter by his great royal wife Tiye with the name Beketaten meaning 'Handmaid of Aten'.

=== Sed festivals ===
Amenhotep III celebrated three Sed festivals in Regnal Years 30, 34, and 37, each at Malkata palace in Western Thebes. A temple of Amun and festival hall were built especially for the celebrations. The Sed festival was a tradition that dated to the Old Kingdom, consisting of a series of tests that demonstrated the pharaoh's fitness for continuing as ruler of Egypt. Based on indications left by Queen Tiye's steward Khenruef, the festival may have lasted two to eight months.

Amenhotep III wanted his Sed Festivals to be far more spectacular than those of the past. He appointed Amenhotep to plan the ceremony, potentially because he was one of the few courtiers still alive to have served at the last Sed Festival, held for Amenhotep II. In preparation for the first Sed Festival, Amenhotep enlisted scribes to gather information from records and inscriptions, most found in ancient funerary temples, describing the appropriate rituals and costumes.

Temples were built and statues erected up and down the Nile River. Craftsmen and jewelers created ornaments commentating the event including jewelry, ornaments, and stelae. The scribe Nebmerutef coordinated every step of the event. He directed Amenhotep to use his mace to knock on the temple doors. Beside him, Amenhotep-Hapu mirrored his effort like a royal shadow. The king was followed by Queen Tiye and the royal daughters. When moving to another venue, the banner of the jackal god Wepwawet, "Opener of Ways" preceded the King. The king changed his costume at each major activity of the celebration.

One of the major highlights of the festival was the king's dual coronation. He was enthroned separately for Upper and Lower Egypt. For Upper Egypt, Amenhotep III wore the white crown but changed to the red crown for the Lower Egypt coronation.

After the Sed festival, Amenhotep III transcended from being a near-god to one divine. The king may have later traveled across Egypt following the festival, potentially reenacting the ceremony for different audiences. Few Egyptian kings lived long enough for their own celebration. Those who survived used the celebration as the affirmation of transition to divinity.

=== International relations ===
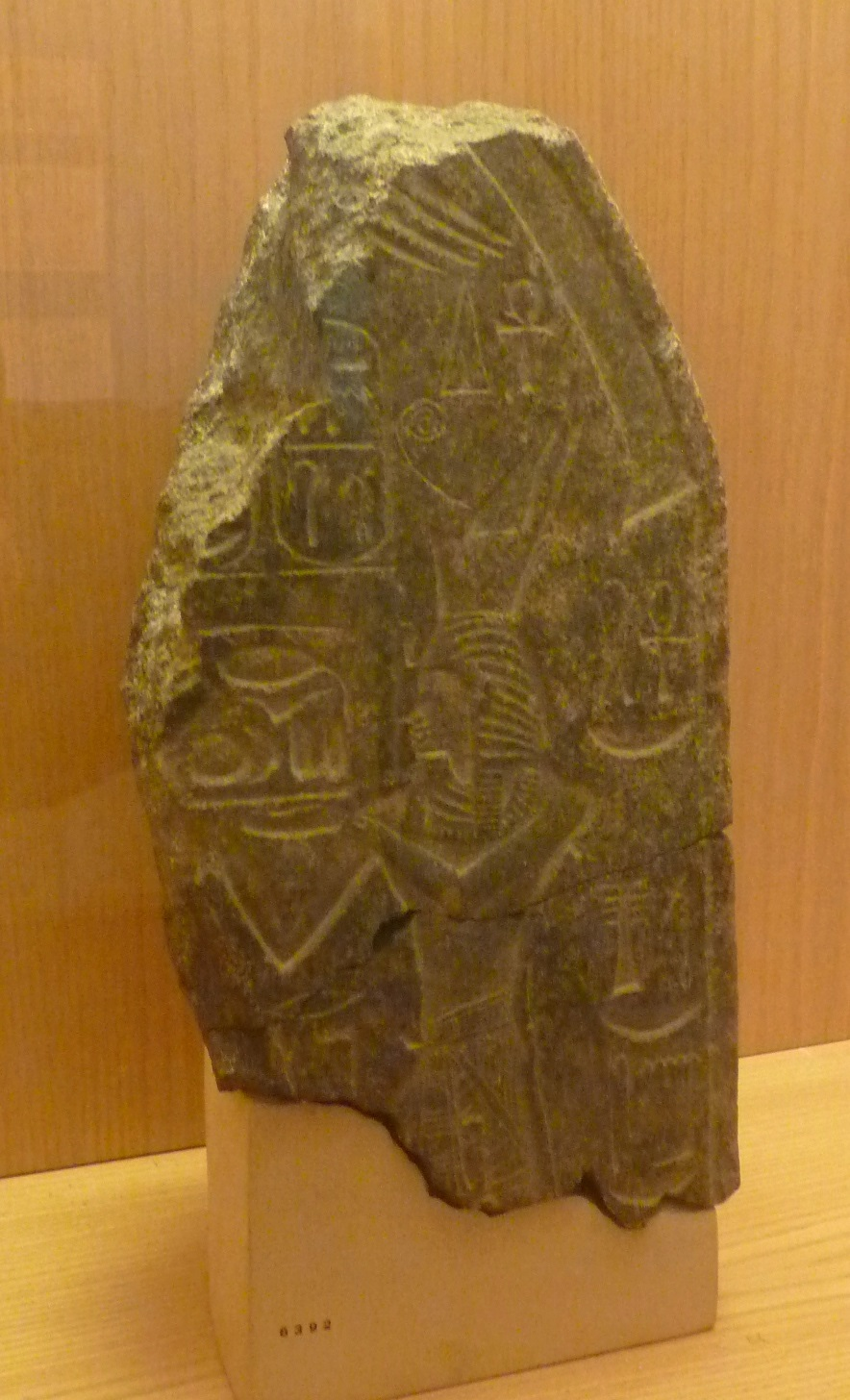
Fragment of a votive stele depicting Amenhotep III making an offering to an unpreserved god. Reign of Amenhotep III, 18th dynasty, New Kingdom.

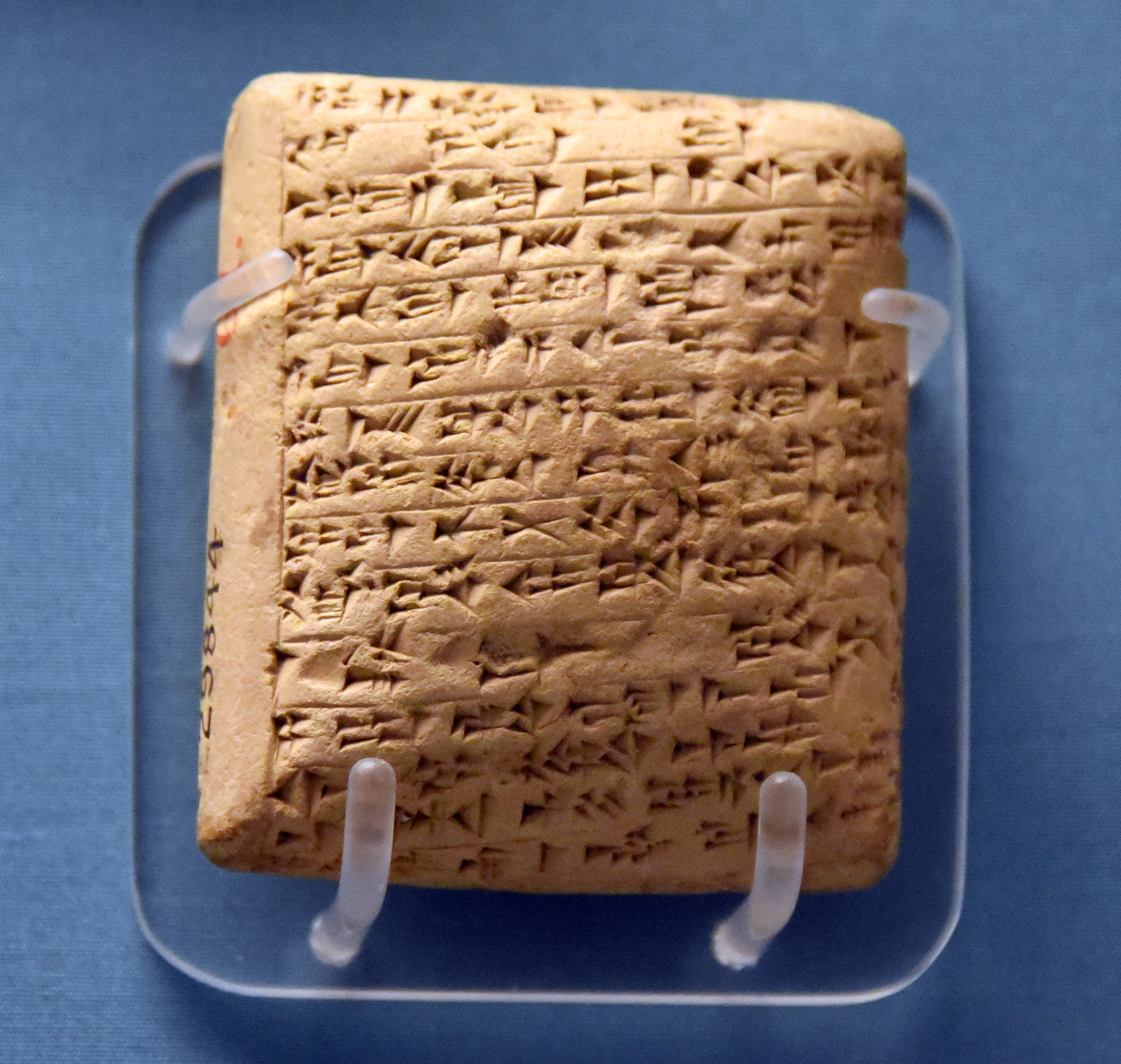
Amarna letter. Letter from Labayu (ruler of Shechem) to the Egyptian Pharaoh Amenhotep III or his son Akhenaten. 14th century BCE. From Tell el-Amarna, Egypt.

Diplomatic correspondence from Amenhotep III's reign are partially preserved in the Amarna Letters, a collection of documents found near the city of Amarna. The letters come from the rulers of Assyria, Mitanni, Babylon, Hatti, and other states, typically including requests by those rulers for gold and other gifts from Amenhotep III. The letters cover the period from Year 30 of Amenhotep III until at least the end of Amenhotep IV's reign. In Amarna Letter EA 4, Amenhotep III is quoted by the Babylonian king Kadashman-Enlil I in firmly rejecting the latter's entreaty to marry one of this pharaoh's daughters:

From time immemorial, no daughter of the king of Egy[pt] is given to anyone.

Amenhotep III's refusal to allow one of his daughters to be married to the Babylonian monarch may indeed have followed from Egyptian royal custom, which allowed a claim upon the throne through descent from a royal princess. It could also be viewed as a diplomatic stratagem to enhance Egypt's prestige, as Amenhotep himself married the daughters of several foreign rulers while refusing them his own daughters.

The Amarna Letters also reference the exchange between Amenhotep and the Mitanni King Tushratta of the statue of a healing goddess, Ishtar of Nineveh, late in Amenhotep III's reign. Scholars have generally assumed that the statue's sojourn to Egypt was requested by Amenhotep in order to cure him of his various ailments, which included painful abscesses in his teeth. However, William Moran's analysis of Amarna Letter EA 23, relating to the dispatch of the statue to Thebes, discounts this theory.

The arrival of the statue is known to have coincided with Amenhotep's marriage with Tadukhipa, Tushratta's daughter, in the pharaoh's 36th year; letter EA 23's arrival in Egypt is dated to "regnal year 36, the fourth month of winter, day 1" of his reign. Furthermore, Tushratta never mentions in EA 23 that the statue's dispatch was meant to heal Amenhotep of his maladies. Instead, Tushratta writes in part:

... Thus Šauška of Nineveh, mistress of all lands: "I wish to go to Egypt, a country that I love, and then return." Now I herewith send her, and she is on her way. Now, in the time, too, of my father,...[she] went to this country, and just as earlier she dwelt there and they honored her, may my brother now honor her 10 times more than before. May my brother honor her, [then] at [his] pleasure let her go so that she may come back. May Šauška (i.e., Ishtar), the mistress of heaven, protect us, my brother and me, a 100,000 years, and may our mistress grant both of us great joy. And let us act as friends. Is Šauška for me alone my god[dess], and for my brother not his god[dess]?

The likeliest explanation is that the statue was sent to Egypt "to shed her blessings on the wedding of Amenhotep and Tadukhepa, as she had been sent previously for Amenhotep and Gilukhepa." Moran agrees that this explanation was more likely. Further, Moran argues that the contents of Amarna Letter EA 21 support this claim, wherein Tushratta asks the gods, including Ishtar, for their blessing of the marriage.

In the 14th century BC, the pharaoh sent an expedition to Cyprus to establish Egyptian control over the island, which was subsequently maintained for several centuries. During this time, the Egyptians established a number of settlements on the island, and they exported copper and other raw materials from Cyprus to Egypt in exchange for luxury goods and other commodities. However, the Egyptian presence on Cyprus was at times interrupted by incursions of other powers, including the Hittites and the Mycenaeans.

== Succession ==
Thutmose, the eldest son of Amenhotep III with his wife Tiye, became Crown Prince, but died before his father. Amenhotep was ultimately succeeded by his second son, who ascended the throne as Amenhotep IV and later took the name Akhenaten.

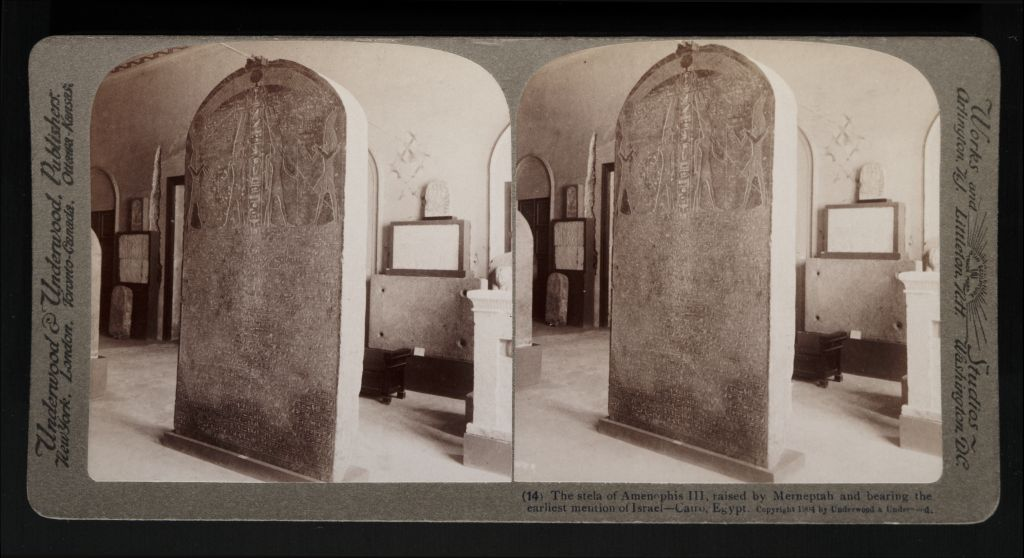
Obverse: The Stela of Amenhotep. back: raised by Merenptah (1213–1203 a.c.) Egyptian Museum.

=== Proposed coregency with Amenhotep IV ===
It has long been theorized that Amenhotep III shared a coregency with his son Amenhotep IV. Lawrence Berman has claimed that proponents of the coregency theory tended to be art historians, while historians remained unconvinced.

Eric Cline, Nicholas Reeves, Peter Dorman, and other scholars argue strongly against the establishment of a long coregency between the two rulers and in favor of either no coregency or one of at most two years. Donald Redford, William Murnane, Alan Gardiner, and Lawrence Berman contest the view of any coregency whatsoever between Amenhotep IV and his father.

Evidence against a coregency includes Amarna Letter EA 27, which is dated to Regnal Year 2 of Amenhotep IV. The subject of the letter involves a complaint from the Mitannian king Tushratta, claiming that Amenhotep IV did not honor his father's promise to send Tushratta gold statues as part of the marriage arrangement between Tadukhipa and Amenhotep III. This correspondence implies that if any coregency occurred between Amenhotep III and Amenhotep IV, it lasted no more than a year.

In February 2014, Egyptian Ministry of Antiquities announced that findings from the tomb of Vizier Amenhotep-Huy gave "conclusive evidence" of a coregency that lasted at least eight years. In the tomb, the cartouches of the two pharaohs were carved side by side. However, this conclusion has since been called into question by other Egyptologists, according to whom the inscription means only that construction on Amenhotep-Huy's tomb started during Amenhotep III's reign and ended under Akhenaten's, and Amenhotep-Huy thus simply wanted to pay his respects to both rulers, carving their names separately rather than simultaneously.

== Later life ==
=== Health and death ===
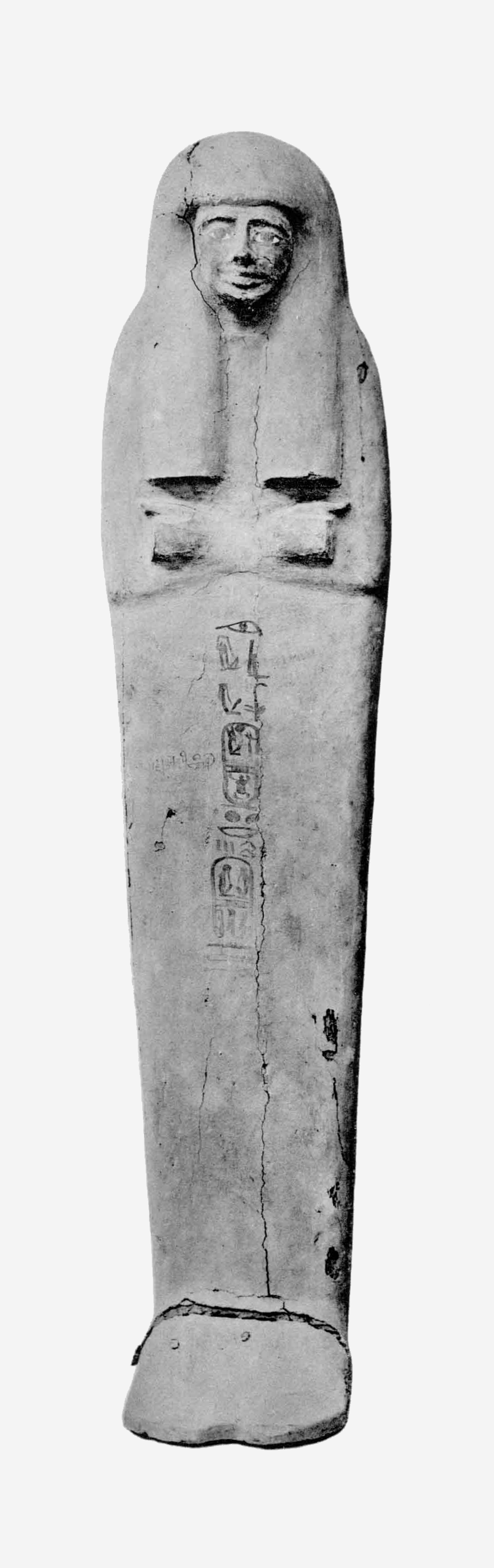
Coffin of Amenhotep III

Amenhotep III's greatest attested regnal date is Year 38, which appears on wine jar-label dockets from Malkata. He may have lived briefly into an unrecorded Year 39 and died before the wine harvest of that year. Reliefs from the wall of the temple of Soleb in Nubia and scenes from the Theban tomb of Kheruef, Steward of the King's Great Wife, Tiye, depict Amenhotep III as a visibly weak and sick figure. Scientists believe that in his final years he suffered from arthritis and obesity. Further, a forensic examination of his mummy revealed worn and cavity-pitted teeth which must have inflicted constant pain. An examination of the mummy by the Australian anatomist Grafton Smith concluded that the pharaoh had died between the age of 40 and 50.

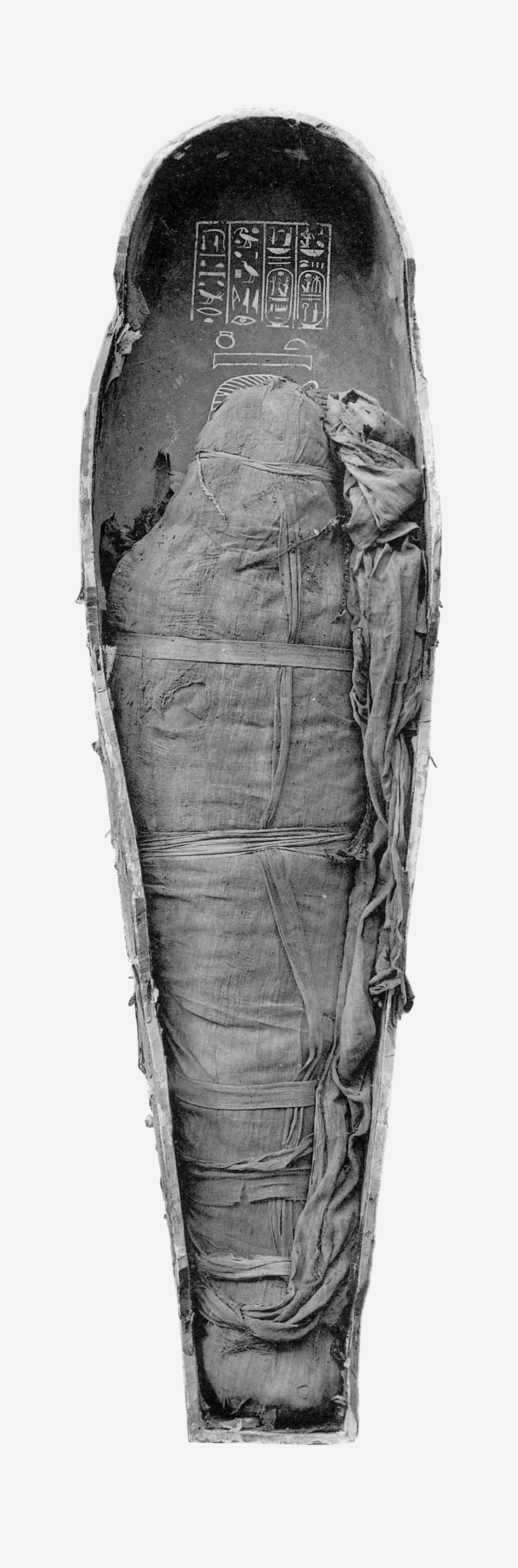
The mummy of Amenhotep III before unwrapping

He was survived by at least one child, his successor Amenhotep IV. His wife Tiye is known to have outlived him by at least 12 years, as she is mentioned in several Amarna letters dated from her son's reign, as well as depicted at the royal dinner table in Amenhotep IV's years 9 and 12, in scenes from the tomb of Huya.

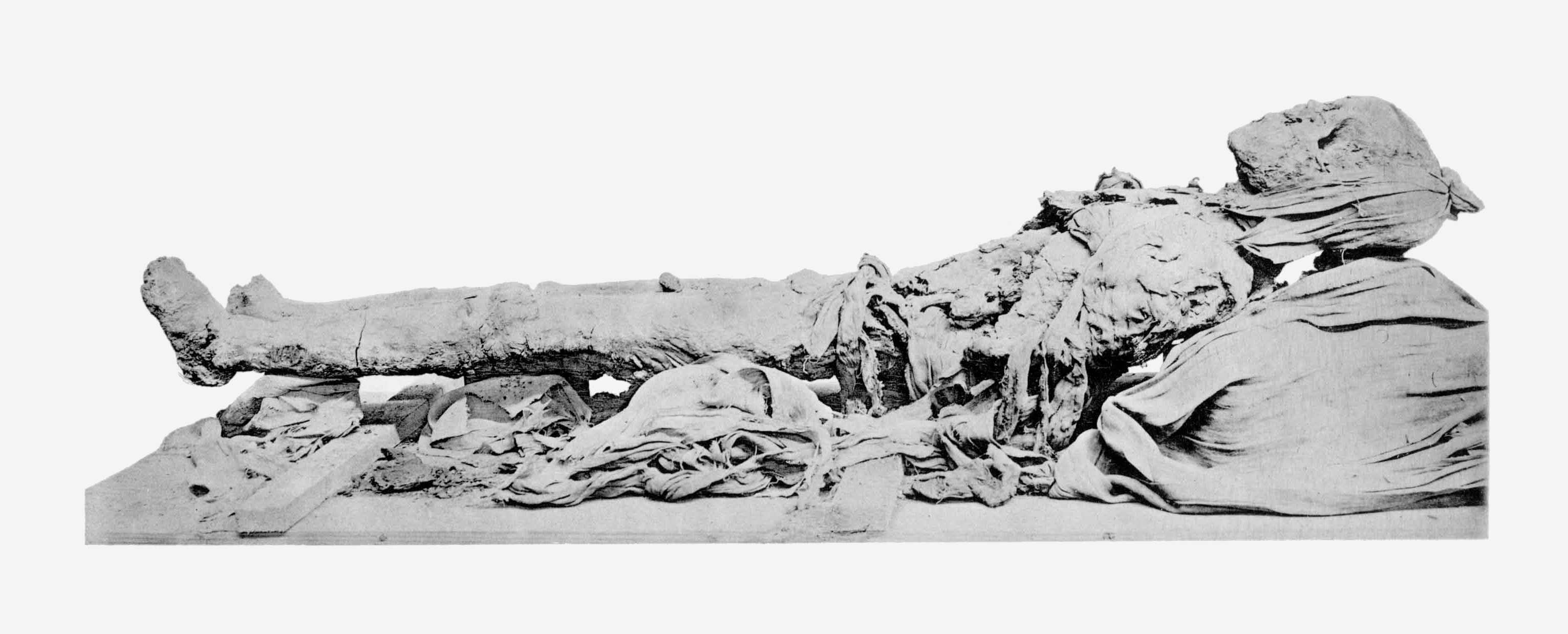
The mummy of Amenhotep III during unwrapping

Foreign leaders communicated their grief at the pharaoh's death, with Tushratta saying:

When I heard that my brother Nimmureya had gone to his fate, on that day I sat down and wept. On that day I took no food, I took no water.

=== Burial and mummy ===
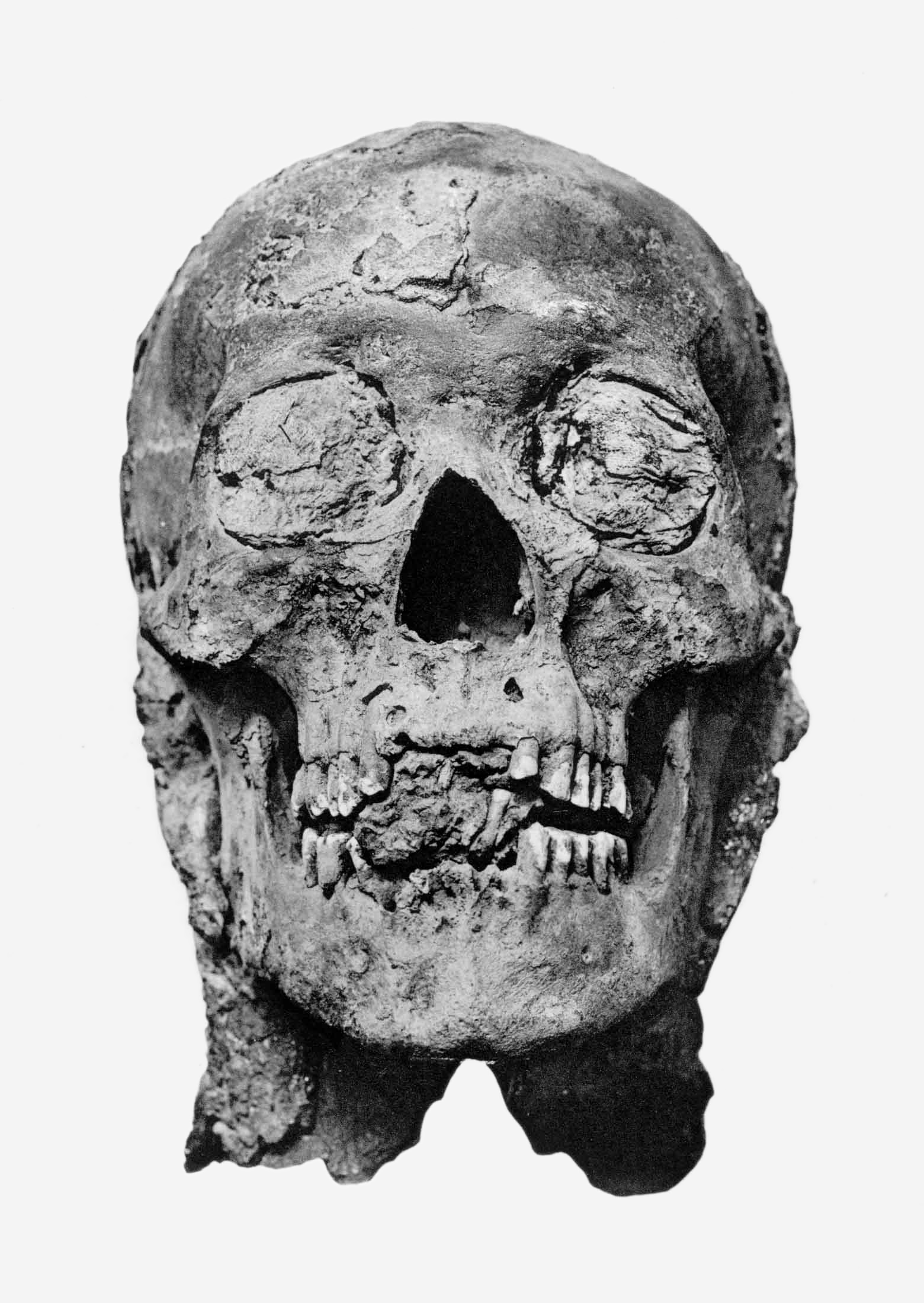
Mummified head of Amenhotep III following unwrapping

Amenhotep was buried in tomb WV22 in the Western Valley of the Valley of the Kings outside of Thebes. The tomb is the largest in the West Valley of the Kings and includes two side chambers for his Great Royal Wives, Tiye and Sitamun. However, it does not seem that either woman was buried there. During the reign of Smendes in the Third Intermediate Period, Amenhotep III's mummy was later moved to the mummy cache in KV35 along with several other pharaohs of the 18th and 19th Dynasties, where it lay until discovered by Victor Loret in 1898.

For the 18th dynasty, the mummy shows an unusually heavy use of subcutaneous stuffing to make the mummy look more lifelike. The mummy has museum inventory number CG 61074.

In April 2021, his mummy was moved from the Egyptian Museum to the National Museum of Egyptian Civilization, along with those of 17 other kings and 4 queens in an event termed the Pharaohs' Golden Parade.

== Monuments and legacy ==
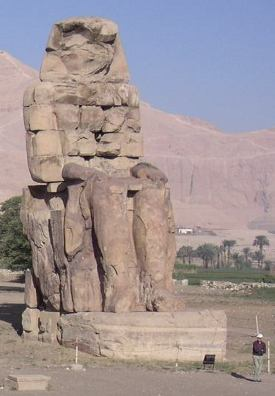
The northern Colossus of Memnon

Amenhotep III has the distinction of having the most surviving statues of any Egyptian pharaoh, with over 250 identified. These statues provide a series of portraits covering the entire length of his reign.

When Amenhotep III died, he left behind an internationally respected country at the height of its power and influence. However, it was also a country wedded to age-old political and religious certainties under the Amun priesthood.

The resulting upheavals from his son Amenhotep IV's reforming zeal shook these old certainties to their foundations, and forced the momentous question whether a pharaoh was more powerful than his society as represented in the worship of Amun. Akhenaten even moved the capital away from Thebes, the center of Amun's worship, and built Amarna, a city dedicated to his new deity, the Aten.

Amenhotep III built extensively at the temple of Karnak, including the Luxor temple with two pylons, a colonnade behind the new temple entrance, and a new temple to the goddess Ma'at. Amenhotep dismantled the Fourth Pylon of the Temple of Amun at Karnak to construct a new Third Pylon — and created a new entrance to this structure where he erected two rows of columns with open papyrus capitals down the centre of this newly formed forecourt. The forecourt between the Third and Fourth Pylons, sometimes called an obelisk court, was also decorated with scenes of the sacred funerary barques of the deities Amun, Mut, and Khonsu. The king also started work on the 10th Pylon at the Temple of Amun. Amenhotep III's first recorded act as king — in his Years 1 and 2 — was to open new limestone quarries at Tura, just south of Cairo and at Dayr al-Barsha in Middle Egypt to undertake his great building projects. He virtually covered Nubia with new monuments:

...including a small temple with a colonnade (dedicated to Thutmose III) at Elephantine, a rock temple dedicated to Amun "Lord of the Ways" at Wadi es-Sebuam, and the temple of Horus of Miam at Aniba...[as well as founding] additional temples at Kawa and Sesebi.

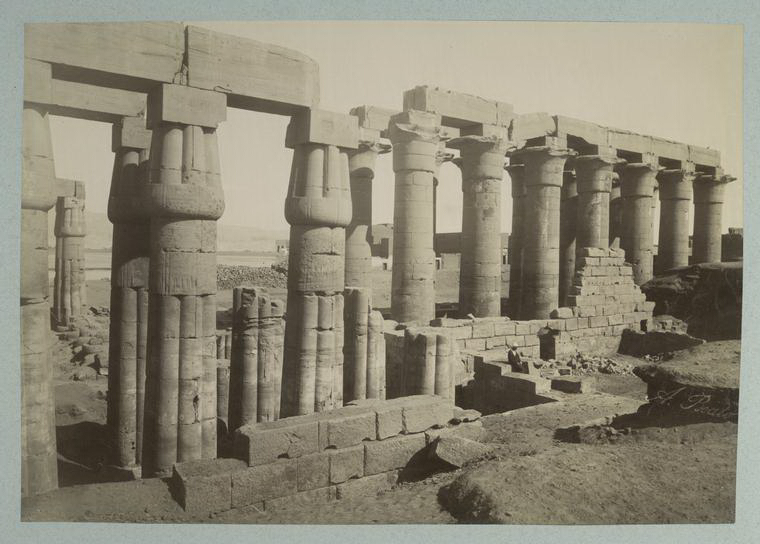
Luxor Temple of Amenhotep

His enormous mortuary temple on the west bank of the Nile River was, in its day, the largest religious complex in Thebes, but the king built too close to the floodplain, and less than two hundred years later it was reduced to ruins. Much of the masonry was purloined by Merneptah and later pharaohs for their own construction projects. All that remained standing was the gateway with the Colossi of Memnon — two massive stone statues depicting Amenhotep,18 m (59 ft) high. Amenhotep also built the Third Pylon at Karnak and erected 600 statues of the goddess Sekhmet in the Temple of Mut to the south. Some of the most magnificent statues of New Kingdom Egypt date to his reign "such as the two outstanding couchant rose granite lions originally set before the temple at Soleb in Nubia" as well as a large series of royal sculptures. Several black granite seated statues of Amenhotep wearing the nemes headress have come from excavations behind the Colossi of Memnon as well as from Tanis in the Delta. In 2014, two giant statues of Amenhotep III toppled by an earthquake around 1200 BC were reconstructed from more than 200 fragments and re-erected at the northern gate of the king's funerary temple.

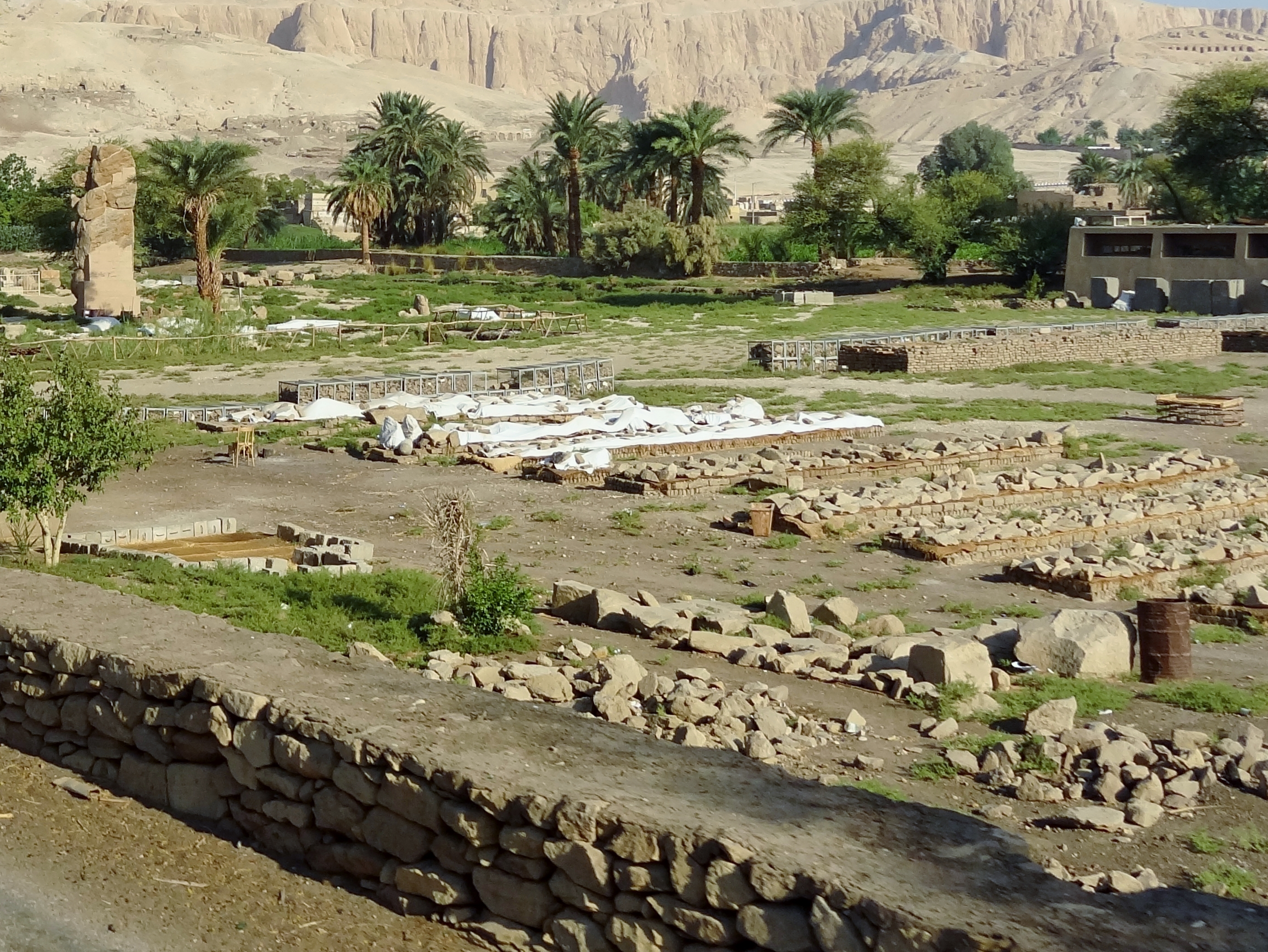
Remains of Kom el-Hettan (mortuary temple of Amenhotep III)

One of the most stunning finds of royal statues dating to his reign was made as recently as 1989 in the courtyard of Amenhotep III's colonnade of the Temple of Luxor. The cache of statues included a nearly undamaged 6 feet (1.8 m)-high pink quartzite statue of the king wearing the Double Crown. It was mounted on a sled, and may have been a cult statue. Only the name of the god Amun had been hacked out wherever it appeared in the pharaoh's cartouche, clearly part of Akhenaten's campaign against the god of his father.

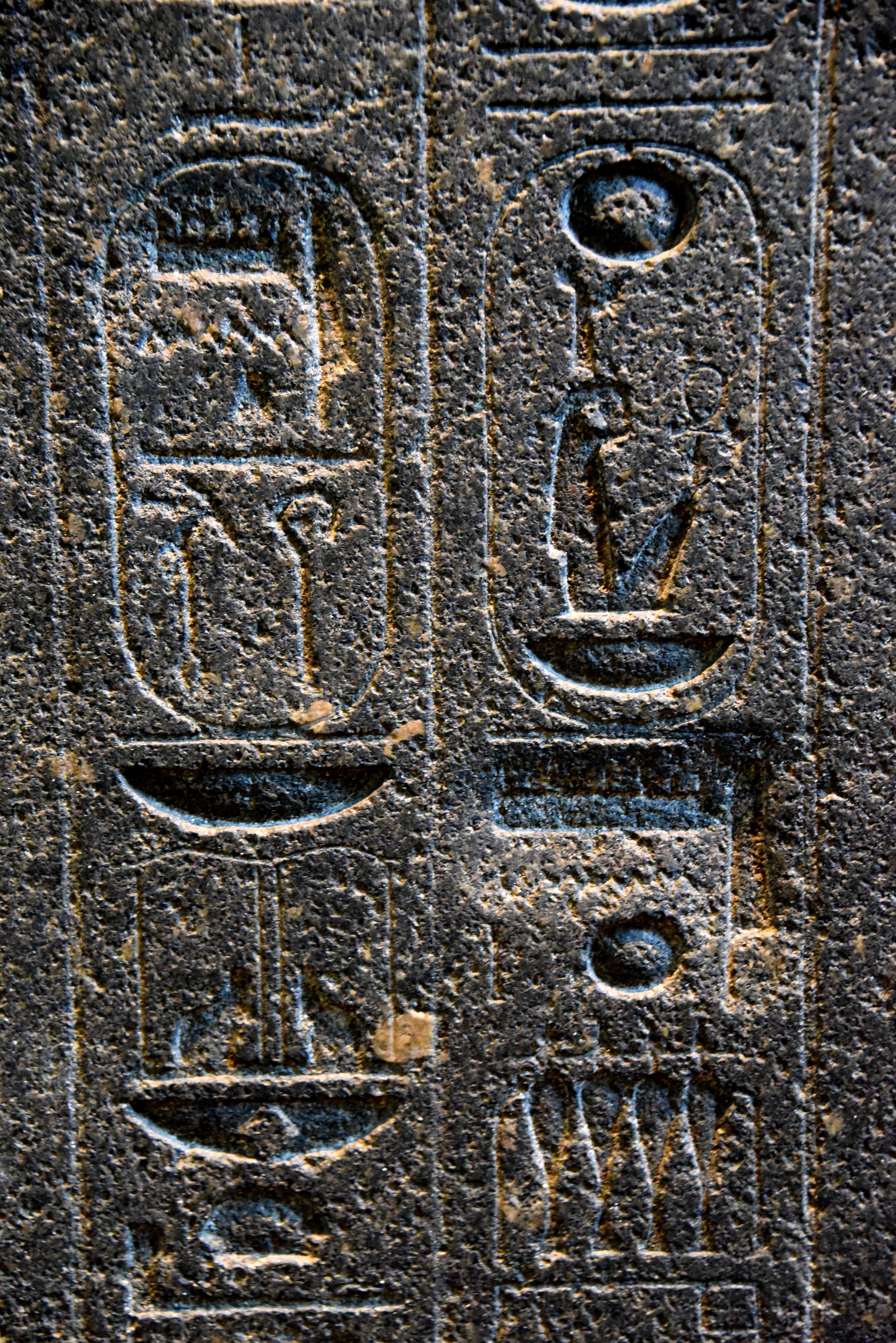
Hieroglyphs on the backpillar of Amenhotep 's statue. There are 2 places where Akhenaten erased the name Amun, later restored on a deeper surface. The British Museum, London

One of Amenhotep III's most popular epithets was Aten-tjehen which means "the Dazzling Sun Disk"; it appears in his titulary at Luxor temple and was frequently used as the name for one of his palaces, and for the Year 11 royal barge, as well as for a company of Amenhotep's army.

In 2021, excavations revealed a settlement near Amenhotep's mortuary temple, called the Dazzling Aten, believed to have been built by king to house craftsmen and labourers working on royal projects at Thebes, along with its own bakery and cemetery.

A Sed Festival Stela of Amenhotep III was taken from Egypt to Europe by an art dealer. Once owned by Eric Cassirer, it is now believed to be in a private collection in the United States. The white alabaster stela is 10 cm × 9 cm (3.9 in × 3.5 in), but only its upper half survived. Front view: The god Heh, representing the number 1 million, holds notched palm leaves signifying years and the cartouche of Amenhotep III, symbolically raising the pharaoh for a million years. Side view: A series of festival (ḥb) emblems together with a Sed (sd) emblem identifying the stela as one made for Amenhotep 's Sed Festival royal jubilee. Top and back view: These show malicious damage where the cartouche was chipped away. Cassirer suggests this was another example of Akhenaten's vandalism against Amun. Other gods displayed on the stela, Re and Ma'at, showed no damage. The altered stela may then have been displayed by Akhenaten.

== Attestations ==
A striking characteristic of Amenhotep's reign is the series of over 200 large commemorative stone scarabs that have been discovered over a large geographic area ranging from Syria (Ras Shamra) through to Soleb in Nubia. Similarly, five other scarabs state that his wife Gilukhepa of Mitanni arrived in Egypt with a retinue of 317 women. She was the first of many such princesses who would enter the pharaoh's family.

- At Akko, a clay plaque stamped with the cartouche and a silver ring found in Tomb B3, with LH IIIA1-2 pottery.
- At Panaztepe, in İzmir, a scarab found with contemporary LH IIIA pottery.
- At Mycenae, several faience plaques in secondary LH IIIB contexts.

== Ancestry ==
Ancestors of Amenhotep III

Thutmose III
Amenhotep II
Merytre-Hatshepsut
Thutmose IV
Tiaa
Amenhotep III
Mutemwiya

Genetic analysis has confirmed that Amenhotep III is the father of both the KV55 mummy, identified in the study as Akhenaten, and "The Younger Lady", sibling parents of his grandson, Tutankhamun. A more recent study, published in 2020, traced the family lineage via Y-chromosomes and mtDNA. Although only a partial profile was obtained, he shares his YDNA haplogroup, R1b, with his son and grandson, upholding the family tree outlined in the earlier study. However, the specific clade of R1b was not determined. The mitochondrial haplogroup of Amenhotep III was found to be H2b, which is associated with migrations from the Pontic-Caspian steppe to South Asia and the spread of Indo-Iranian languages.

In 2022, S.O.Y. Keita analysed 8 Short Tandem loci (STR) published data from studies by Hawass et al. 2010;2012 which sought to determine familial relations and research pathological features such as potential infectious diseases among the New Kingdom royal mummies, including Tutankhamun, Amenhotep III, and Rameses III. Keita used the Popaffiliator algorithm which differentiates Eurasians, Sub-Saharan Africans, and East Asians; he concluded that "a majority [have] an affinity with 'Sub-Saharan' Africans in one affinity analysis". However, he emphasized the complexity of ethnic attributions, cautioning that the royal mummies may have had other affiliations obscured by the typological categories, and that different "data and algorithms might give different results".

According to historian William Stiebling and archaeologist Susan N. Helft, conflicting DNA analyses by different research teams have thus far failed to establish consensus on the genetic makeup of the ancient Egyptians and their geographic origins.

In 2025, biochemist Jean-Philippe Gourdine reviewed genetic data on the Ancient Egyptian populations in the international scholarly publication, General History of Africa Volume IX. Expanding on a previous STR analysis co-performed with Keita, on the Amarna royal mummies which included Amenhotep III, Gourdine stated the analysis had found “that they had strong affinities with current sub-Saharan populations: 41 per cent to 93.9 per cent for sub-Saharan Africa, compared to 4.6 per cent to 41 per cent for Eurasia and 0.3 per cent to 16 per cent for Asia (Gourdine, 2018).” He also referenced comparable analysis conducted by DNA Tribes company, which specialized in genetic genealogy and had large datasets, with the latter having identified strong affinities between the Amarna royal mummies and Sub-Saharan African populations.

In 2025, Christopher Ehret, David Schoenbrun, Steven A Brandt and Shomarka Keita issued a multidisciplinary review, noting the R1b M89 haplogroup subtype identified among the three Amarna pharaohs (Tutankhamun, Amenhotep III and Akhenaten) was not further specified. The authors also stated that the R1b haplogroup usually interpreted as indicating a back migration to Africa from or via the Near East could have been attributed to Asian back migration or trans-Saharan connections as the genetic marker is found at relative high frequencies among Chadic populations. Referencing a Short Tandem Repeat (STR) autosomal background analysis on the Amarna royal mummies, performed by Keita in an earlier publication, the authors considered this analysis could suggest closer trans-Saharan connections. Ehret et al also disclosed through personal communication with the Gad team that "other eighteenth dynasty lineages in the Amarna period were found to be E1b1a (Gad et al 2020)". The authors further postulated that association of the palaeolithic Asian lineage (R1B) and an affiliation that is tropical African (E1b1a) is an example of admixture found in some Nile Valley populations, and that a mixture of lineages could illustrate Egypt being near a crossroads.

== Gallery ==
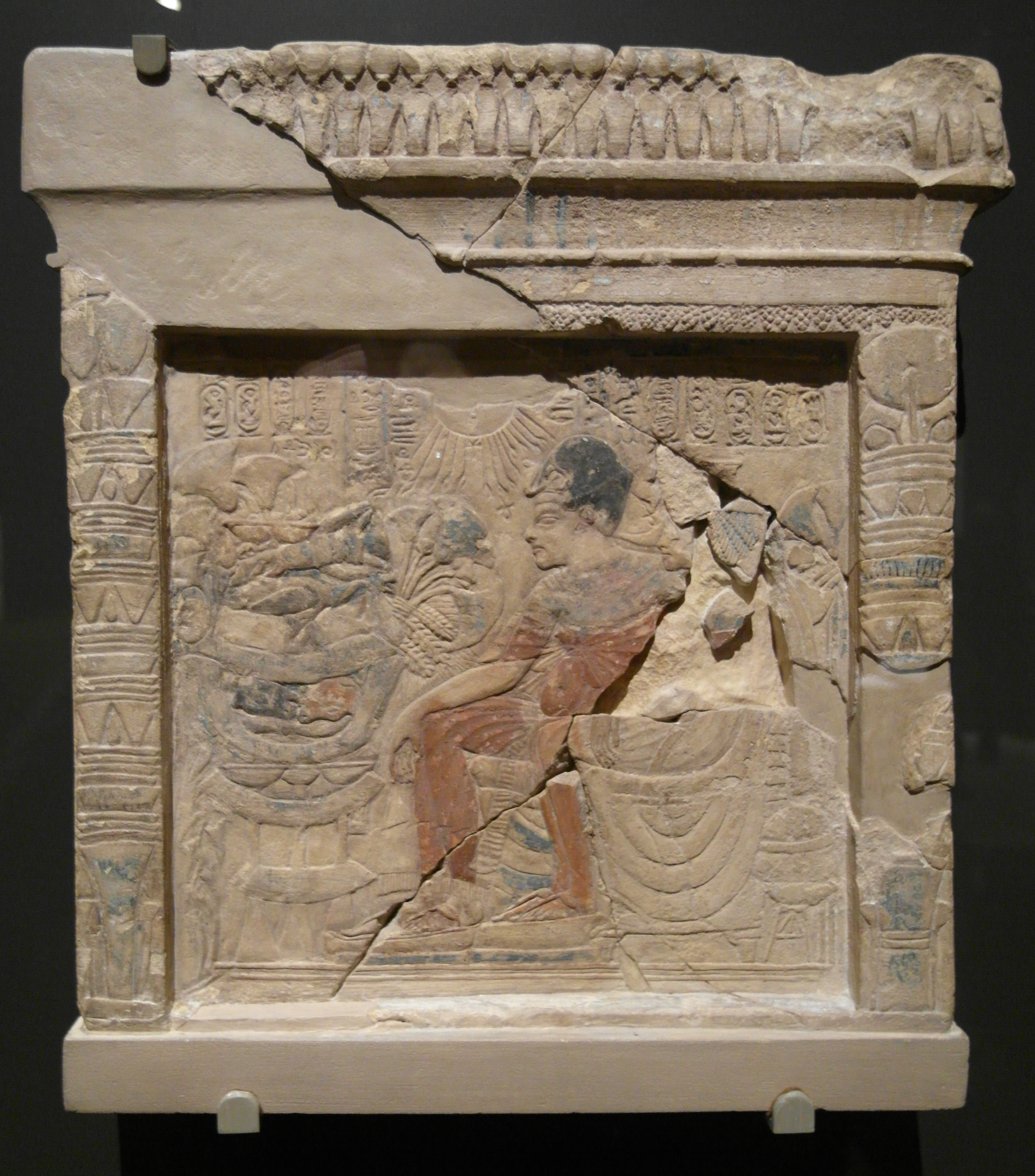
Amenhotep III and Queen Tiye

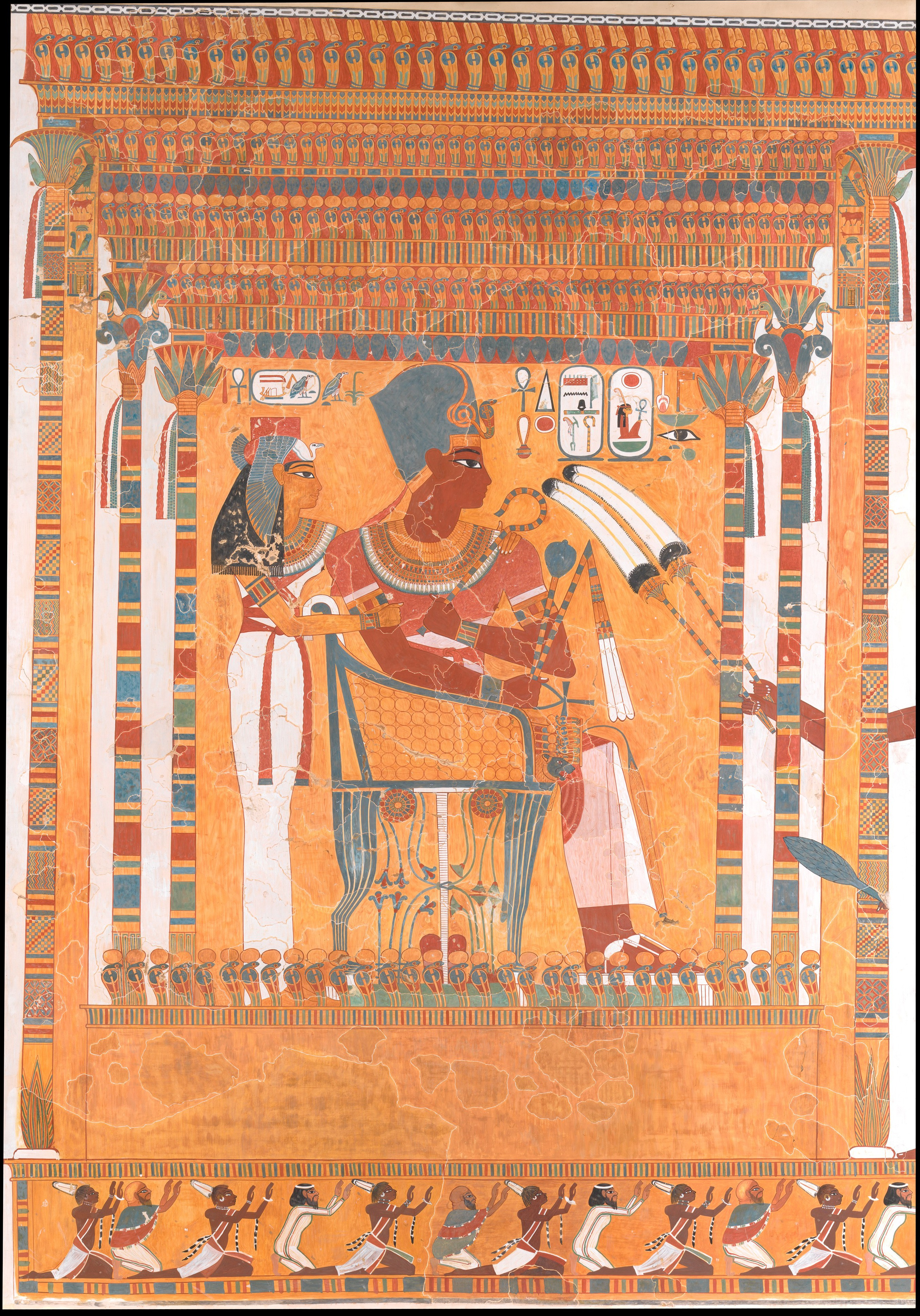
Amenhotep III and his Mother, Mutemwia, in a Kiosk

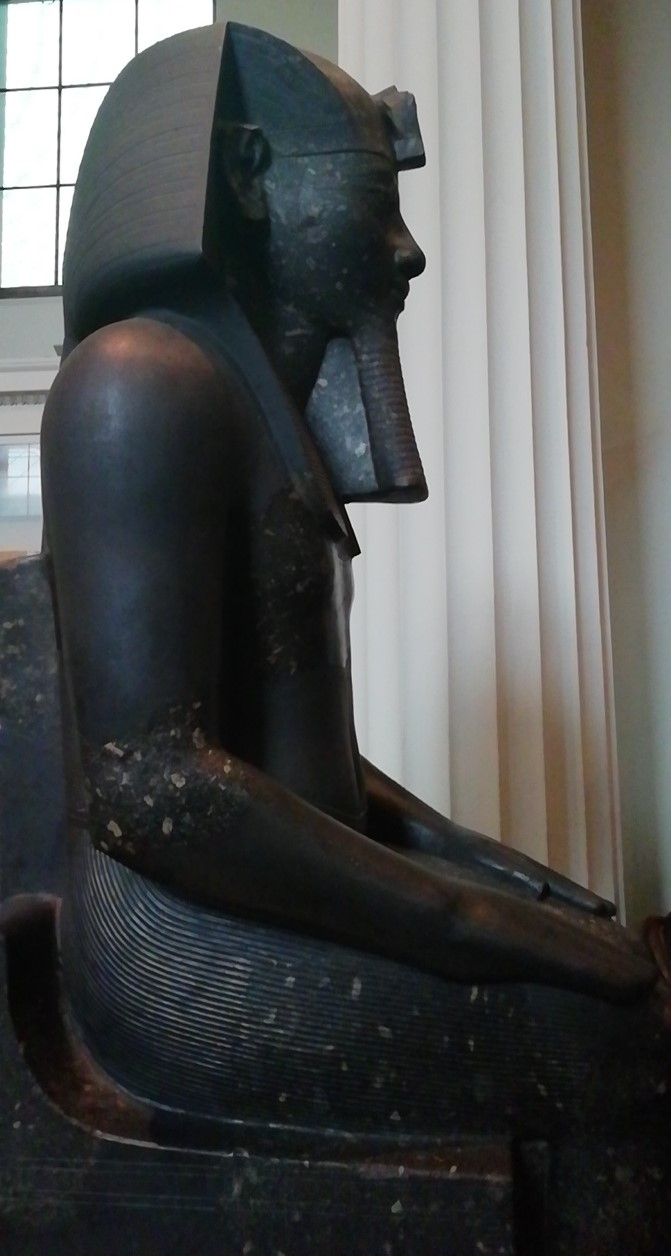
Granodiorite seated statue of Amenhotep at the British Museum, from its left side

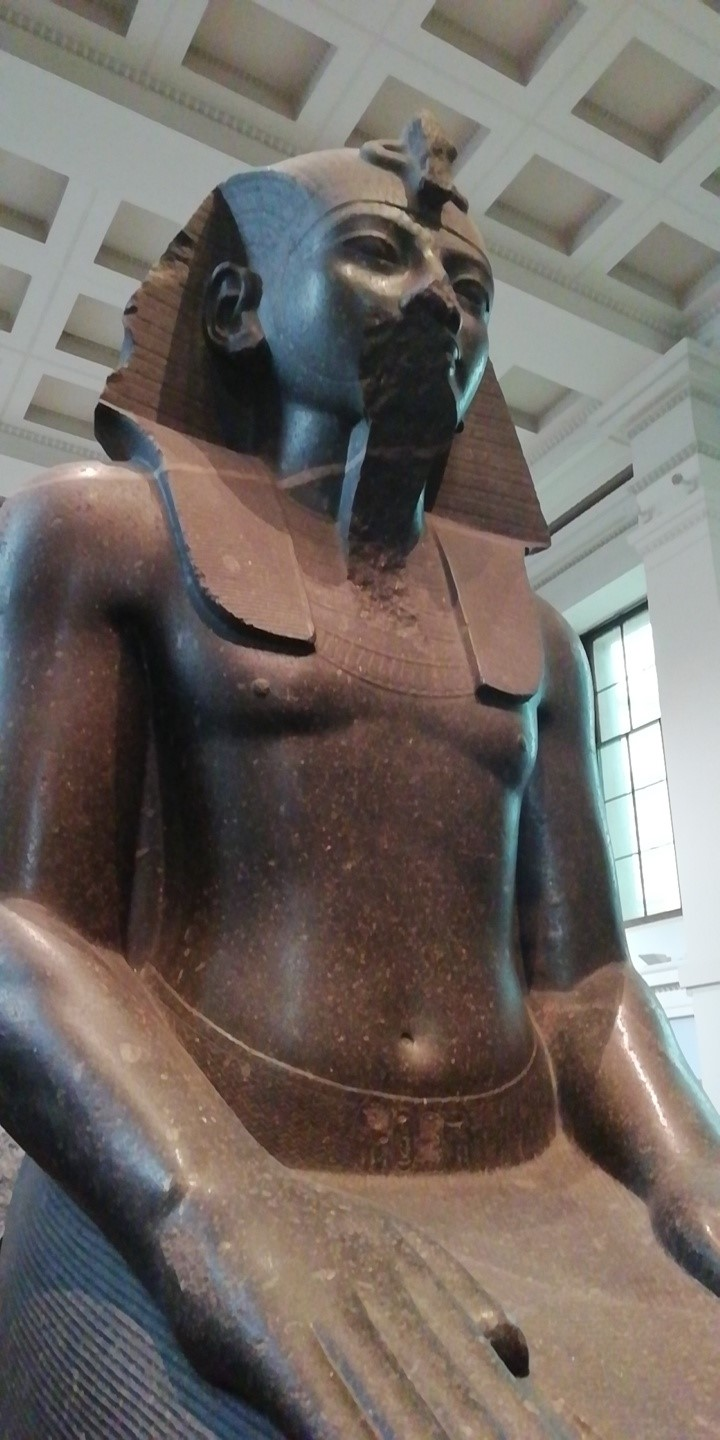
Granodiorite statue of Amenhotep at the British Museum

Granodiorite Amenhotep (Left Statue) Close up, British Museum

Left Inscriptions (Left Statue), British Museum

Right Inscriptions (Left Statue), British Museum

Red Granite Statue, North East side, British Museum

Limestone Amenhotep, British Museum

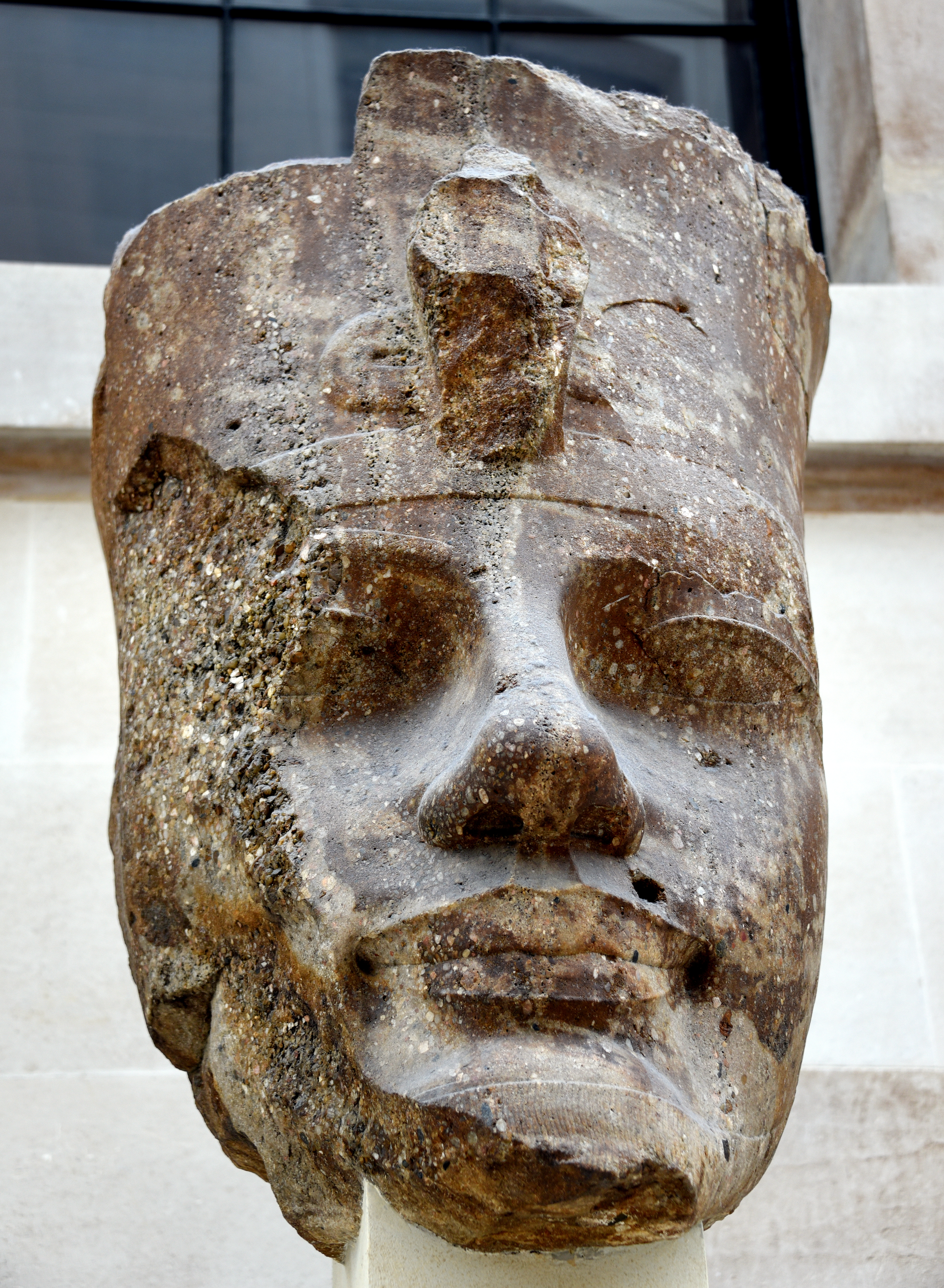
Amenhotep wearing the red crown of Lower Egypt, c. 1400 BC. From Thebes, Egypt. British Museum. EA6

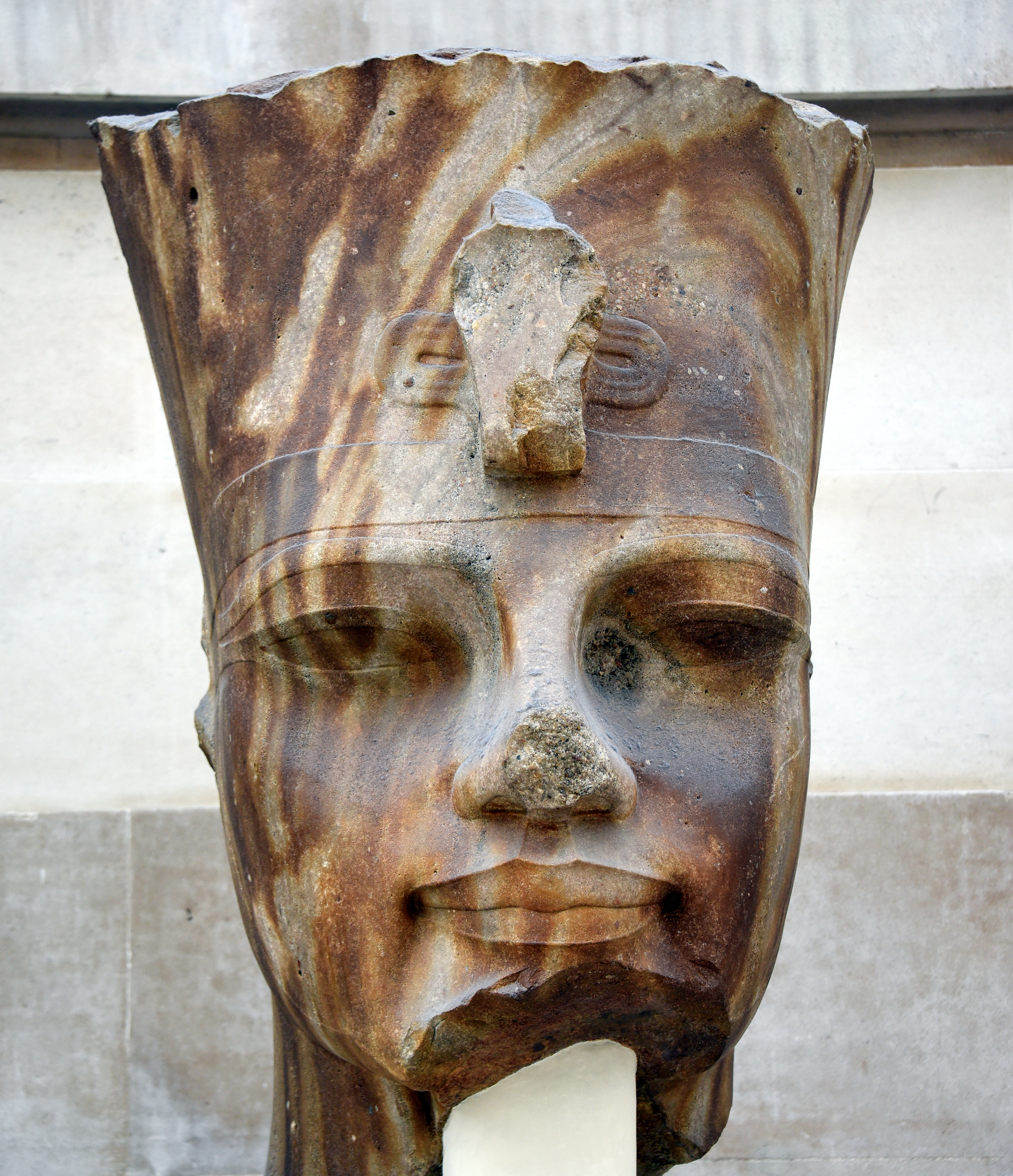
Amenhotep wearing the red crown of Lower Egypt, c. 1400 BC. From Thebes, Egypt. British Museum. EA7.

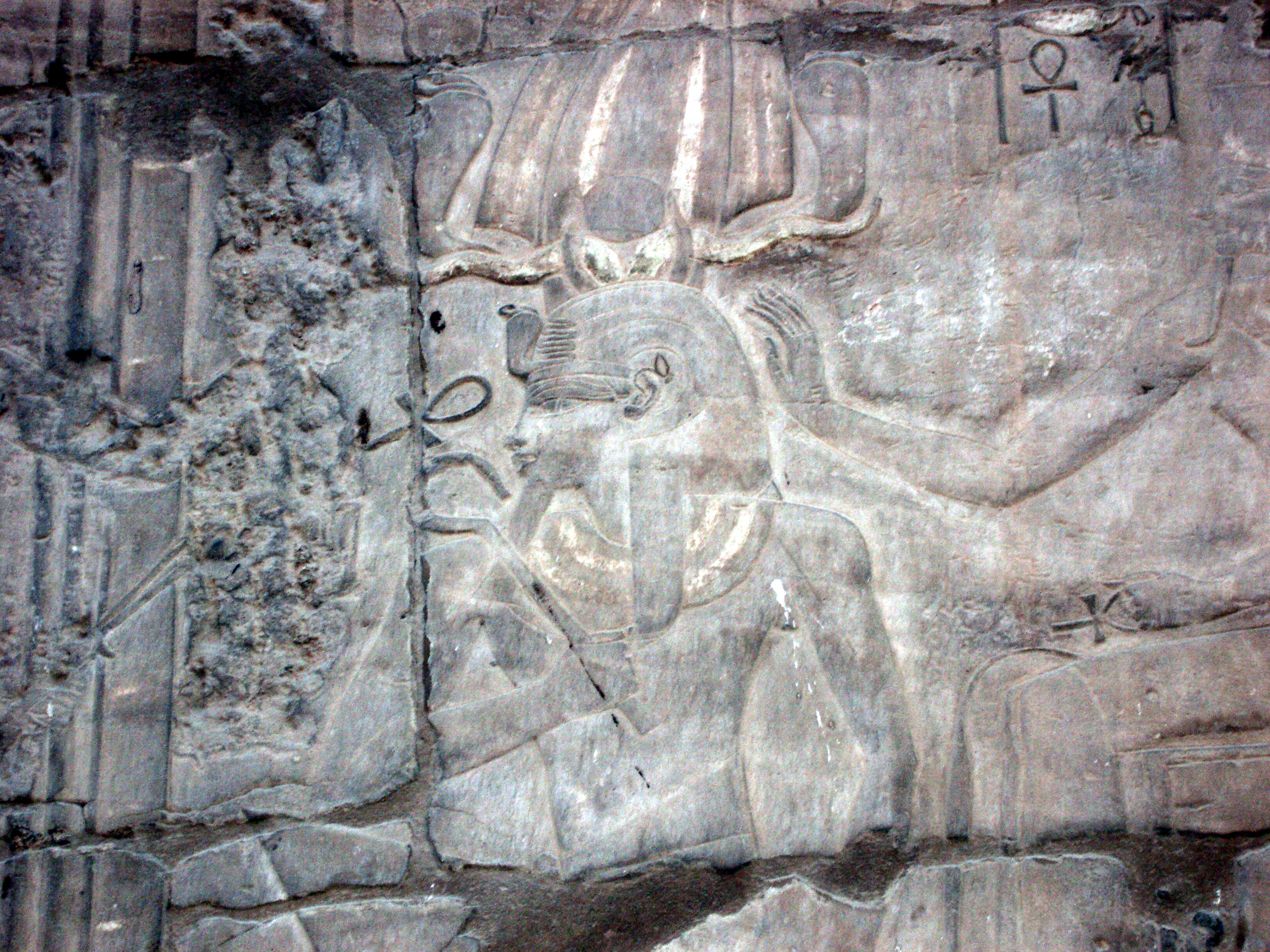
Relief of Amenhotep III from the Luxor temple

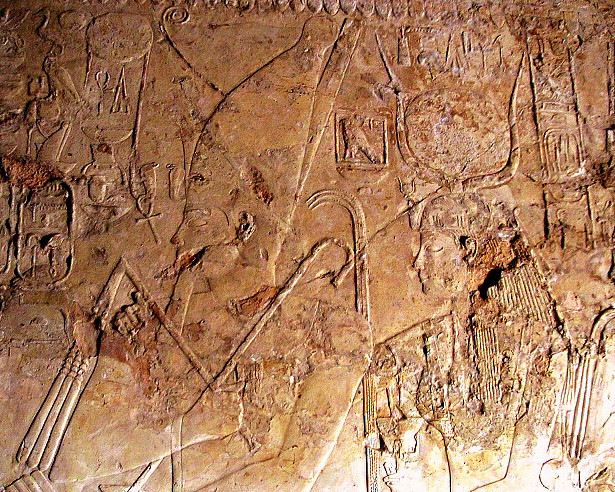
Relief of the tomb of Kheruef, representing the king Amenhotep III, goddess Hathor and the great royal wife Tiye - 18th dynasty of Egypt

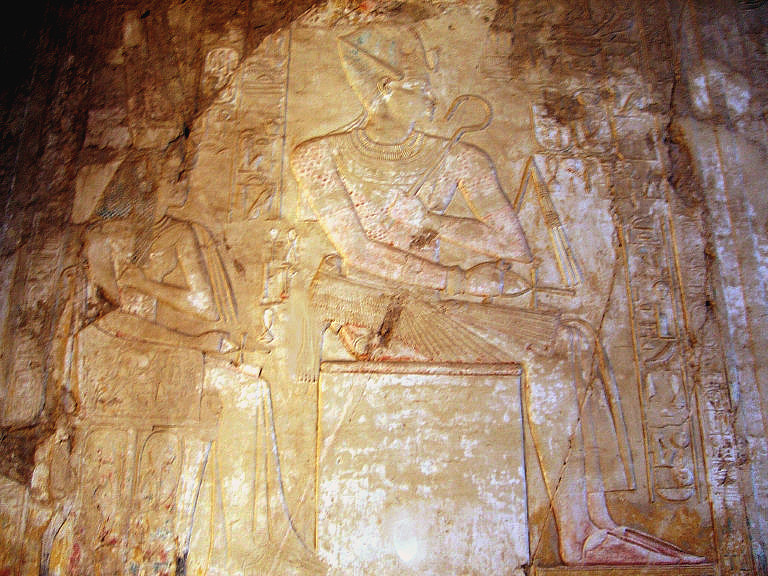
Relief of the tomb of Kheruef, representing the king Amenhotep III and his wife Tiye - 18th dynasty of Egypt

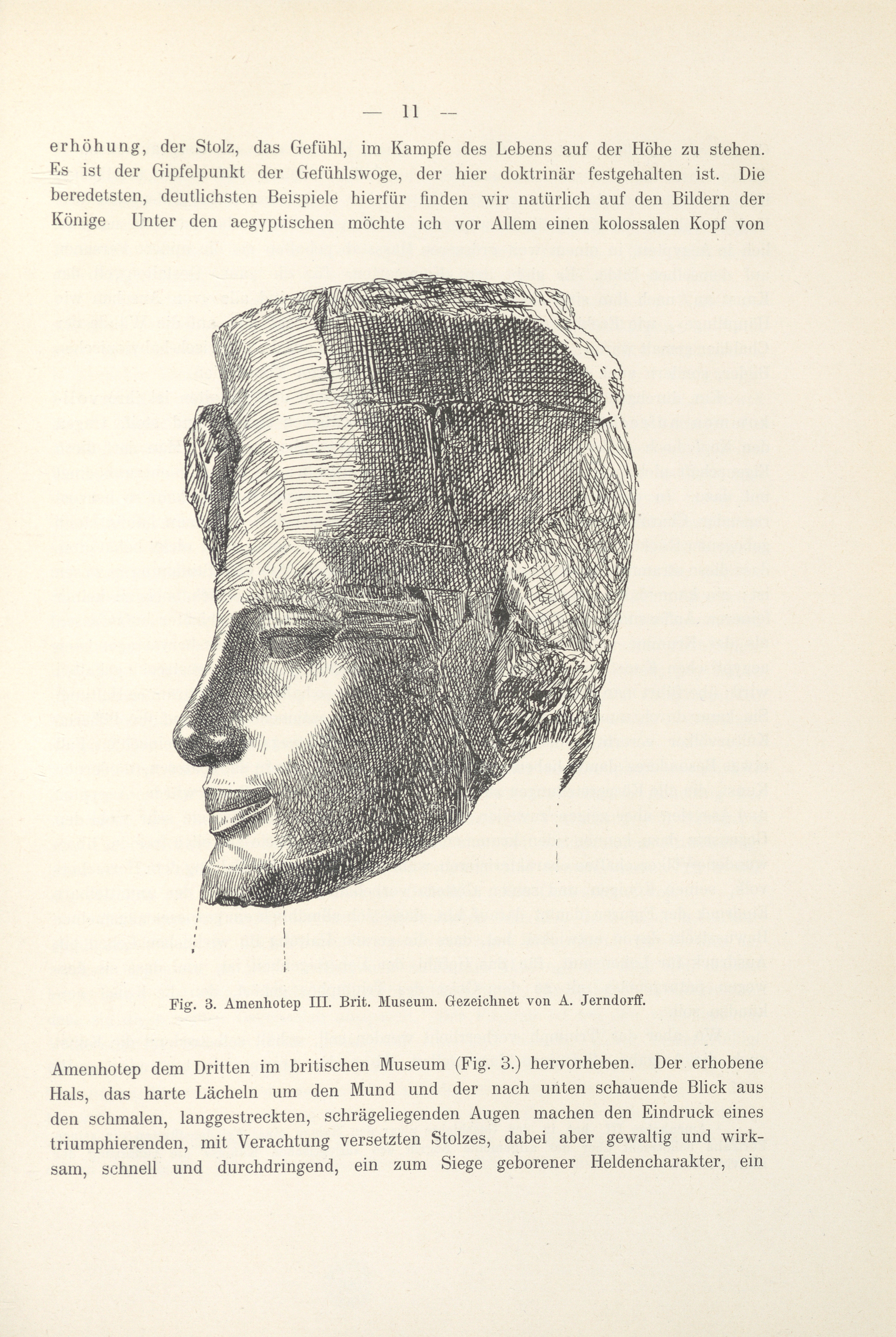
Drawing of Amenhotep III bust in the British Museum

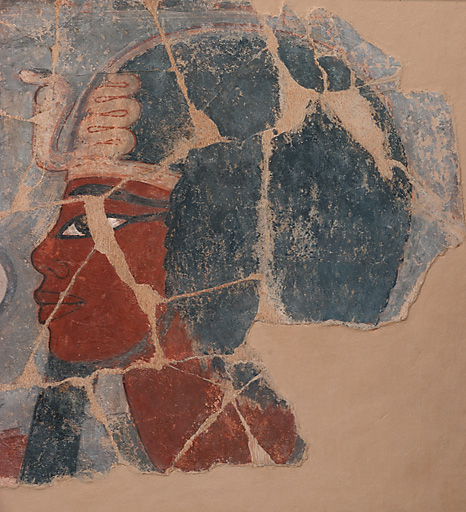
Amenhotep III from KV 22 tomb of Amenhotep III Louvre Museum N 521 A, Other inventory number: LP 2114

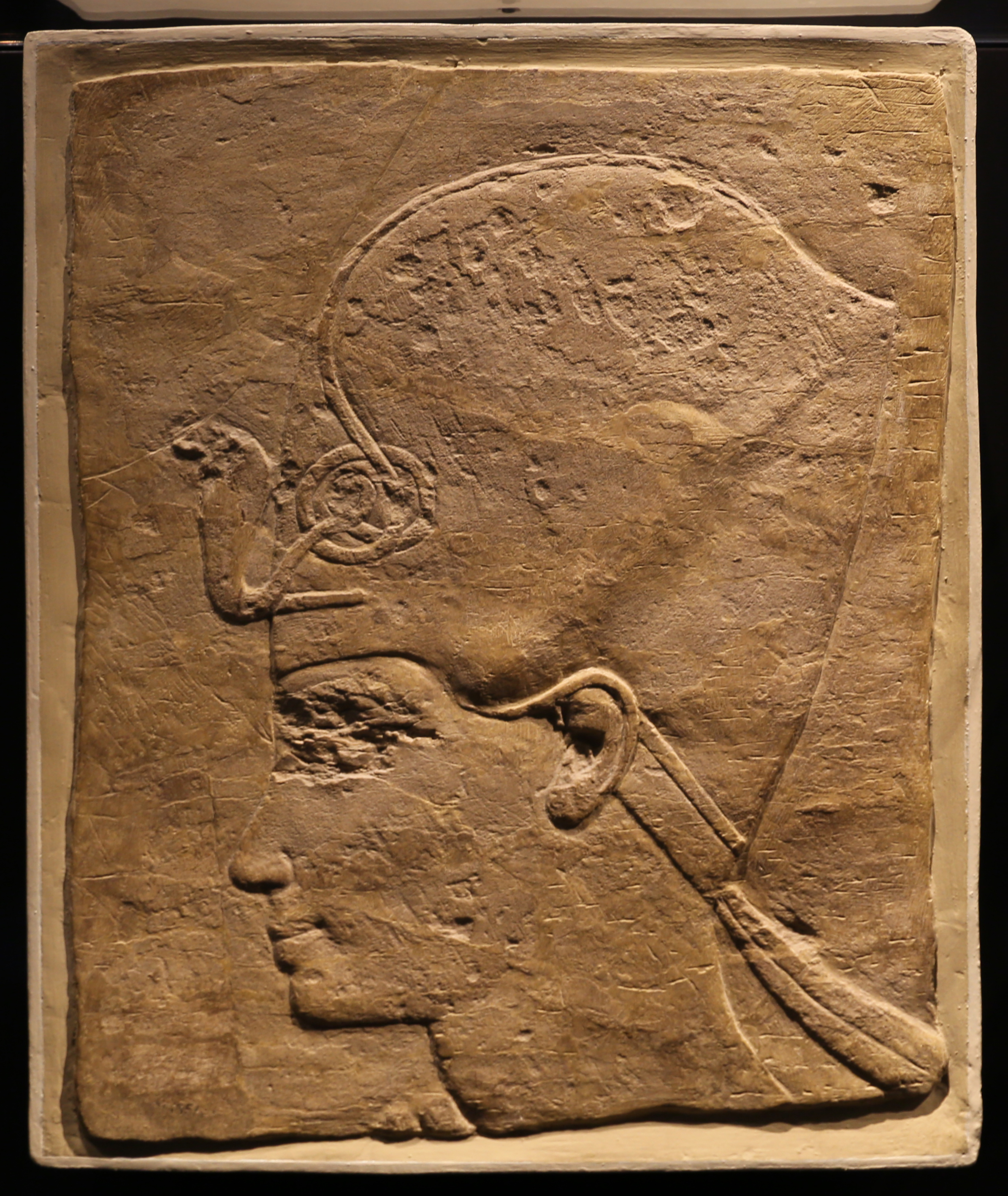
Depiction of Amenhotep III in the Rijksmuseum van Oudheden

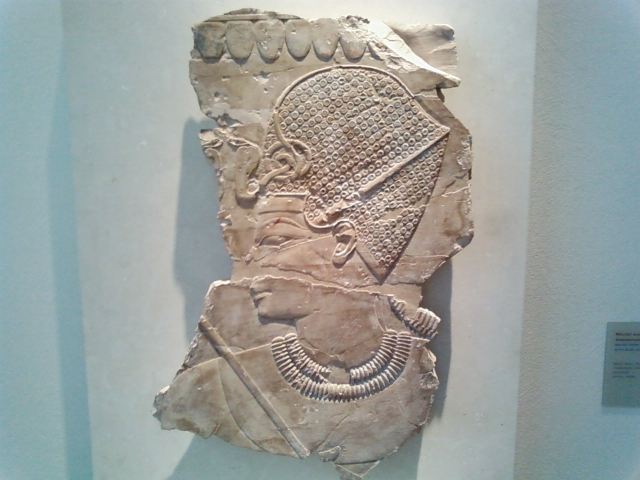
Berlin Neues Museum - relief of king Amenhotep III

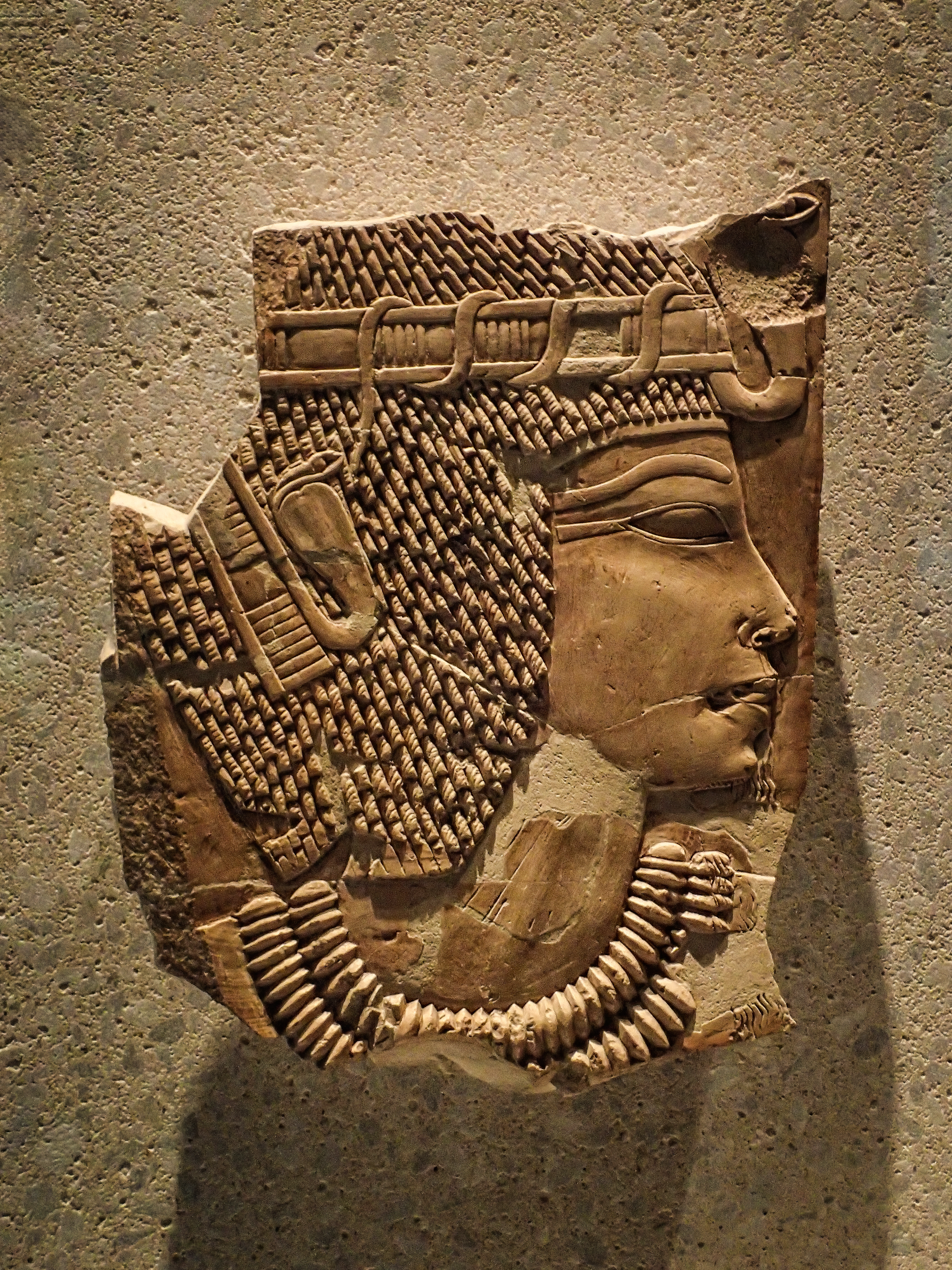
Tomb relief of King Amenhotep III Limestone Dynasty 18 Egypt c. 1360 BC

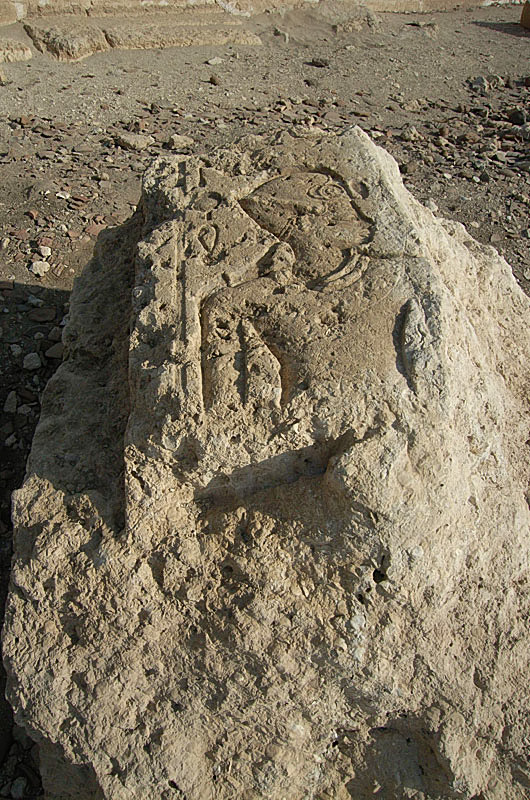
Relief fragment of Amenhotep III, Zawiyat el-Maiyitin, Egypt

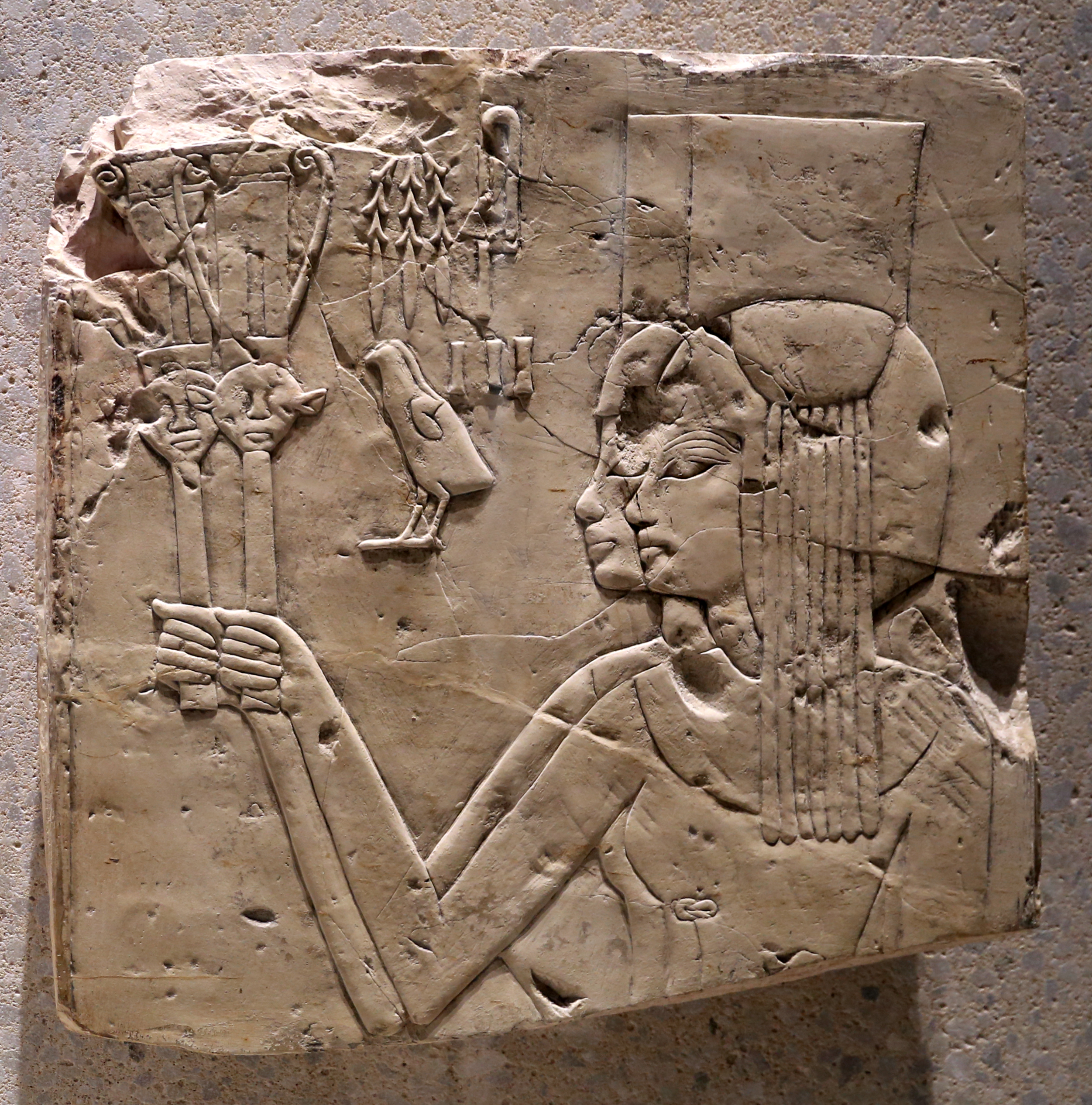
Fragment of a tomb relief depicting two princesses (daughters of Amenhotep III) with sistra. TT192, Tomb of Kheruef Collections of the Egyptian Museum and Papyrus Collection of Berlin

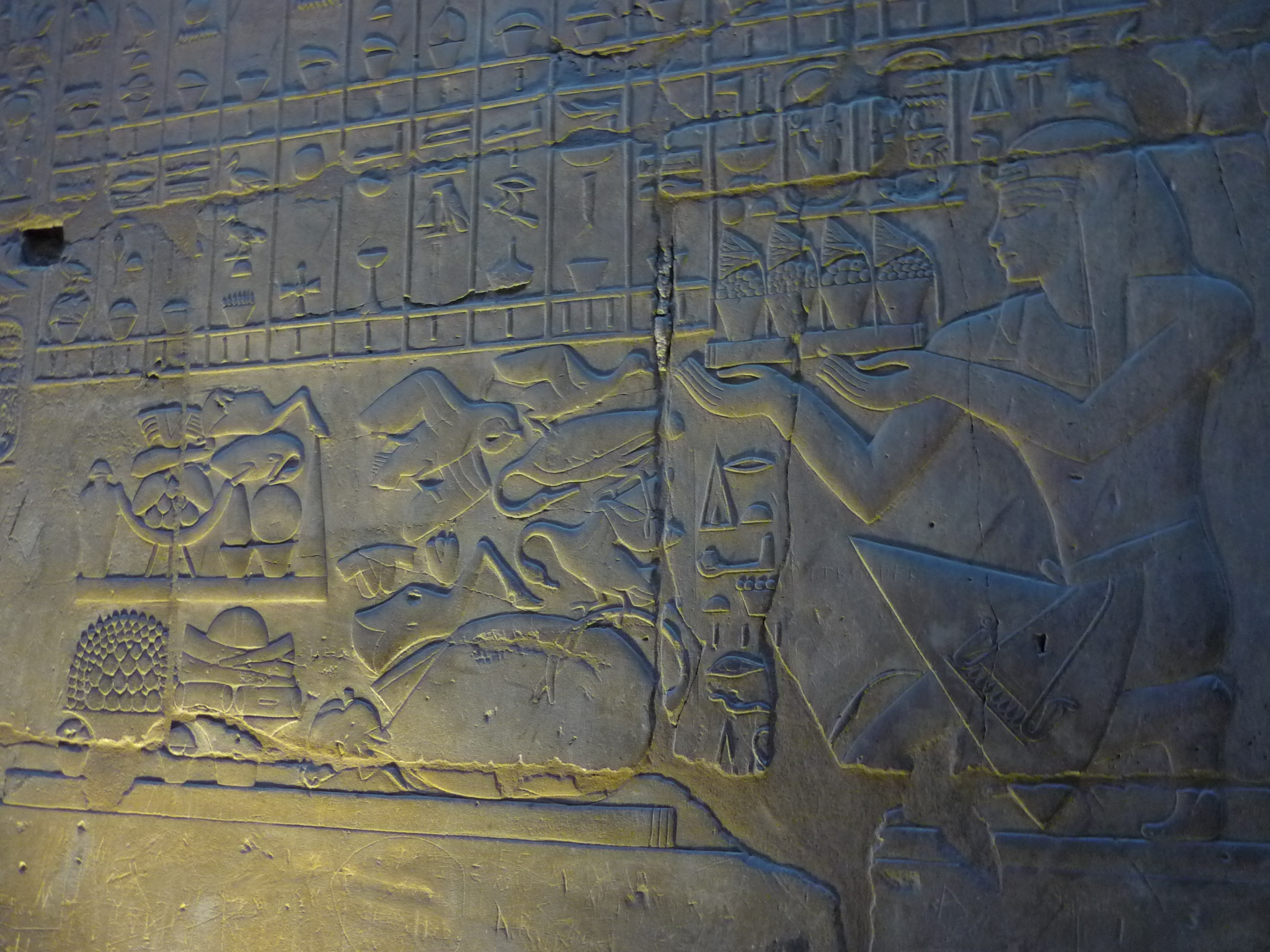
Wall relief of Amenhotep III in sanctuary, Luxor Temple, Egypt

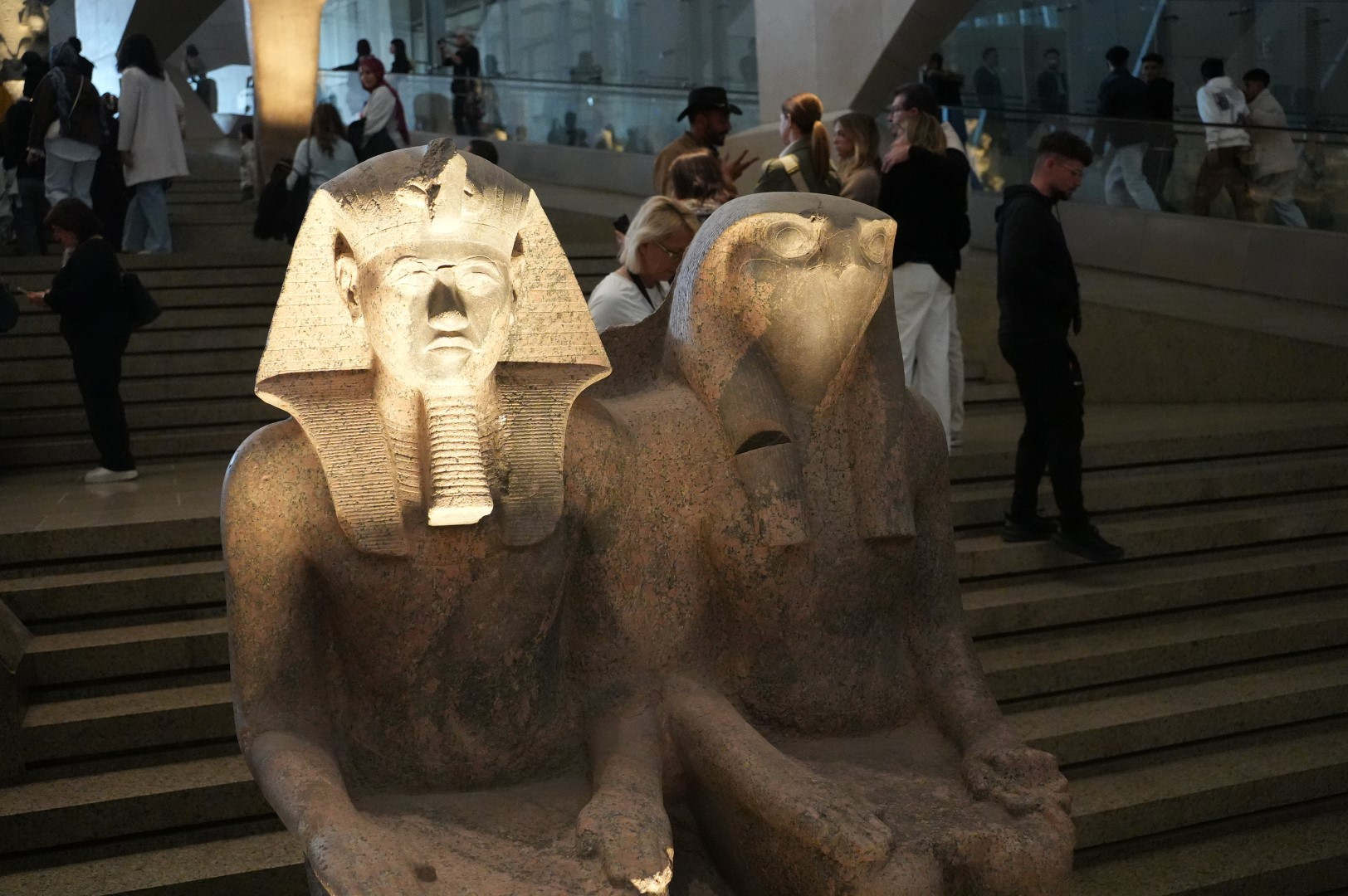
Amenhotep and Horus, from Thebes, now in the Grand Egyptian Museum

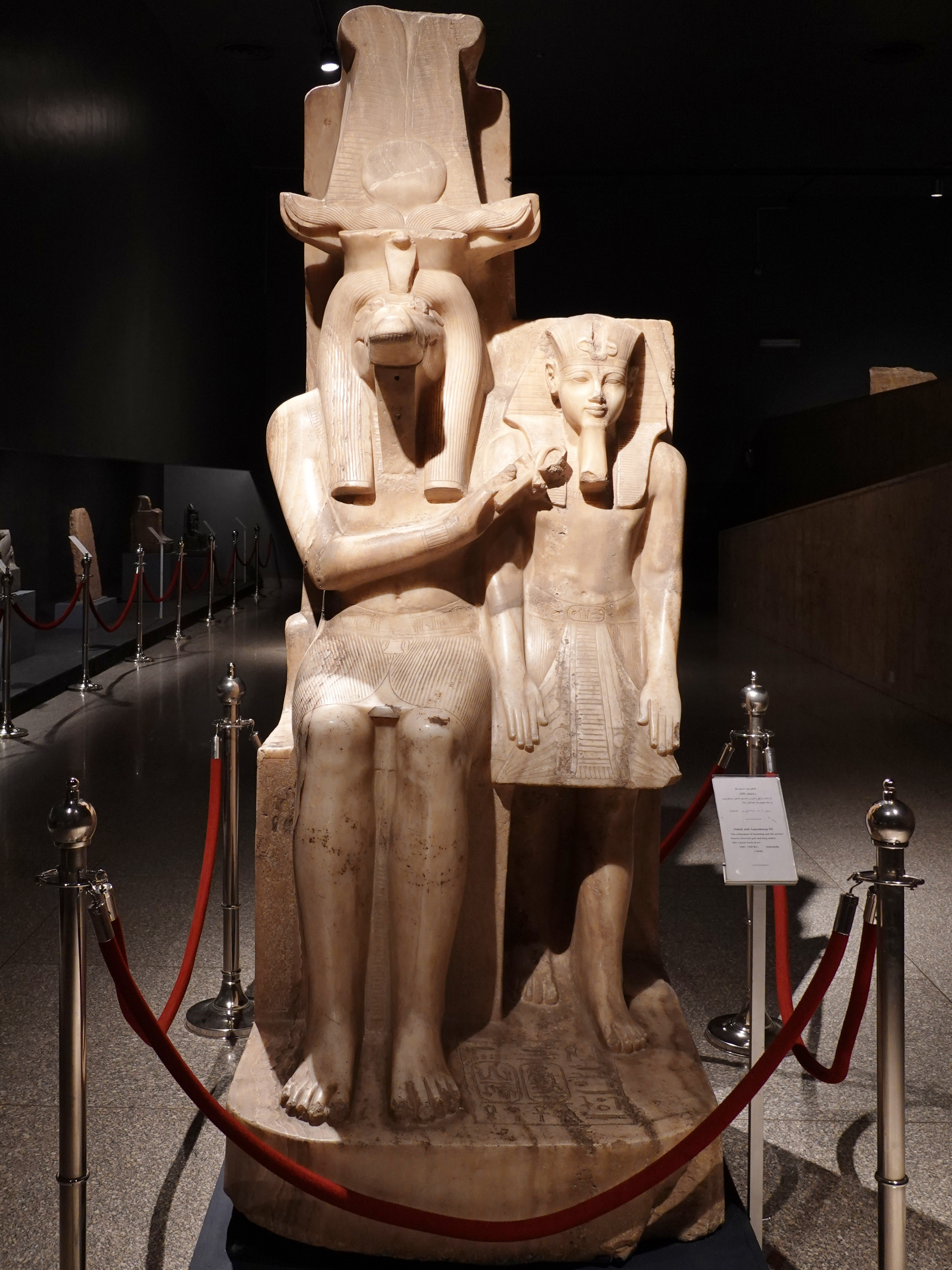
Amenhotep and Sobek, from Dahamsha, now in the Luxor Museum

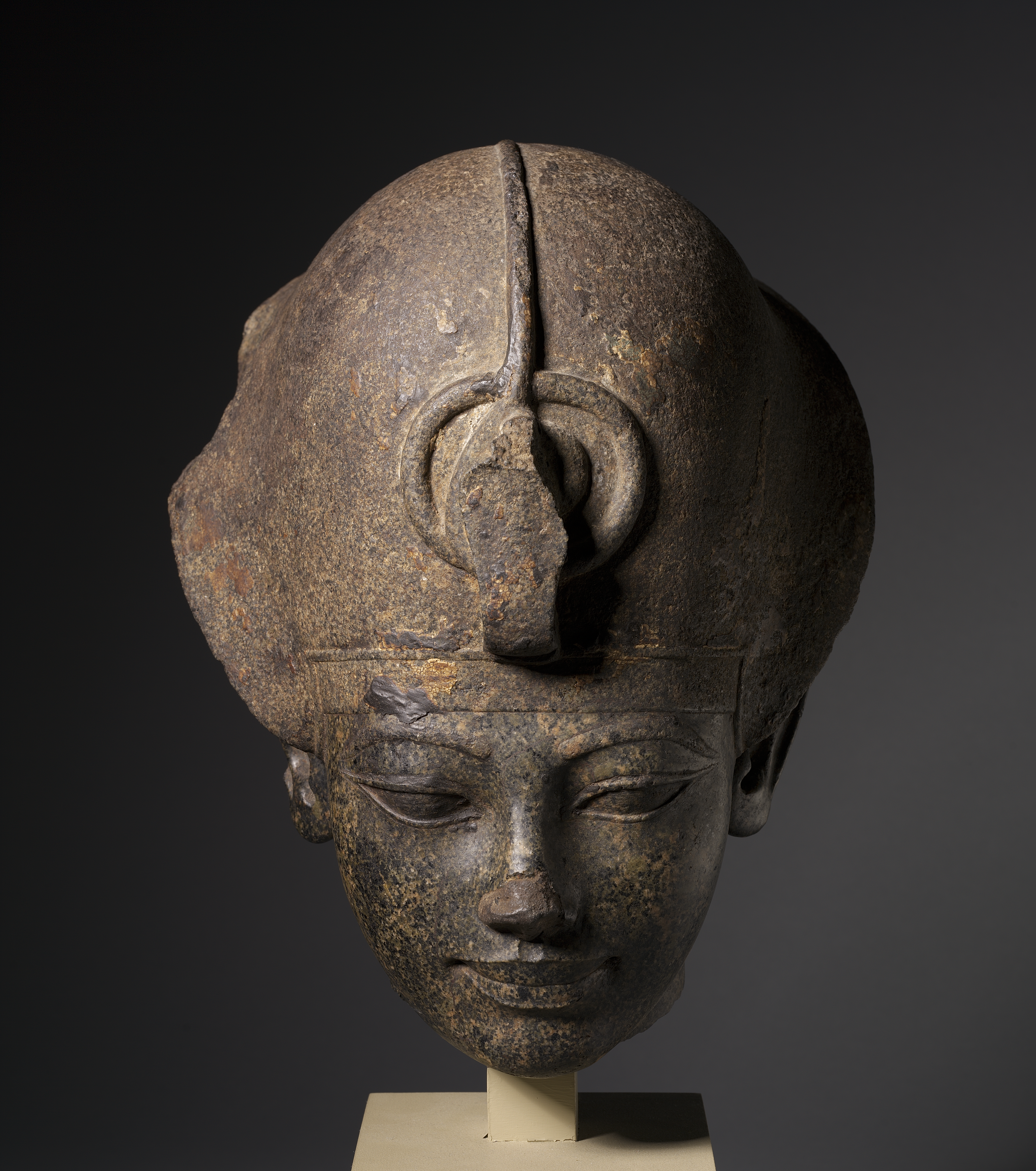
A statue head of Amenhotep III collected by the Cleveland Museum of Art. The image was created during his reign.

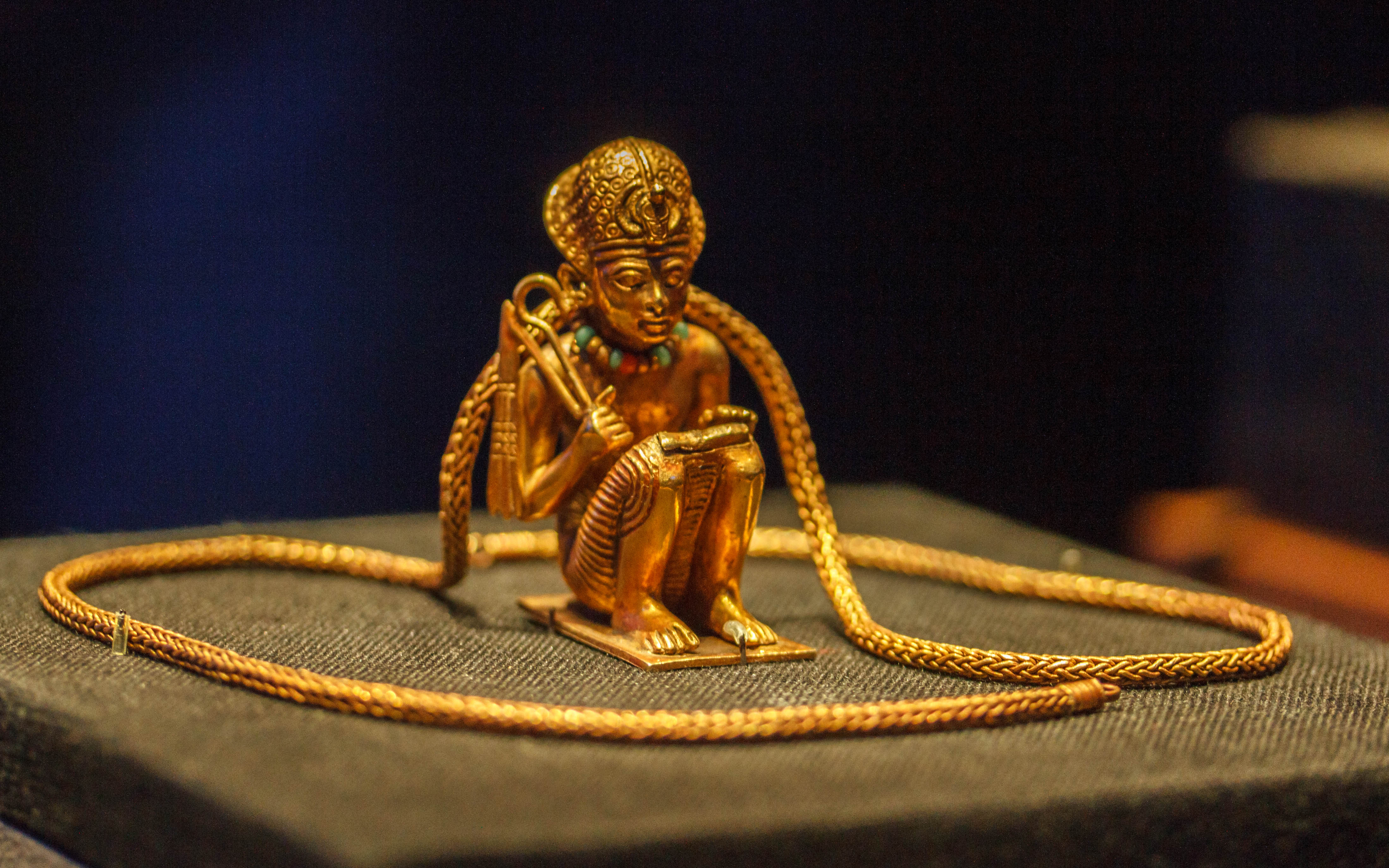
A squatting figurine of Amenhotep III that was found in the Tomb of Tutankhamun

== See also ==
- Colossal red granite statue of Amenhotep III
- Colossal quartzite statue of Amenhotep III
- History of ancient Egypt
- Eighteenth dynasty of Egypt Family Tree
- List of pharaohs
- Quay with Sphinxes
- The lion hunts of Amenhotep III during the first ten years of his reign

== Bibliography ==
- Aldred, Cyril (1991). Akhenaten: King of Egypt. Thames & Hudson.
- Allen, James P. (2009). "The Amarna Succession" (PDF). In Brand, Peter James; Cooper, Louise (eds.). Causing His Name to Live: Studies in Egyptian Epigraphy and History in Memory of William J. Murnane. Leiden; Boston: Brill. pp. 9–20. ISBN 978-90-04-17644-7.
- Aston, David, (2012), Radiocarbon, Wine Jars And New Kingdom Chronology Ägypten und Levante/Egypt and the Levante 22 (2012), pp. 293 (on Amenhotep III)
- Beckerath, Jürgen von (1997). Chronologie des Pharaonischen Ägypten. Mainz: Philipp von Zabern. ISBN 3-8053-2310-7.
- Berman, Lawrence M. (1998). "Overview of Amenhotep III and His Reign". In O'Connor, David; Cline, Eric (eds.). Amenhotep III: Perspectives on His Reign (2001 ed.). Ann Arbor: University of Michigan Press. pp. 1–25. ISBN 0-472-10742-9.
- Blankenberg-van Delden, C. (1969). The Large Commemorative Scarabs of Amenhotep III. Leiden: E.J. Brill. ISBN 978-90-04-00474-0.
- Cassirer, Manfred (1952). "A hb-sd Stela of Amenophis III". The Journal of Egyptian Archaeology. 38: 128–130. doi:10.2307/3855505. JSTOR 3855505.
- Clayton, Peter (1994). Chronicle of the Pharaohs. Thames & Hudson Ltd. ISBN 978-0-500-05074-3.
- Dodson, Aidan; Hilton, Dyan (2004). The Complete Royal Families of Ancient Egypt. London: Thames & Hudson. ISBN 0-500-05128-3.
- Dorman, Peter (2009). "The Long Coregency Revisited: Architectural and Iconographic Conundra in the Tomb of Kheruef" (PDF). In Brand, Peter James; Cooper, Louise (eds.). Causing His Name to Live: Studies in Egyptian Epigraphy and History in Memory of William J. Murnane. Leiden; Boston: Brill. pp. 65–82. ISBN 978-90-04-17644-7.
- Fletcher, Joann (2000). Chronicle of a Pharaoh – The Intimate Life of Amenhotep III. Oxford University Press. ISBN 978-0-19-521660-8.
- Gad, Yehia; Ismail, Somaia; Fathalla, Dina; Khairat, Rabab; Fares, Suzan; Gad, Ahmed Zakaria; Saad, Rama; Moustafa, Amal; ElShahat, Eslam; Mandil, Naglaa; Fateen, Mohamed; Elleithy, Hisham; Wasef, Sally; Zink, Albert; Hawass, Zahi; Pusch, Carsten (2020). "Maternal and Paternal Lineages in King Tutankhamun's Family". In Kamrin, Janice; Bárta, Miroslav; Ikram, Salima; Lehner, Mark; Megahed, Mohamed (eds.). Guardian of Ancient Egypt: Essays in Honor of Zahi Hawass. Czech Institute of Egyptology. pp. 497–518. ISBN 978-80-7308-979-5.
- Grajetzki, Wolfram (2005). Ancient Egyptian Queens: A Hieroglyphic Dictionary. London: Golden House Publications. ISBN 978-0-9547218-9-3.
- Grimal, Nicolas (1992). A History of Ancient Egypt. Blackwell Books.
- Hawass, Zahi; et al. (17 February 2010). "Ancestry and Pathology in King Tutankhamun's Family" (PDF). The Journal of the American Medical Association. 303 (7): 638–647. doi:10.1001/jama.2010.121. PMID 20159872.
- Hayes, William (1973). "Internal affairs from Thutmosis I to the death of Amenophis III". The Middle East and the Aegean Region, C. 1800–1380 BC. Pt 1, Vol 2.
- Kozloff, Arielle; Bryan, Betsy (1992). Royal and Divine Statuary in Egypt's Dazzling Sun: Amenhotep III and his World. Cleveland.
- Kozloff, Arielle P. (2012). Amenhotep III: Egypt's Radiant Pharaoh. Cambridge: Cambridge University Press. ISBN 978-1-107-01196-0.
- Leprohon, Ronald J. (2013). The Great Name: Ancient Egyptian Royal Titulary. SBL Press. ISBN 978-1-58983-736-2.
- Lichtheim, Miriam (1980). Ancient Egyptian Literature: A Book of Readings: The Late Period. University of California Press.
- Moran, William L. (1992). The Amarna Letters. Baltimore: Johns Hopkins University Press. ISBN 0-8018-4251-4.
- O'Connor, David; Cline, Eric (1998). Amenhotep III: Perspectives on His Reign. University of Michigan Press.
- O'Connor, David; Cline, Eric H. (2001). Amenhotep III: Perspectives on His Reign. University of Michigan Press.
- Reeves, Nicholas (2000). Akhenaten: Egypt's False Prophet. Thames & Hudson.
- Reeves, Nicholas; Wilkinson, Richard H. (1996). The Complete Valley of the Kings: Tombs and Treasures of Egypt's Greatest Pharaohs (2000 ed.). London: Thames and Hudson. ISBN 0-500-05080-5.
- Smith, Grafton Elliot (1912). The Royal Mummies. Cairo.
- Troy, Lana (1986). "Patterns of Queenship in Ancient Egyptian Myth and History". Uppsala Studies in Ancient Mediterranean and Near Eastern Civilizations. 14.
- Tyldesley, Joyce (2006). Chronicle of the Queens of Egypt. Thames & Hudson.

== Article ==
- A Chronological Perspective on the Transition from Amenhotep III to Amenhotep IV / Akhenaten by José Lull − Universitat Autònoma de Barcelona, IEPOA, Aula Orientalis 37/1 (2019) pp.61-89
