= Peter Dorman =

American anthropologist (born 1948)

Peter FitzGerald Dorman (born 1948) is an American epigrapher, philologist, and Egyptologist. Recently a professor of history and archaeology at the American University of Beirut (AUB), he served as the 15th President of the university from 2008 to 2015. He spent most of his career as a professor and chair in the department of Near Eastern Languages and Civilizations (NELC) of the University of Chicago, and was director of Chicago House in Luxor, the Epigraphic Survey field project of the Oriental Institute. He is presently a professor emeritus of the University of Chicago.

== Career ==
Dorman is known for his work as a historiographer, epigrapher and philologist, and is a leader in the study of the ancient Near East. He is the author and editor of several major books and many articles on the study of ancient Egypt and is probably best known for his historical work on the reign of Hatshepsut and the Amarna period. His most recent monograph, Faces in Clay: Technique, Imagery, and Allusion in a Corpus of Ceramic Sculpture from Ancient Egypt (2002), examines artisanal craftsmanship in light of material culture, iconography, and religious texts. He and Betsy M. Bryan of The Johns Hopkins University have co-edited a series of volumes on the Theban area: Sacred Space and Sacred Function in Ancient Thebes (2007); Perspectives on Ptolemaic Thebes (2011); Creativity and Innovation in the Reign of Hatshepsut (2014) with José Galán of the National Spanish Research Council, Madrid; and Mural Decoration in the Theban New Kingdom Necropolis (2023). Dorman has also rejected the theory of a coregency between Akhenaten and his father, Amenhotep III in two articles

From 2002 to 2008, Dorman chaired the Department of Near Eastern Languages and Civilizations at the University of Chicago. Prior to that, he spent nine years (1988–1997) leading the epigraphic efforts at Chicago House in Luxor, Egypt. From 1977 to 1988, he worked in curatorial positions in the Department of Egyptian Art at the Metropolitan Museum of Art in New York.

On March 21, 2008, the Board of Trustees selected Peter F. Dorman to be the 15th president of the American University of Beirut (effective July 1, 2008), succeeding John Waterbury, who was president from 1998 to 2008. Born in Beirut to a family associated with Lebanon for many generations, Dorman is the great-great grandson of the founder of AUB, Reverend Daniel Bliss. During his presidency, he led the university in a major expansion of its medical center, invigorated interdisciplinary research across the institution, initiated the university’s most ambitious fundraising campaign, championed the reinstatement of faculty tenure, greatly enhanced the level of financial assistance provided to students, and saw AUB's rankings rise from unranked status in the 500s of the QS World Rankings (2007) to 249 (2014). Since 2019, Dorman has been a member of the board of trustees at The American College of the Mediterranean (ACM), an American-style degree-granting institution in Aix-en-Provence, France, which includes IAU College, a study abroad institute for undergraduates.
