= Alexander Badawy =

Egyptian Egyptologist

- Born: 29 November 1913; Cairo, Egypt, British Empire
- Died: May 1986 (aged 72)
- Occupation: Egyptologist
- Employer(s): University of California, Los Angeles

Alexander Badawy (November 29, 1913 – May 1986) was an Egyptian-American Egyptologist. Born in the Egypt and taught Egyptology in the United States, he was professor of art history at UCLA, and after he became emeritus, he endowed a chair (in 1985) at Johns Hopkins University, currently held by Betsy Bryan.

== Selected publications ==
- Coptic Art and Archaeology: The Art of the Christian Egyptians from the Late Antique to the Middle Ages, 1978
- Architecture in Ancient Egypt and the Near East, 1966
- A history of Egyptian architecture
