= Arielle P. Kozloff =

American historian (born 1947)

Arielle P. Kozloff (born 23 December 1947) is an American historian and Egyptologist, best known for her works on Ancient Egypt, having co-authored The God's Delight: The Human Figure in Classical Bronze (1988) with David Gordon Mitten and Egypt's Dazzling Sun (1992) with Betsy Bryan. She was previously a curator at the Cleveland Museum of Art.
