= Betsy Bryan =

American Egyptologist

Betsy Morrell Bryan (born 1949) is an American Egyptologist who is the former leader of a joint-university team that is excavating the Precinct of Mut complex in Karnak, at Luxor in Upper Egypt.

Until 2022, she was the Alexander Badawy Professor of Egyptian Art and Archaeology, and Near Eastern Studies Professor at Johns Hopkins University.

Her work has included research and writing about Thutmose IV and Amenhotep III, and on an Egyptian drinking festival. She also edited a book on 'Sacred Space and Sacred Function in Ancient Thebes in 2007 by the University of Chicago Oriental Institute.

== Books ==
- Edited by Betsy M. Bryan & Peter F. Dorman, Sacred Space and Sacred Function in Ancient Thebes, The Oriental Institute of the University of Chicago, Studies in Ancient Oriental Civilization 61, 2007 ARCHIVED COPY'
- Edited by Betsy M. Bryan & Peter F. Dorman & Jose M. Galan, Creativity and Innovation in the Reign of Hatshepsut, The Oriental Institute of the University of Chicago, Studies in Ancient Oriental Civilization 69, 2014 ARCHIVED COPY
- The quest for immortality: treasures of ancient Egypt / Erik Hornung and Betsy M. Bryan, editors; contributions by Betsy M. Bryan ... [et al.]. Washington, D.C. : National Gallery of Art; Copenhagen : United Exhibits Group, c2002. xiv, 239 p. : col. ill., col. map; 30 cm. ISBN 3-7913-2735-6 (alk. paper), ISBN 0-89468-303-9 (pbk. : alk. paper)
- The reign of Thutmose IV / Betsy M. Bryan. Baltimore : Johns Hopkins University Press, c1991. 389 p., 19 p. of plates : ill.; 26 cm. ISBN 0-8018-4202-6 (alk. paper)
- Egypt’s dazzling sun: Amenhotep III and his world / by Arielle P. Kozloff and Betsy M. Bryan with Lawrence M. Berman; and an essay by Elisabeth Delange; [translation of the essay ... by Arielle P. Kozloff]. Cleveland : Cleveland Museum of Art in collaboration with Indiana University Press; Bloomington, IN : Distributed by Indiana University Press, 1992. xxiv, 476 p. : ill. (some col. ); 30 cm. ISBN 0-940717-16-6 (hbk.), ISBN 0-940717-17-4 (pbk.)
- You can be a woman Egyptologist / Betsy Morrell Bryan and Judith Love Cohen; illustrations, David A. Katz. Marina Del Rey, Calif. : Cascade Pass, 1999. 38 p. : col. ill.; 21 x 22 cm. ISBN 1-880599-45-7 (hbk.), ISBN 1-880599-10-4 (pbk.)

== Sources ==
- Hopkins in Egypt Today
- Archaeologists Bring Egyptian Excavation to the Web January 5, 2006
- The Gazette Online ""Betsy Bryan ... is part of an international team bringing a new exhibit of artifacts to the National Gallery of Art. ... Bryan is the curator of The Quest for Immortality: Treasures of Ancient Egypt"
- Betsy Bryan Transcript Interview with the American Research Center in Egypt September 2021
