= David Gordon Mitten =

American historian (1935–2022)

David Gordon Mitten (26 October 1935, in Youngstown, Ohio – 18 January 2022) was an American historian and antiquarian, specialising in Ancient Greece. A professor emeritus at Harvard University, he was also a curator at the Harvard University Art Museums. He graduated from Oberlin College (BA) and Harvard (PhD).
