= The lion hunts of Amenhotep III during the first ten years of his reign =

Historical and commemorative scarabs

Lion Hunt Scarab from the Royal Pump Room, Harrogate

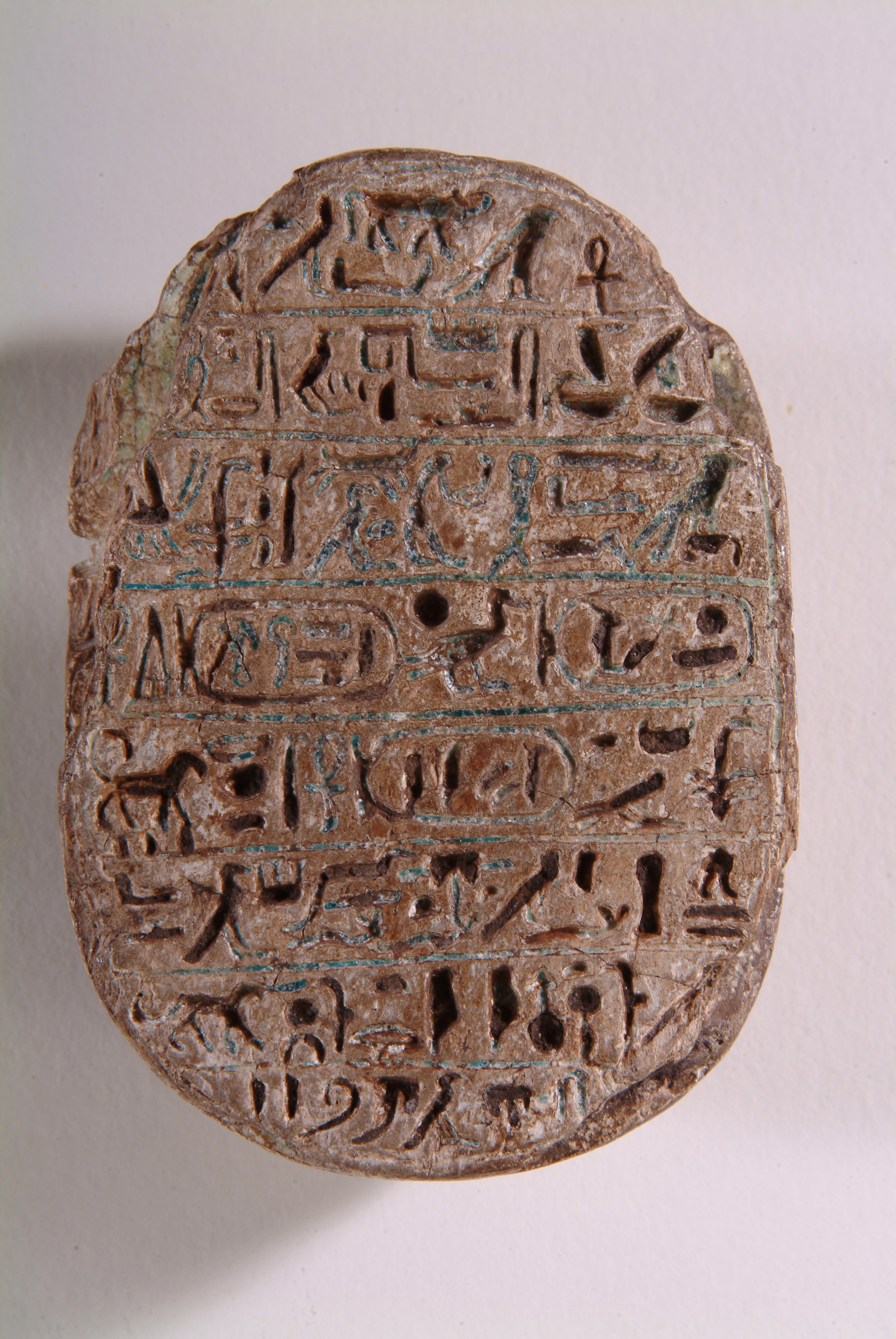
Base with inscription

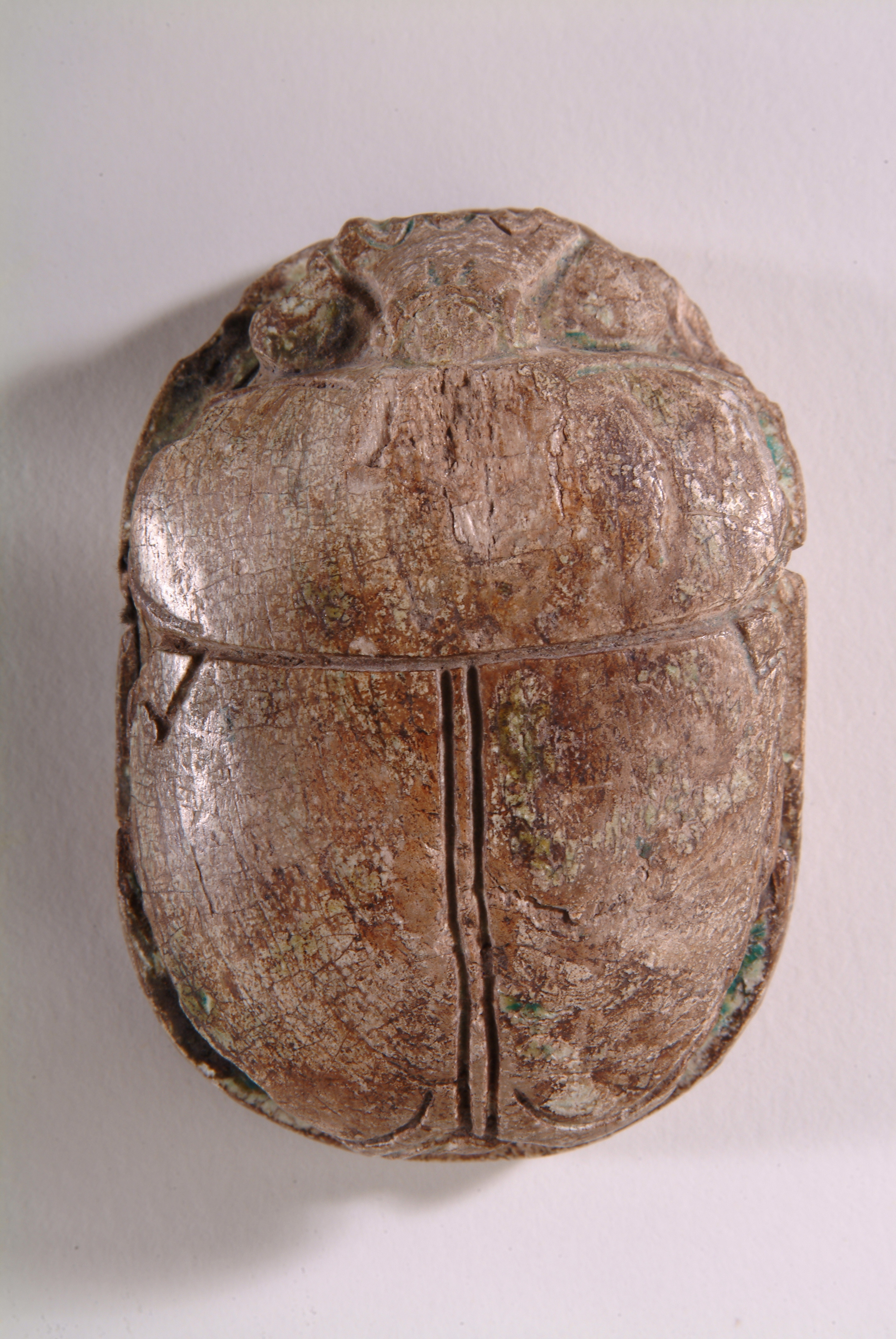
Top of the scarab

The Lion-Hunts of Amenhotep III During the First Ten Years of his Reign is one of a group of five historical and commemorative scarabs of Amenhotep III. The set of five scarabs were presumably used to validate, and proclaim his choice of Tiye as his wife. (Both were extremely young, not yet teenagers.)

Each of the five scarabs starts with the same pronunciation of Amenhotep's name, followed by a reference to his wife, Tiye.

== Scarab specifics ==
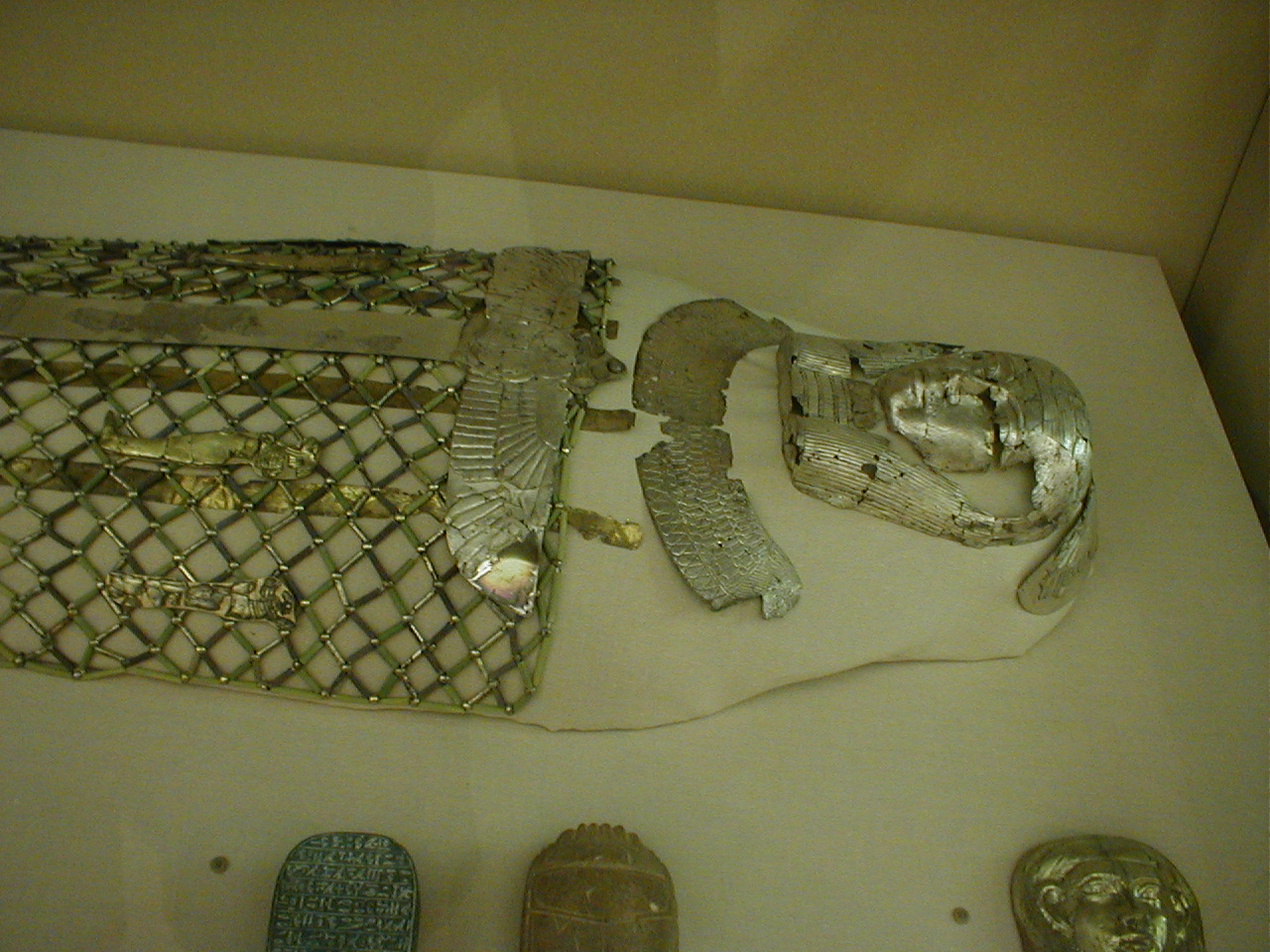
Example scarab: Queen Mernua coffin, 2 large scarabs, one showing many lines of text.

Because the five memorial scarabs were for public dissemination, multiple copies were made and circulated. Kerrigan's book has a photo of the scarab from the Oriental Institute, Chicago. Budge's reference translates a British Museum scarab-(B.M. 4096), of eight lines of text. The Oriental Institute scarab is also a text of eight lines, but has minor variations from the British Museum scarab; the scarab is pictured in the section for Tiy's Wedding Scarab, but there is no photo of Tiy's Wedding scarab. Instead they use the photo of Amenhotep's Lion Hunts.

Since copies of the five scarabs were made for dissemination, they have been claimed to be a form of "public information reading", much like a news release from a newspaper.

== The lion hunt story, line-by-line ==
The translation of the lion-hunt story in the first ten years of Amenhotep's reign is:

(following introduction): Amenhotep's name and Tiye's name;
List of the lions brought in His Majesty by his own shooting, beginning with year 1-(="renpet") up to year X. Lions fierce 102 (!)

=== Line-by-line ===
line.5.5	r Aa1 t E22 Z2ss list-of lions
line.6	W25 N35 N35 U36 Z1 f m brought-in majesty-his by
line.6.5	t F29 t f I10 O34 f M8 A D36 Y1 his-shooting his-own beginning
line.7	m M4 t N5 Z1 nfr i i t r M4 t N5 V20 E22 with year1 up to year10 lions
line.8	H s Aa18 A Z7 Z1 Z1 fierce 102

== List of the five scarabs ==
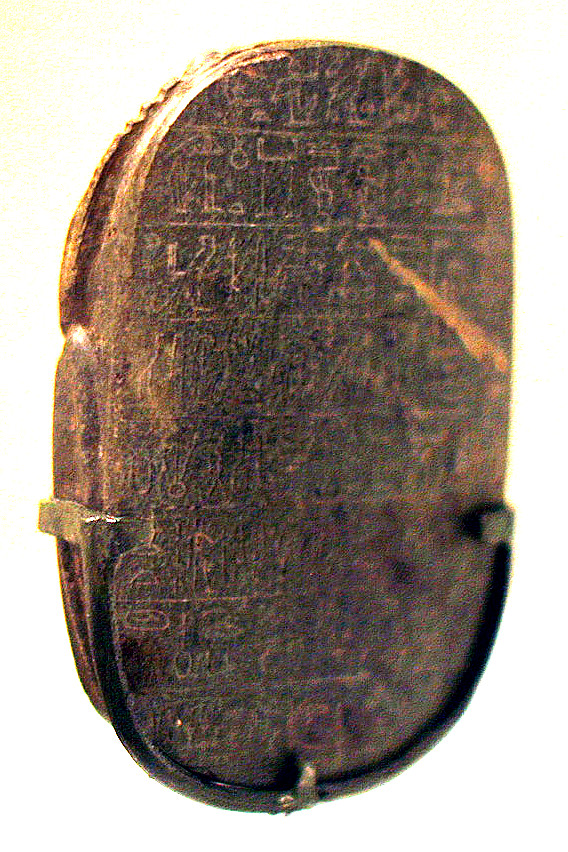
(Example scarab bottom):Medium to moderate size scarab, with horizontal text. (Text always reads into the faces of animals, right-to-left, this scarab.)

1. The Wild-Cattle Hunt by Amenhotep III in the IInd Year of his Reign-(2nd year)
2. Scarab Giving the Names of the Father and Mother of Queen Ti
3. The Lion-Hunts of Amenhotep III During the First Ten Years of his Reign
4. The Arrival in Egypt of Gilukhipa, the Mitannian Bride of Amenhotep III, in the Tenth Year of his Reign
5. The Construction of a Lake in Western Thebes for Queen Ti by Amenhotep III in the Eleventh Year of his Reign

== Complete scarab BM 4096 ==
Introduction with wife Tiye, and entire 8 lines of scarab BM 4096:

Horus the living one, bull mighty diademed(crowned) with Maat(Truth), Nebty-(Two Ladies), Stablisher of laws, pacifier of the Two Lands, Horus of Gold, Mighty of Thigh, Smiter of the Nomads, King of the South and the North, Neb-Maat-Ra, Son of Amenhotep, Governor of Thebes, Given Life, King's Woman, Tiye, Living One-("Living One, Like Ra", Ra not on this scarab); (in Tutankhamun's reign for Ankhesenamun, "May She Live")

List of the lions brought in His Majesty by his own shooting, beginning with year 1 up to year X. Lions fierce 102 (!)

line.1	S34 G5 E1 D40 G17 N28 H6 Living-Horus bull-mighty with crowned Maat
line.2	G16 S29 mn N35 Y1 h Q3 Z2ss G1 S29 W11 r H Two Ladies eStablisher laws pacifier
line.3	D41 N16 N16 G8 O29 D36 F23 V28 A24 S22 G1 T14 Z3 M23 L2 two-lands Horus-of-Gold mighty-of-thigh smiter of-Nomads King-South-North
line.4	< N5 V30 C10 > G39 N5 < i mn N35 R4 S38 R19 > X8 S34 M23 N41 X1 son-of governor-Thebes given-life Kings-Wife
line.5	< U33 N21 N21 M17 M17 > S34 U33 Living-Tiye Tiye-may-She-Be-Forever-Living-(Youthful)
line.5.5	r Aa1 t E22 Z2ss list-of lions
line.6	W25 N35 N35 U36 Z1 f m Brought-In majesty-his by
line.6.5	t F29 t f I10 O34 f M8 A D36 Y1 his-shooting his-own beginning
line.7	m M4 t N5 Z1 nfr i i t r M4 t N5 V20 E22 with year1 up to year10 lions
line.8	H s Aa18 A Z7 Z1 Z1 fierce 102

Other scarabs with this title have variations of what hieroglyphs are added or omitted because of the multiple copies made of this scarab series. (The Two Ladies are goddesses/gods of the South and North.)

== Bibliography ==
- C. Blankenberg-van Delden, 1969. The large commemorative scarabs of Amenhotep III. Documenta et Monumenta Orientis Antiqui, Vol. 15. Leiden: E.J. Brill. (hardover, ISBN 978-90-04-00474-0)
- Kerrigan, 2009. The Ancients in Their Own Words, Michael Kerrigan, Fall River Press, Amber Books Ltd, c 2009. (hardcover, ISBN 978-1-4351-0724-3)
- Budge, 1989 (reprint, 1893, 1925) The Mummy, A Handbook of Egyptian Funerary Archaeology, E. A. Wallis Budge, 1989, (1893, 1925), Dover Publications, (Chapter on 'Scarabs', subsection: Historical or Memorial Scarabs of Amenhotep III.) (softcover, ISBN 0-486-25928-5)
- Zauzich, 1992. Hieroglyphs Without Mystery: An Introduction to Ancient Egyptian Writing, Karl-Theodor Zauzich, English translation, Ann Macy Roth, c. 1992, University of Texas Press, Austin. Appendix-(problem solutions), "Hieroglyphic Sign List"-(abbreviated Gardiner's), Museum Numbers and Photo Credits for the Objects Discussed-(12 entries); 121 pages. (see for verb usage of: "May She Live") (softcover, ISBN 0-292-79804-0)
