= Hieroglyphs Without Mystery =

Text by Karl-Theodor Zauzich

The Egyptian hieroglyphic text Hieroglyphs Without Mystery: An Introduction to Ancient Egyptian Writing, is one of the modern primers on the Egyptian language hieroglyphs, from the late 20th to early 21st century. The text is a German text authored by Karl-Theodor Zauzich, c. 1992, and translated into English by Ann Macy Roth.

The text is built upon only four chapters and an Appendix:

1. Generalities
2. The Writing System
3. Examples
4. Conclusion
5. Appendixes

== Examples ==
Six of the examples are from Tutankhamun, including a white Alabaster Chest-(Cairo JE 61762), with hieroglyphs down the top center and an end text of three vertical columns. Three cartouches and a horizontal register adorn the box's end text. The horizontal text-(below the cartouches), uses three hieroglyphs that can elucidate a meaning for a hieroglyph block from the scarab artifact, The lion hunts of Amenhotep III during the first ten years of his reign. It is an addition below Ankhesenamun cartouche, a wife of Tutankamun. The three hieroglyphs, ti, ankh, and renpet, U33, S34, M7, are used.

The text under Ankhesenamun's name:

S34 U33 M7 U33

is translated as:

"may she live"
"may she be (forever) young"

The ti is described as a "grammatical ending", (for third person, feminine, singular): it is: "a special group of endings attached to verbs in order to express a wish".

The standard version of analytic Egyptian hieroglyphs is based upon the 26 categories of the Gardiner's Sign List, (about 700 signs). That categorization is still the basic standard. The approach in Hieroglyphs Without Mystery is an abbreviated Gardiner's Sign List, categorized and described as a 'study reference appendix'-(16 pages), with many of the most common or more important Egyptian hieroglyphs.

With the older styles and outlines of hieroglyphs being redone and rethought by modern Egytologists, new approaches to books on the Egyptian language and the hieroglyphs have been tried.

The text contains a short 'answer key' to exercises.
