= Scarab (artifact) =

Scarab beetle-shaped amulets and impression seals of ancient Egypt

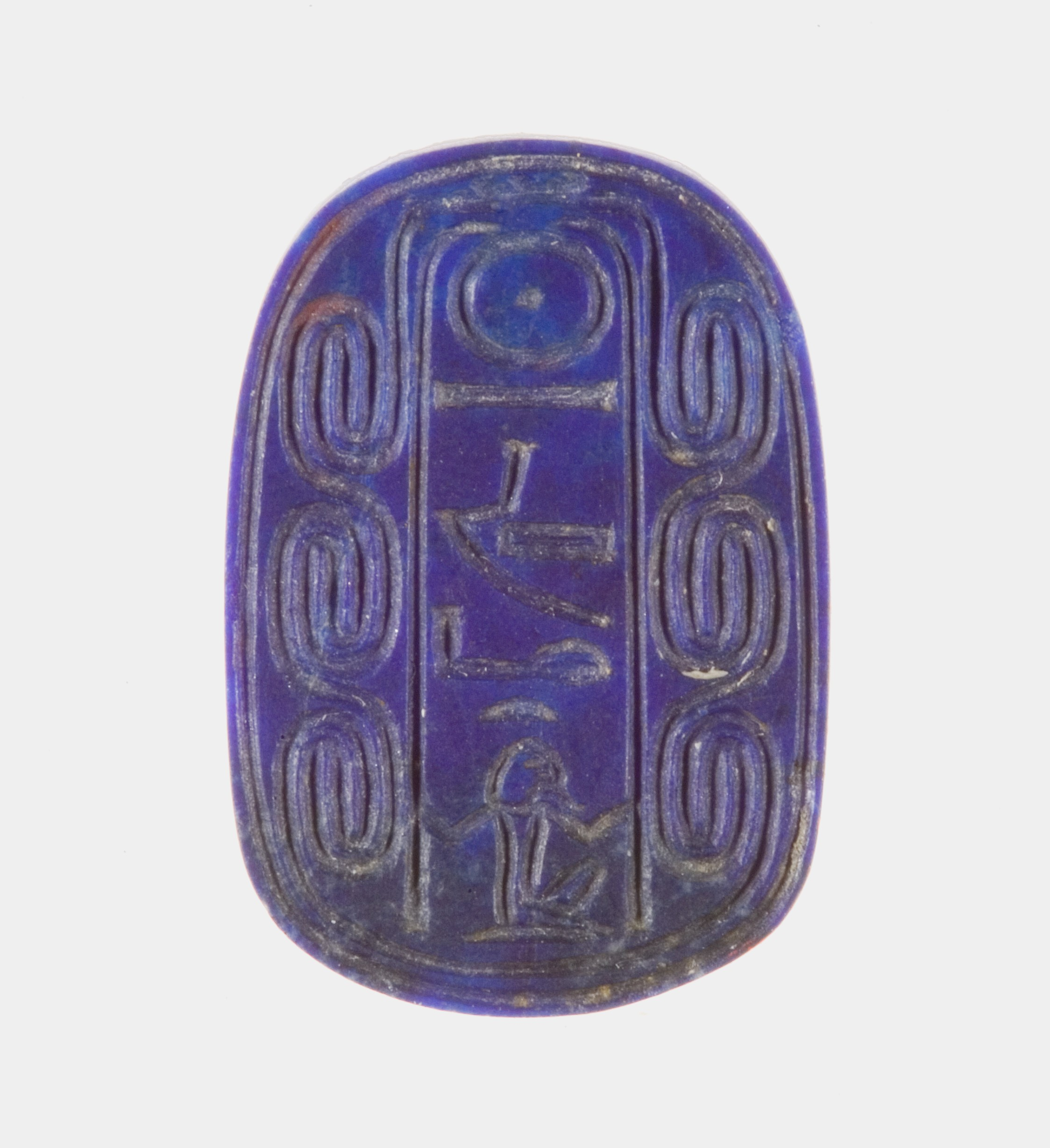
Lapis lazuli scarab belonging to Sithathoriunet with the name of Amenemhat III, 1887–1813 BC, MET

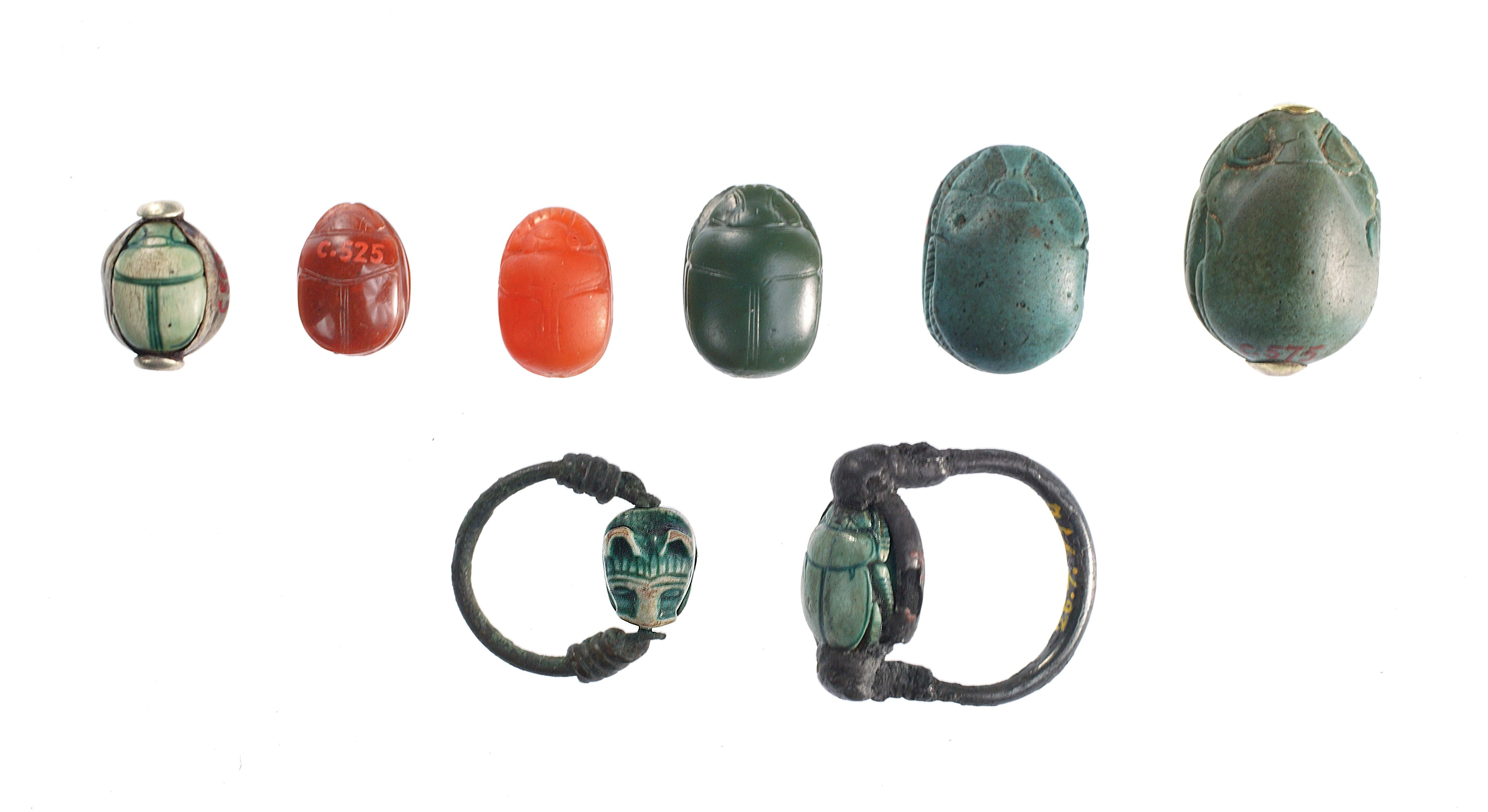
Group of scarabs, MET

Scarabs are amulets and impression seals shaped according to the eponymous beetles, which were widely popular throughout ancient Egypt. They survive in large numbers today, and through their inscriptions and typology, these artifacts prove to be an important source of information for archaeologists and historians of ancient Egypt, representing a significant body of its art.

Though primarily worn as amulets and sometimes rings, scarabs were also inscribed for use as personal or administrative seals or were incorporated into other kinds of jewelry. Some scarabs were created for political or diplomatic purposes to commemorate or advertise royal achievements. Additionally, scarabs held religious significance and played a role in Egyptian funerary practices.

== Dating and evolution ==
Likely due to their connections to the Egyptian god Khepri, amulets in the form of scarab beetles became enormously popular in Ancient Egypt by the early Middle Kingdom (approx. 2000 BC) and remained popular for the rest of the pharaonic period and beyond.

Starting in the middle Bronze Age, other ancient peoples of the Mediterranean and the Middle East imported scarabs from Egypt and also produced scarabs in Egyptian or local styles, especially in the Levant.

By the end of the First Intermediate Period (about 2055 BC) scarabs had become extremely common. They largely replaced cylinder seals and circular "button seals" with simple geometric designs. Throughout the period in which they were made, scarabs were often engraved with the names of pharaohs and other royal figures. In the Middle Kingdom, scarabs were also engraved with the names and titles of officials, to be used as official seals. During the New Kingdom and Third Intermediate Period, scarabs with short prayers or mottos became popular, though these scarabs are somewhat difficult to translate. There are also scarabs that depict hunting scenes.

== Description and materials ==
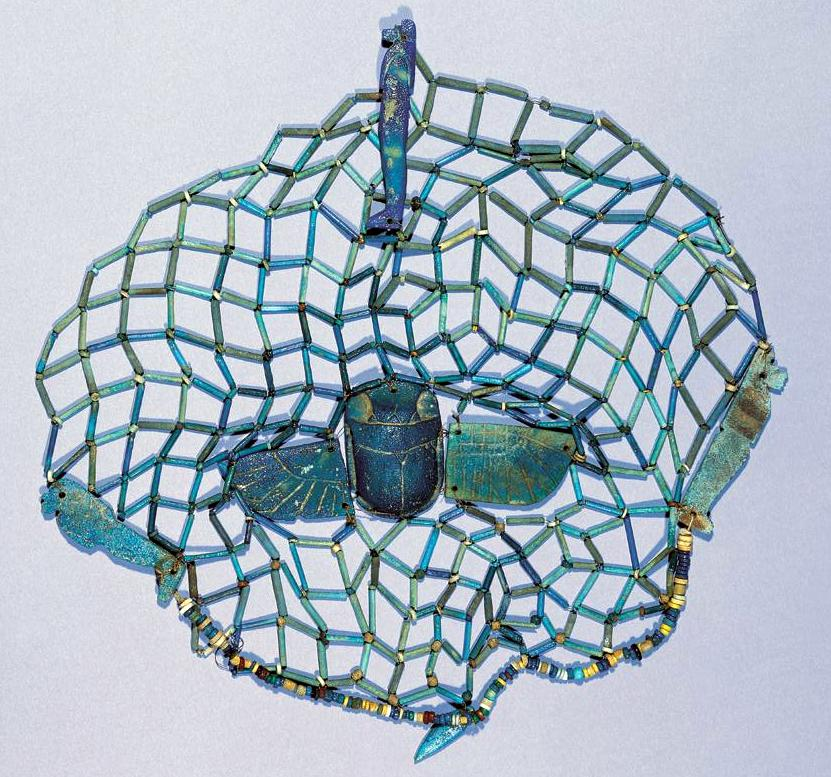
Faience pectoral scarab with spread wings and bead net, Royal Pump Room, Harrogate

Scarabs were typically carved or molded in the form of a scarab beetle (usually identified as Scarabaeus sacer) with varying degrees of naturalism but usually at least indicating the head, wing case and legs but with a flat base. The base was usually inscribed with designs or hieroglyphs to form an impression seal. They were usually drilled from end to end to allow them to be strung on a thread or incorporated into a swivel ring. The common length for standard scarabs is between 6 mm and 40 mm and most are between 10 mm and 20 mm. Larger scarabs were made from time to time for particular purposes, such as the commemorative scarabs of Amenhotep III.

Scarabs were generally either carved from stone, or molded from Egyptian faience, a type of Ancient Egyptian sintered-quartz ceramic. Once carved, they would typically be glazed blue or green and then fired. The most common stone used for scarabs was a form of steatite, a soft stone that becomes hard when fired (forming enstatite), or porcelain. In contrast, hardstone scarabs most commonly were composed of green jasper, amethyst and carnelian.

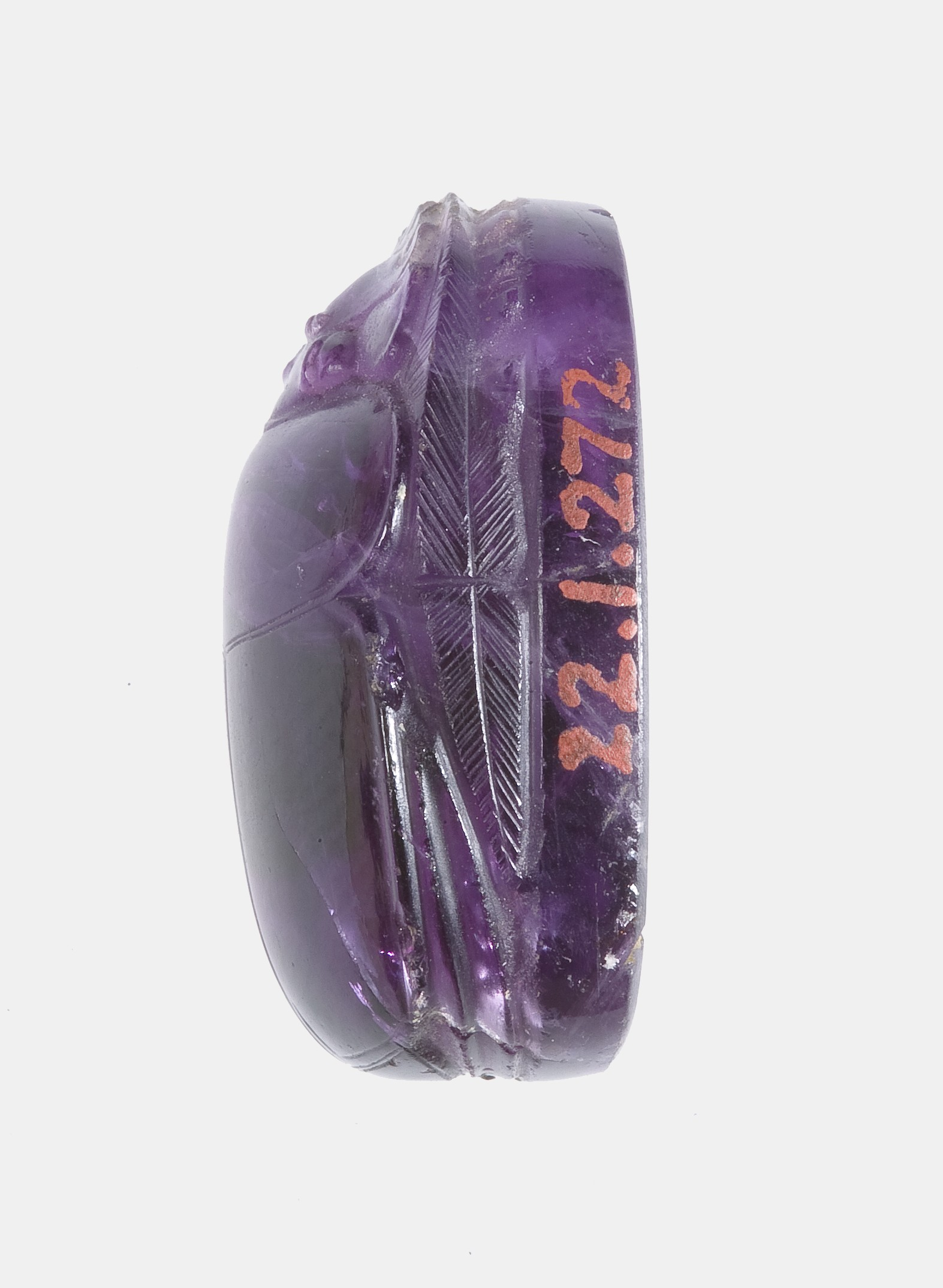
Ancient Egyptian amethyst scarab

From the late Old Kingdom onwards, scarab rings developed from simple scarabs tied to fingers with threads into rings with scarab bezels in the Middle Kingdom, and further into rings with cast scarabs in the New Kingdom, typically strung on gold wire rather than string. Bezels emerged during the Old Kingdom period, often as amulets which were meant to represent Ra, the Egyptian solar god. Scarabs used for jewelry and rings were often composed of glazed steatite, which was a popular medium in ancient Egypt, though the glaze on many of these rings has been eroded over time due to weathering.

While the majority of scarabs would originally have been green or blue, much of the colored glazes have become discolored or erased by the elements over time, leaving most steatite scarabs appearing white or brown.

== Religious and historical significance ==
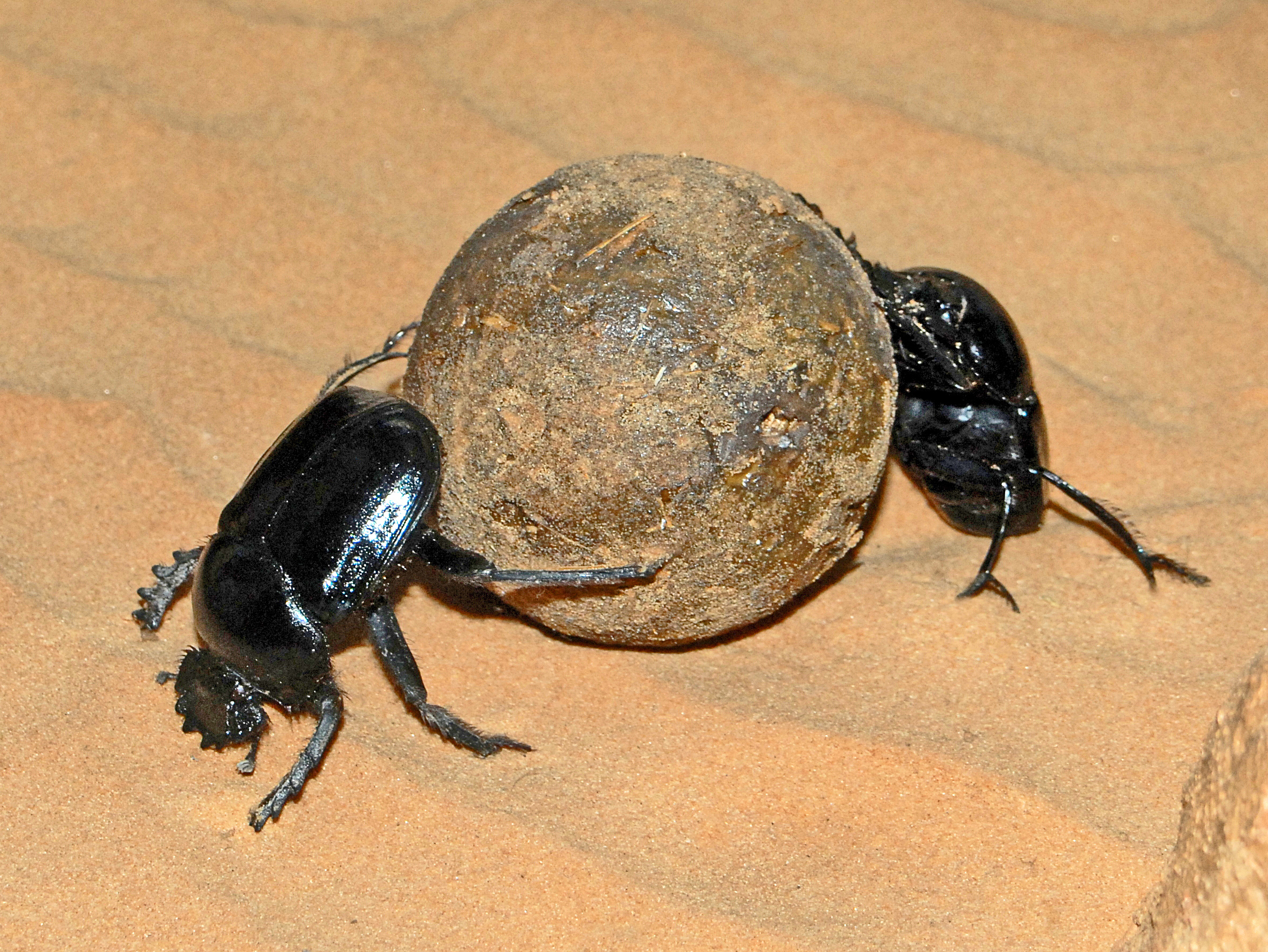
Scarabs are identified as the dung beetle Scarabaeus sacer, pictured here rolling a ball of dung.

In ancient Egypt, the Scarab Beetle was a highly significant symbolic representation of the divine manifestation of the morning sun. The Egyptian god Khepri was believed to roll the sun across the sky each day at daybreak. In a similar fashion, some beetles of the family Scarabaeidae use their legs to roll dung into balls. Ancient Egyptians believed this action was symbolic of the sun's east to west journey across the sky. Thus, the scarab was seen as a reflection of the eternal cycle of life and was characterized as representing the idea of rebirth and regeneration.

The scarab has ties to themes of manifestation and growth, and scarabs have been found all across Egypt which originate from many different periods in Egyptian history. Scarabs have also been found inside of sunken ships, like one discovered in Uluburun, Turkey, which was inscribed with the name of the Egyptian queen Nefertiti. This scarab was among many luxury items excavated from the wreckage. Its unique inscription provides a framework of time for when the sinking took place. This discovery gives ancient historians insight into the nature of Bronze Age trading goods and commercial networks of exchange within the Mediterranean.

== Types of scarabs ==
=== Funerary ===
Scarab amulets were sometimes placed in tombs as part of the deceased's personal effects or jewelry, though not all scarabs had an association with ancient Egyptian funerary practices. There are, however, three types of scarabs that seem to be specifically related to ancient funerary practices: heart scarabs, pectoral scarabs and naturalistic scarabs.

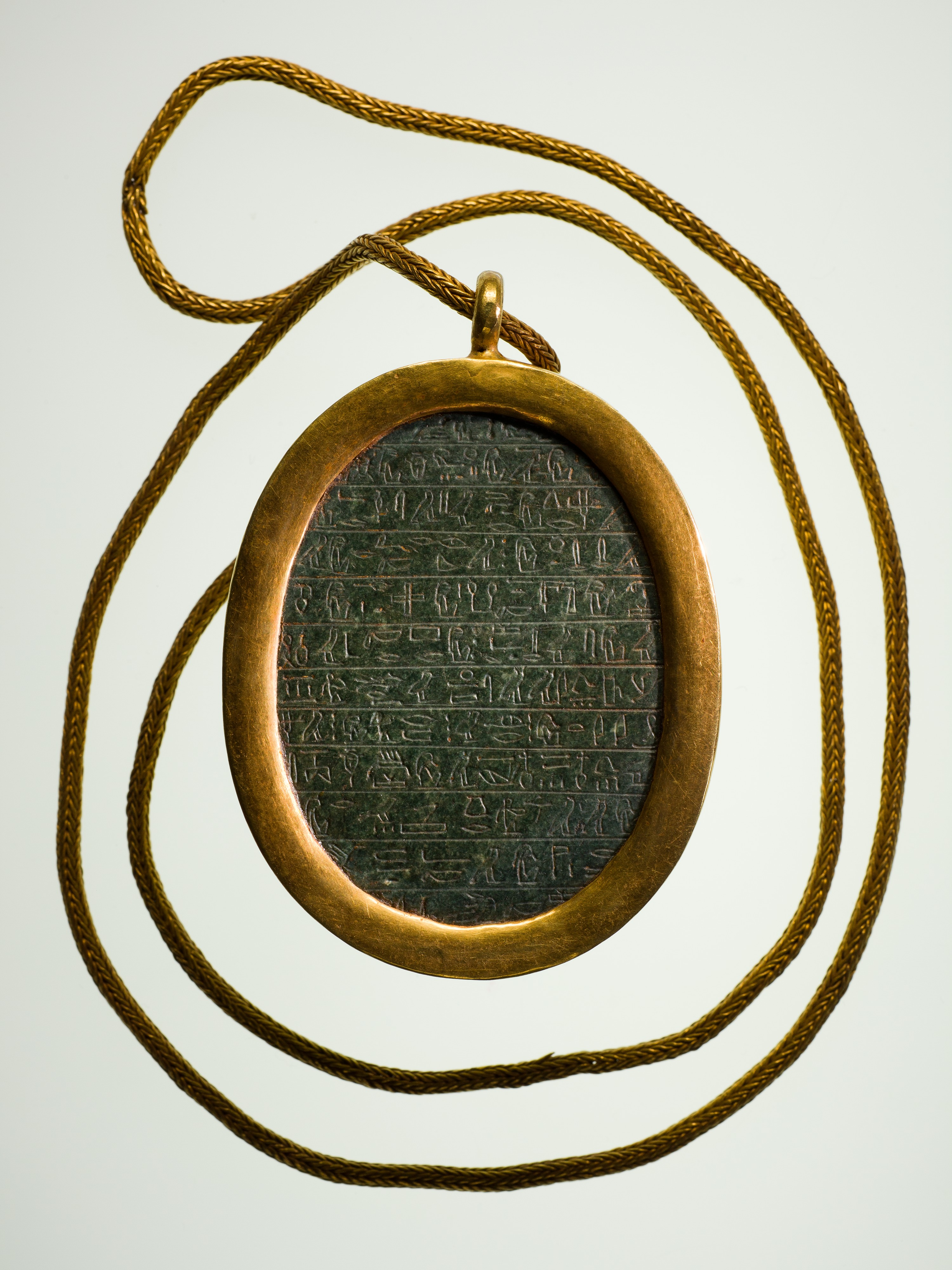
The Heart Scarab of Hatnefer, on display at the MET Museum of Art

Heart scarabs became popular in the early New Kingdom and remained in use until the Third Intermediate Period. They are typically 4 cm-12 cm long, and are often made from dark green or black stone not pierced for suspension. The heart was the most significant internal organ to ancient Egyptians, as they believed it to be the center of intellect and the mind. Therefore, the heart was left inside the deceased's body during the mummification process, while the other viscera were removed for separate preservation. To determine safe passage into the underworld, ancient Egyptians performed the "weighing of the heart" rite, which utilized heart scarabs. Heart scarabs were often hung around the mummy's neck with a gold wire and the scarab itself was held in a gold frame. The base of a heart scarab was usually carved, either directly or on a gold plate fixed to the base, with hieroglyphs which name the deceased and repeat some or all of spell 30B from the Book of the Dead. The spell commands the deceased's heart not to give evidence against the deceased when he/she is being judged by the gods of the underworld.

From the Twenty-fifth Dynasty onwards, large (typically 3–8 cm long), relatively flat uninscribed pectoral scarabs were sewn together with a pair of separately made outstretched wings, onto the chests of mummies via holes formed at the edge of the scarab. Pectoral scarabs appear to be associated with the god Khepri, who is often depicted in the same form.

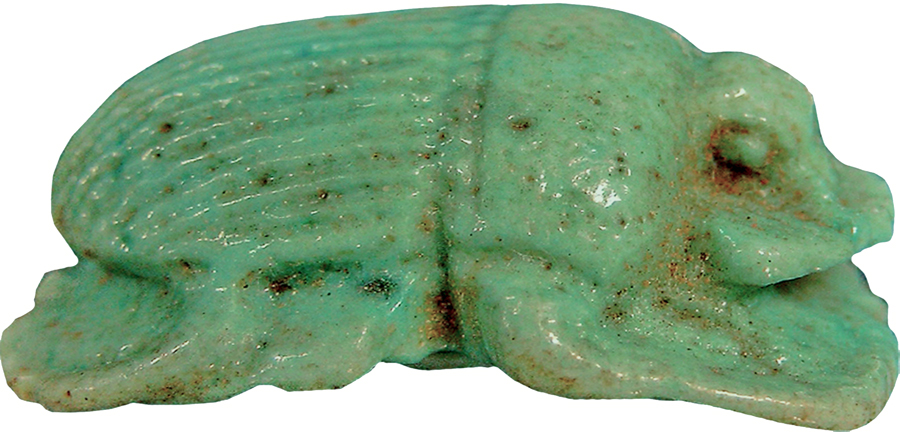
Egyptian faience naturalistic scarab, 665–342 BC, Late Period, Walters Art Museum

Naturalistic scarabs are relatively small (typically 2 cm to 3 cm long), made from a wide variety of hardstones and Egyptian Faience, and are distinguished from other scarabs by their naturalistic carved three dimensional bases, which often also include an integral suspension loop running widthways. Groups of these funerary scarabs, often made from different materials, formed part of the battery of amulets which were believed by ancient Egyptians to protect mummies throughout the Late Period.

Ancient Egyptians believed that when a person died and underwent their final judgement, the gods of the underworld would ask many detailed and intricate questions which had to be answered precisely and ritually, according to the Book of the Dead. Since many ancient Egyptians were illiterate, even placing a copy of this scroll in their coffin would not be enough to protect them from judgment for giving a wrong answer. As a result, the priests would read the questions and their appropriate answers to the beetle, which would then be killed, mummified, and placed in the ear of the deceased. It was believed that when the gods then asked their questions, the ghostly scarab would whisper the correct answer into the ear of the supplicant, who could then answer the gods wisely and correctly.

=== Commemorative ===
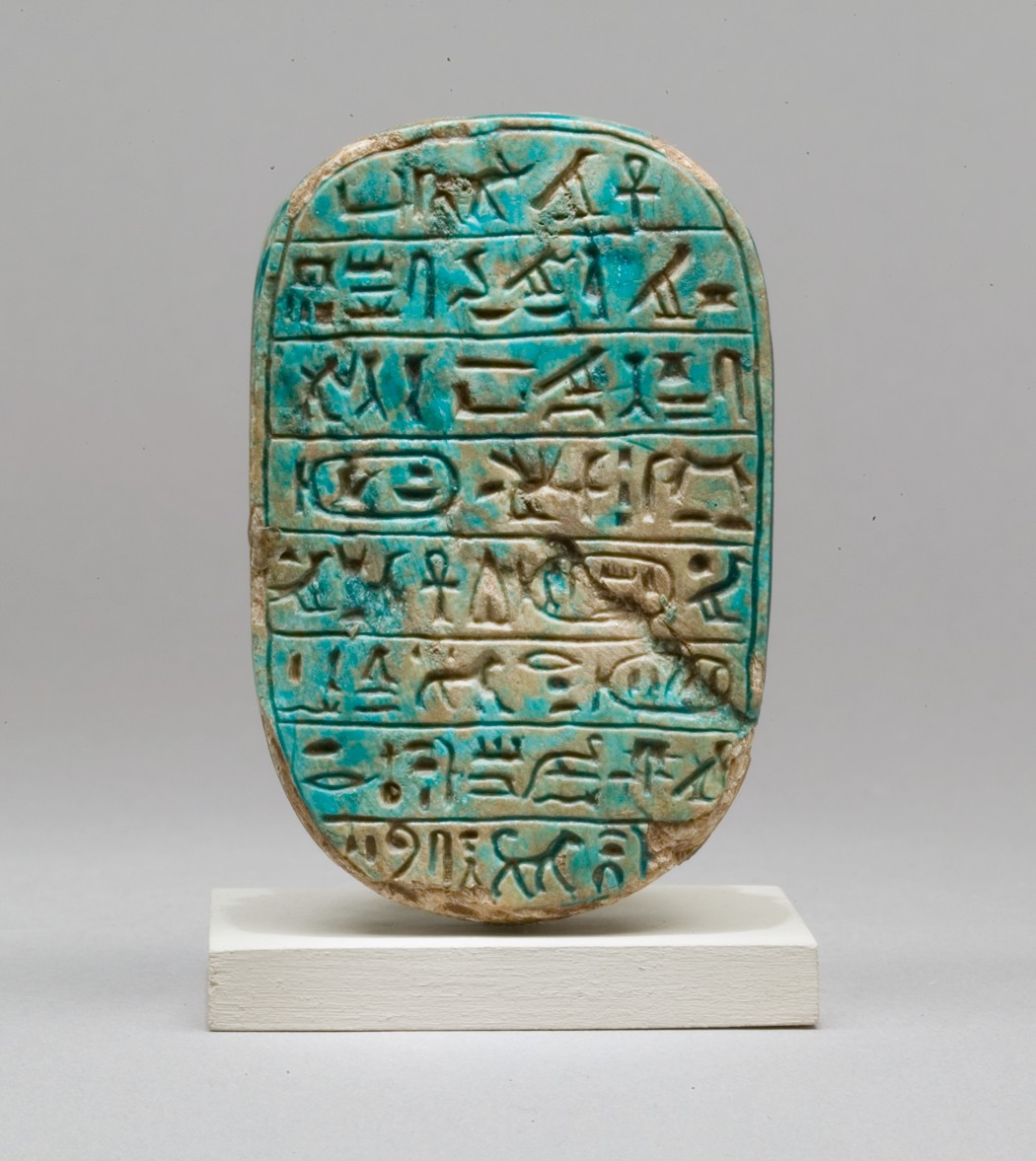
Glazed steatite commemorative scarab for Amenhotep III recording a lion hunt with the number of lions slain, 1390–1352 BC, MET

Amenhotep III (the immediate predecessor of Akhenaten) is famed for having commemorative scarabs manufactured. These were large (mostly between 3.5 cm and 10 cm long) and made of steatite, a grayish-green or brown colored talc. These scarabs were intricately crafted, created under royal supervision, and carried lengthy inscriptions describing one of five important events in his reign (all of which mention his queen, Tiye). More than 200 of these have survived, and the locations in which they have been discovered suggest they were sent out as royal gifts and propaganda in support of Egyptian diplomatic activities. The crafting of these large scarabs was a continuation of an earlier Eighteenth Dynasty tradition of making scarabs to celebrate specific royal achievements, such as the erection of obelisks at major temples during the reign of Thuthmosis III. This tradition was revived centuries later during the Twenty-fifth Dynasty, when the Kushite pharaoh Shabaka (721–707 BC) had large scarabs made to commemorate his victories in imitation of those previously produced for Amenhotep III.

=== Royal name ===
Scarabs are often found inscribed with the names of pharaohs and more rarely with the names of their queens and other members of the royal family. Generally, there is a correlation between how long a king or queen ruled and how many scarabs have been found bearing one or more of their names. Famously, a golden scarab of Nefertiti was discovered in the Uluburun ship wreck. Most scarabs bearing a royal name can reasonably be dated to the period in which the person named lived. However, there are a number of important exceptions. Scarabs have been found bearing the names of pharaohs of the Old Kingdom (particularly of well-known kings such as Khufu, Khafre and Unas). It is now believed these were produced in later periods, most probably during the Twenty-fifth Dynasty or Twenty-sixth Dynasty, when there was considerable interest in and imitation of the works of well-established kings of the past.

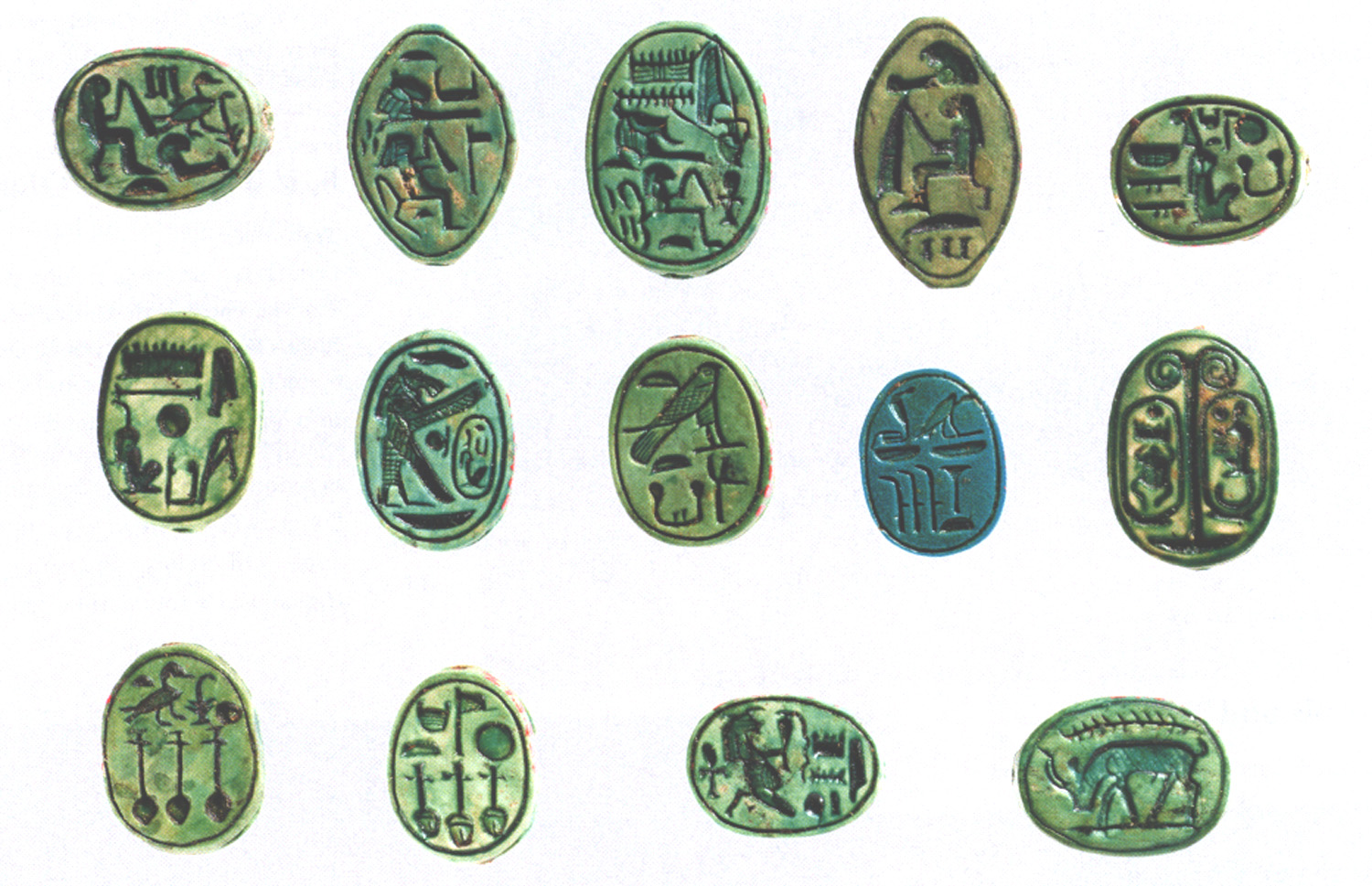
Scarabs with the throne names of Thutmose III and Hatshepsut, MET

Scarabs have also been found in vast numbers bearing the throne name of the New Kingdom King Thutmose III (1504–1450 BC) Men Kheper Re. Many of these scarabs date from the long and successful reign of this warrior pharaoh or shortly thereafter, but the majority do not. Like all pharaohs, Thuthmosis was regarded as a god after his death. Unlike most pharaohs, his cult, centered on his mortuary temple, seems to have continued for years, if not centuries. As a result, many scarabs bearing the inscription Men Kheper Re are likely to commemorate Thuthmosis III but may have been produced hundreds of years later. Later pharaohs adopted the same throne name (including Piye of the Twenty-fifth Dynasty, 747–716 BC) leading to some confusion. The hieroglyphs making Men Kheper Re seem to have become regarded as a protective charm in themselves and were inscribed on scarabs without any specific reference to Thuthmosis III. It can be doubted that in many cases the carver understood the meaning of the inscription but reproduced it blindly. On a lesser scale the same may be true of the throne name of Rameses II (1279–1212 BC) User Maat Re ("the justice of Ra is powerful"), which is commonly found on scarabs which otherwise do not appear to date from his reign. The birth names of pharaohs were also popular names among private individuals and so, for example, a scarab simply bearing the name "Amenhotep" need not be associated with any particular king who also bore that name.

The significance of a scarab bearing a royal name is unclear and probably changed over time and from scarab to scarab. Many may simply have been made privately in honor of a ruler during or after his lifetime. Some may also have been royal gifts. In some cases, scarabs with royal names may have been official seals or badges of office, perhaps connected with the royal estates or household. Others, although relatively few, may have been personal seals owned by the royal individual named on them. As the king fulfilled many different roles in ancient Egyptian society, so scarabs naming a pharaoh may have had a direct or indirect connection with a wide range of private and public activities.

=== Name and title ===
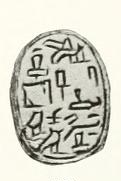
Scarab seal of the ancient Egyptian keeper of the seal (i.e. treasurer) Senebsumai. The inscription says: "Royal sealer, companion, keeper of the seal, Senebsumai". From Kahun, early 13th Dynasty, Second Intermediate Period, now likely in the Petrie Museum

During the late Middle Kingdom, changes in the administration led to scarabs being inscribed with the names and titles of non-royal individuals, usually officials. These scarabs exhibit precision unmatched in other periods, including early Middle Kingdom, Second Intermediate Period, and start of the 18th Dynasty. Although the scarab ceased its utilitarian use as a personal seal soon after the collapse of the Middle Kingdom, it retained its religious and magical importance throughout the dynastic period.

=== Canaanite ===
Canaanite scarabs imitate contemporary Egyptian late Middle Kingdom designs, while also introducing new decorative elements and symbols. Scarabs made by Canaanite artisans show extensive use of linear and cross hatching on the bodies of the various figures, representations of native animals, and the use of the palm branch.

Anra scarabs are scarab seals dating to the Second Intermediate Period. As anra scarabs have overwhelmingly been found in Palestine (~80%), it has been suggested it was marketed by the contemporaneous 15th Dynasty for the Canaanites.

=== Phoenician ===
Phoenician seal engravers adopted the scarab from the Egyptians in the period of the Achaemenid Empire, from the later sixth century BC to the mid-fourth century BC. The majority of these scarabs have been unearthed in the western Phoenician (Punic) burial grounds of Carthage, Sardinia, and Ibiza, with numerous others originating in the Eastern Mediterranean. The city of Tharros on Sardinia was a major center of production and distribution, and scarabs were transported to the Etruscans in the 5th century by Greek and Phoenician merchants. The Etruscan scarab was most popular in Vulci and Tarquinia from the last decades of the 6th century BC.

Phoenician scarabs were carved with not only Egyptian themes, but also Etruscan and western Greek imagery. The innovations include Egyptianizing (the standard of Phoenicia), native Levantine (more Syrian in style and subject matter), and Hellenizing (mainly following late Archaic Greek subject matter and styles, also called Graeco-Phoenician).

== Gallery ==
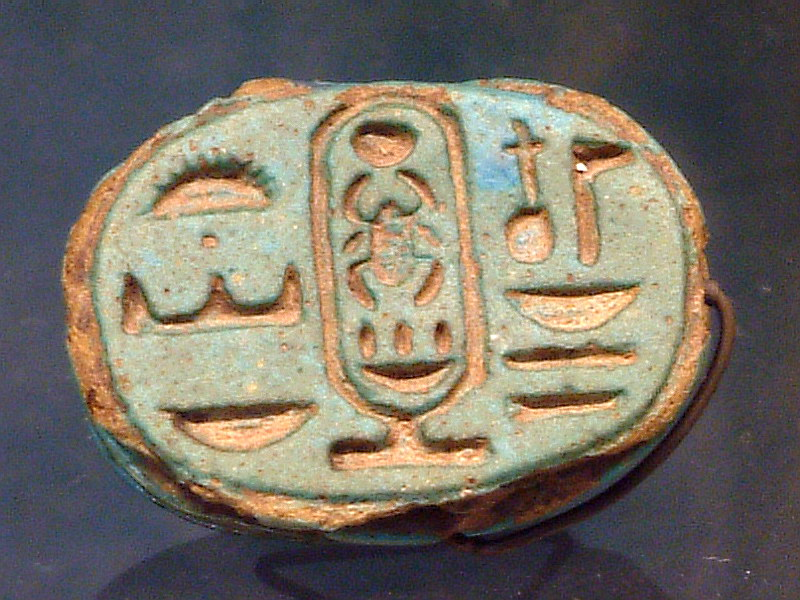
Signet ring, with cartouche of the Pharaoh Tutankhamun

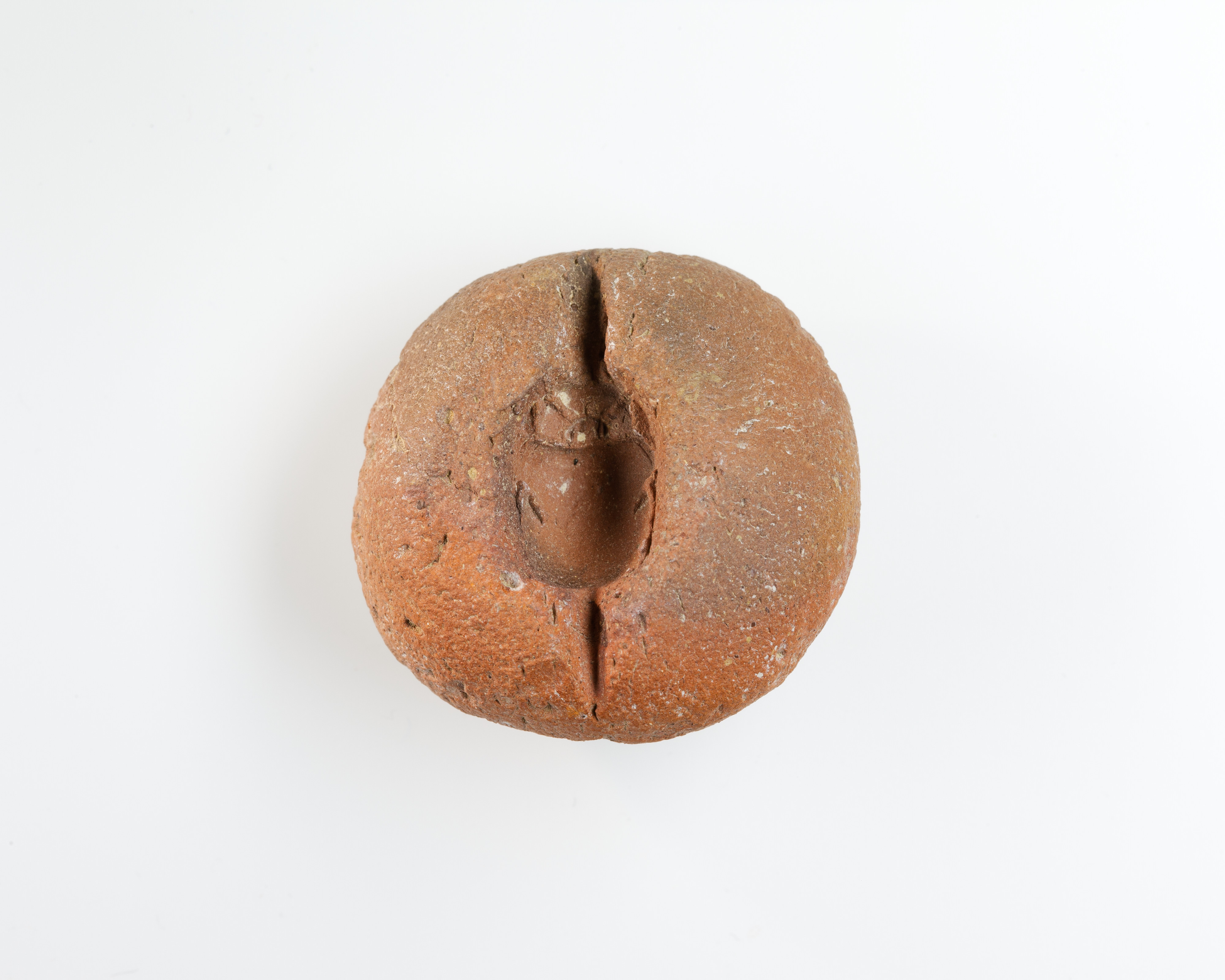
Mould for a scarab, MET

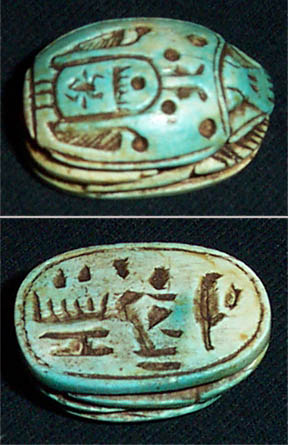
A modern scarab produced for the tourist trade.

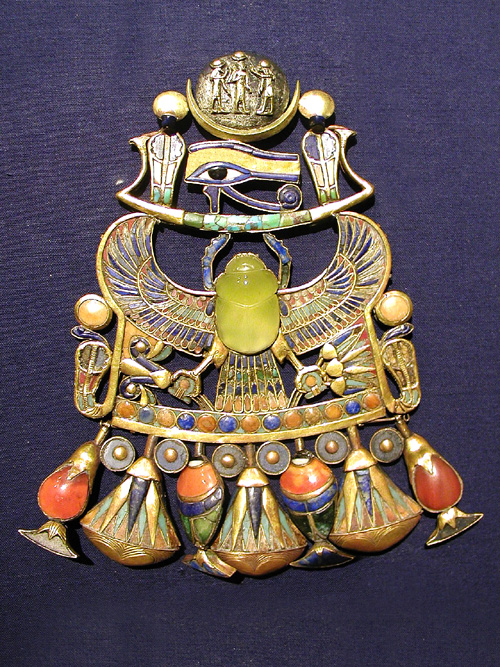
A pendant in the shape of a winged scarab carrying the Eye of Horus, from the treasury of Tut's tomb

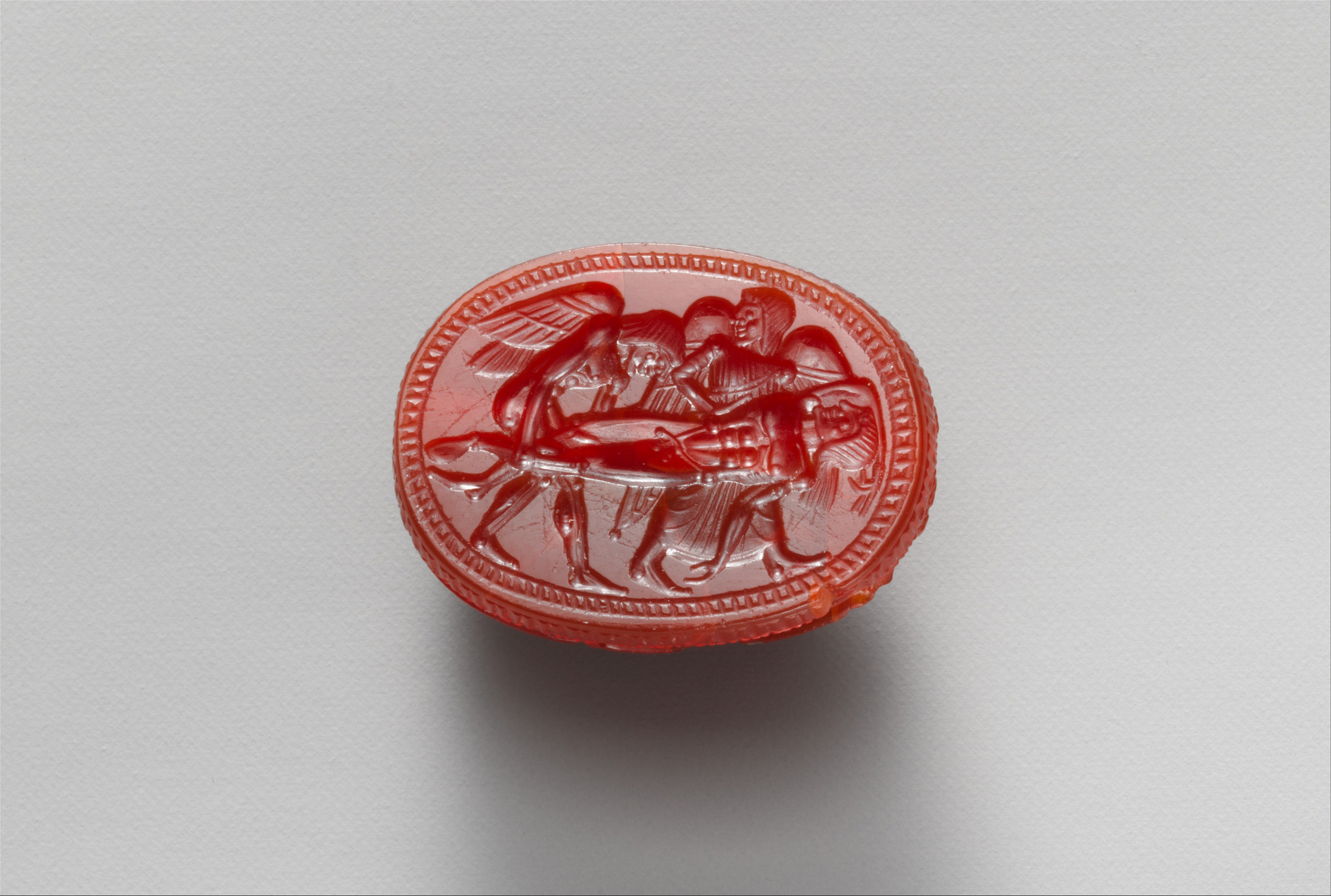
Carnelian Etruscan scarab 500–450 BC

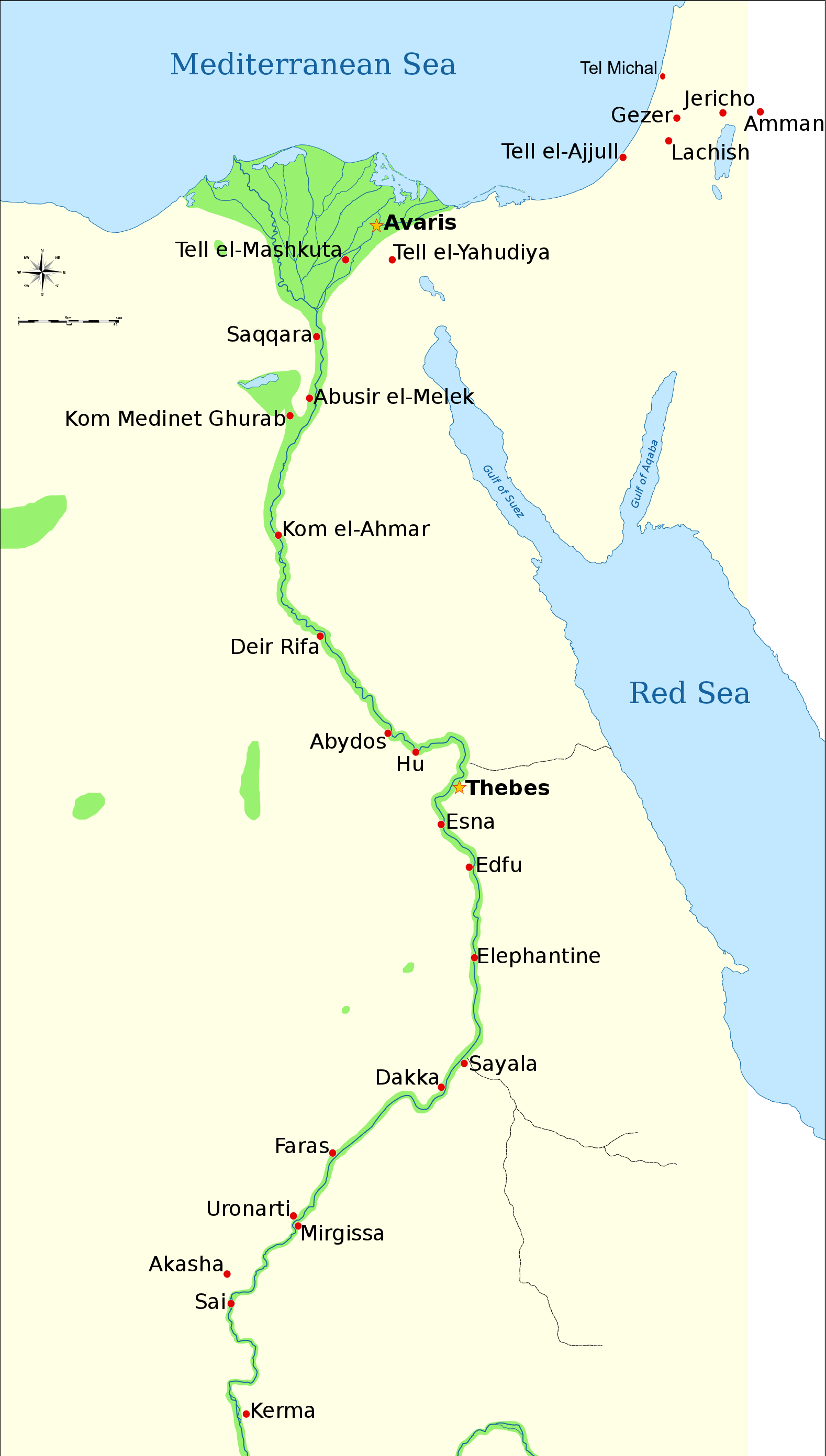
Sheshi royal scarab locations in the Levant, Egypt and Nubia. Scarabs are the only evidence for his reign

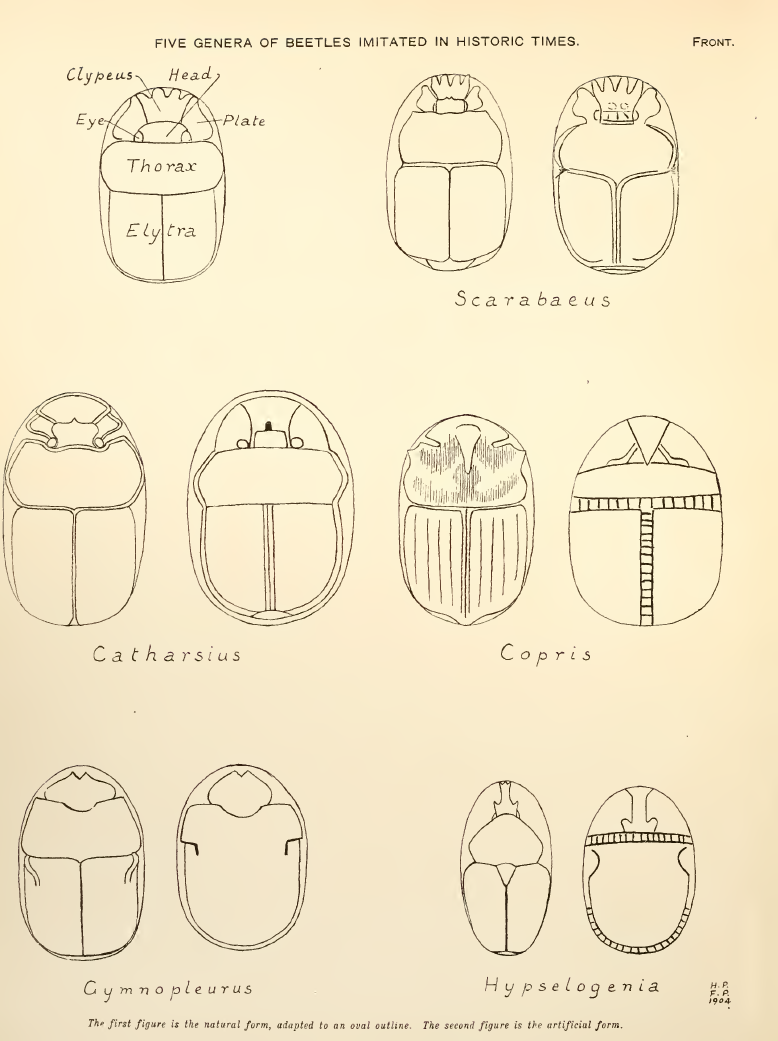
Scarab genera, Petrie "Scarabs"

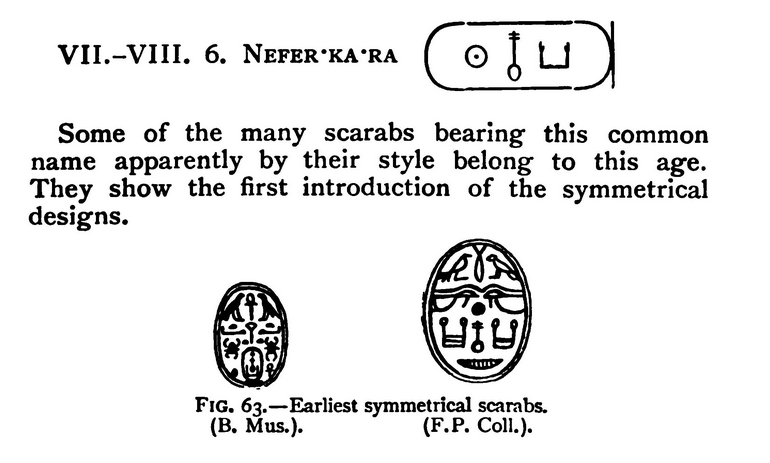
Introduction of symmetry, scarabs, Petrie "A History of Egypt"

== Literary and popular culture reference ==
- P. G. Wodehouse's first Blandings novel – Something Fresh (1915) – involves the pilfering of a rare Egyptian scarab (a "Cheops of the Fourth Dynasty") as a key plot device.
- In British crime novelist Dorothy L. Sayers's novel Murder Must Advertise a catapulted scarab is the murder weapon.
- The rock band Journey uses various types of scarabs as their main logo and in the cover art of the albums Departure, Captured, Escape, Greatest Hits, Arrival, Generations, Revelation, and The Essential Journey.
- The Dutch print-maker M. C. Escher (1898–1972) created a wood engraving in 1935 depicting two scarabs or dung beetles.
- In Stephen Sommers' The Mummy (1999), the scarab is used as a deadly, ancient beetle that eats the internal and external organs, killing whom ever it comes into contact with.
- In The Twilight Zone episode Queen of the Nile, the main character Pamela Morris has an ancient scarab beetle amulet that can drain the youth of anyone she places it on, enabling her to remain young forever. Morris tells her final victim that she got it from "the pharaohs, who understood its power."
- In Disney's animated movie Aladdin, the location of the Cave of Wonders is revealed when two halves of a scarab beetle are joined.
- Scarabs are used as the monetary unit of planet Sauria (originally known as Dinosaur Planet) in the 2002 video game Star Fox Adventures.
- Scarabs appear in droves in Tomb Raider: The Last Revelation. They deal damage to Lara Croft throughout the game.
- In Dungeons and Dragons, there is a magic item called the Scarab of Protection. It protects its wearer against deathly curses and similar effects, usually caused by undead monsters and necromancy. However, each scarab can only stop so many of these attacks before it is destroyed, crumbling to dust.

== See also ==
- Cylinder seal
- Impression seal
- Stamp seal

== Sources ==
- Andrews, Carol, 1994. Amulets of Ancient Egypt, chapter 4: Scarabs for the living and funerary Scarabs, pp. 50–59, Andrews, Carol, 1993, University of Texas Press; (softcover, ISBN 0-292-70464-X)
- "Ancient Egyptian Scarab Amulet with Wings". australianmuseum.net.au. 22 September 2009.
- Ben-Tor, Daphna. "Egyptian-Levantine Relations And Chronology In The Middle Bronze Age: Scarab Research." The Synchronisation Of Civilisations In The Eastern Mediterranean In The Second Millennium B.C. II. N.p.: n.p., n.d. 239". Academia.edu.
- Blankenberg-van Delden, C., 1969. The large commemorative Scarabs of Amenhotep III. Documenta et Monumenta Orientis Antiqui, Vol. 15. Leiden: E.J. Brill. ISBN 978-90-04-00474-0.
- Budge, 1977, (1926). The Dwellers on the Nile, E. A. Wallis Budge, (Dover Publications), c 1977, (originally, c 1926, by Religious Tract Society, titled as: The Dwellers on the Nile: Chapter of the Life, History, Religion and Literature of the Ancient-Egyptians); pp 265–268: "account of the hunting of wild cattle by Amenhetep III", "taken from a great Scarab"; (there are 16 registers-(lines) of hieroglyphs); (softcover, ISBN 0-486-23501-7)
- Evans, Elaine A. (17 April 1997). "Sacred Scarab". McClung Museum. N.p. Archived from the original on 10 October 2018.
- Kerrigan, Michael. "Tiy's Wedding Scarab." The Ancients in Their Own Words. N.p.: Fall River, 2009. 54–55. Print.
- Newberry, Percy E. (1908). Scarabs: an introduction to the study of Egyptian seals and signet rings. University of Liverpool. Institute of archaeology. Egyptian antiquities. London: Archibald Constable & Co. With forty-four plates and one hundred and sixteen illustrations.
- Patch, Diana Craig. "Exhibitions: Magic in Miniature: Ancient Egyptian Scarabs, Seals & Amulets". Brooklyn Museum Archive, n.d.
- Schulz, R., Seidel, M. Egypt, The World of the Pharaohs, Eds. Regine Schulz and Matthias Seidel, (w/ 34 contributing Authors), (Konemann, Germany), c 1998. ( 2 ) Scarab seals, (as impression seals), (Top/Bottom, 1.5 cm), and "Commemorative Scarab" of Amenhotep III, (Top/Bottom hieroglyphs), p. 353. (hardcover, ISBN 3-89508-913-3)
- Sparavigna, Amelia Carolina (2009). "Ancient Egyptian Seals and Scarabs". The Ancient Seals. SSRN 2823472.
- "Stamp Scarab Seal with Winged Figures [Levant or Syria] (Bequest of W. Gedney Beatty 1941 (41.160.162))". Heilbrunn Timeline of Art History. The Metropolitan Museum of Art. 4 September 2013.
- Ward, John, and F. L. Griffith. The Sacred Beetle: A Popular Treatise on Egyptian Scarabs in Art and History. Five hundred examples of Scarabs and cylinders, the translations by F. Llewellyn Griffith. London: John Murray, 1902. OCLC 1853124
