= C. Blankenberg-van Delden =

Dutch Egyptologist (1906-1994)

- Born: 23 March 1906; Dutch East Indies
- Died: 1994 (aged 87–88); Bergen op Zoom
- Known for: The large commemorative scarabs of Amenhotep III
- Scientific career
- Academic advisors: Adolf Klasens, J.M.A. Janssen

Catharina Blankenberg-van Delden (Dutch East Indies, 23 March 1906 – Bergen op Zoom, 1994) was a Dutch Egyptologist.

== Life and work ==
Catharina van Delden grew up in the Dutch East Indies; prior to the Japanese occupation during World War II she lived in Yogyakarta. In 1946 or 1947 she married Johan Willem Blankenberg (born 26 July 1907 in Muntok). In July 1947 she was repatriated from Batavia to the Netherlands on M.S. "Kota Baroe". Her husband was killed on 14 November 1949 in Brebes (Java) during an attack on his place of work.

Blankenberg-Van Delden read Egyptology at Leiden University with Adolf Klasens starting from 1963. In 1969 she published her groundbreaking study into the commemorative scarabs of Amenhotep III. The catalogue includes all copies known at the time, including photographs or line drawings, plus transcription and translation of the texts on the scarabs.

Blankenberg-Van Delden's designation of commemorative scarabs has become standard in Egyptology: category (indicated by a letter) and a sequence number, allowing for continuous numbering of newly found scarabs. The categories are, based on the text inscribed on the "belly" of the scarab:

A. ‘Marriage’ Scarabs (text about Queen Tiye and her parents)
B. Wild Bull-Hunt Scarabs (account of a royal hunt, regnal year 2)
C. Lion-Hunt Scarabs (account of several royal hunts, regnal years 1-10)
D. Gilukhepa Scarabs (arrival of Mitanni princess Gilukhipa, regnal year 10)
E. Lake Scarabs (construction of an artificial lake for Queen Tiye, regnal year 11)
F. Forgeries
LS Lost Scarabs (scarabs that have been documented, but are now lost)

In 1976 and 1977 Blankenberg-Van Delden published additional scarabs; she transferred her materials gathered thereafter to R.J. Demarée who published them in 2011.

== Publications ==
- ‘Gedenkscarabeeën van Amenhotep III in het Rijksmuseum van Oudheden te Leiden’. Oudheidkundige mededelingen uit het Rijksmuseum van Oudheden 42 (1961), 7–12.
- The large commemorative scarabs of Amenhotep III. Documenta et Monumenta Orientis Antiqui, Vol. 15. Leiden: E.J. Brill, 1969. ISBN 978-90-04-00474-0.
- ‘De grote gedenkscarabeeën van Amenhotep III -1-’. De Ibis: [oude serie] 1 (4) (1970), 77–81.
- ‘De grote gedenkscarabeeën van Amenhotep III -2-’. De Ibis: [oude serie] 1 (5) (1970), 109–114.
- ‘De grote gedenkscarabeeën van Amenhotep III -3-’. De Ibis: [oude serie] 1 (6) (1970), 124–127.
- ‘More large commemorative scarabs of Amenophis III’. JEA 62 (1976), 74–80, pls. XII-XIII.
- ‘Once again some more commemorative scarabs of Amenophis III’. JEA 63 (1977), 83–87, pls. XIII-XIV.
- ‘Ahmes Merytamon and Ahhotep I, consort of Senakhtenre Tao I?’ GM 47 (1981), 15–19.
- ‘Additional remarks on Queen Ahhotep, consort of Senakhtenre Tao I?’ GM 49 (1981), 17–18.
- ‘Some observations on Amarna themes’. Oudheidkundige mededelingen uit het Rijksmuseum van Oudheden 62 (1981), 1–6.
- ‘A genealogical reconstruction of the kings and queens of the late 17th and early 18th dynasties’. GM 54 (1982), 31–45.
- ‘Kamosis’. GM 60 (1982), 7–8.
- ‘Queen Ahmes Merytamon’. GM 61 (1983), 13–16.
- ‘Ahmes Satamon’. GM 68 (1983), 37–41.
- ‘Ahmes Satamon once again’. JEA 72 (1986), 192–193.
- R.J. Demarée, ‘The Commemorative Scarabs of Amenophis III: An Update’, Jaarbericht Ex Oriente Lux 43 (2011), 25–34.

== Sources ==
- ‘Blankenberg-van Delden, Catharina (1906-1994)’. In: M.L. Bierbrier (ed.), Who Was Who in Egyptology (5th Revised Edition). London: Egypt Exploration Society, 2019; p. 55.
- O.E. Kaper, ‘De geschiedenis van de egyptologie aan Nederlandse universiteiten’. In: O.E. Kaper, J.G. Dercksen (red.), Waar de geschiedenis begon. Leiden: NINO, 2014; p. 57.
- M.J. Raven, ‘Chapter 5 - The Netherlands’. In: A. Bednarski, A. Dodson, Salima Ikram (eds.), A History of World Egyptology. Cambridge University Press, 2021; p. 148.
