= Commemorative scarabs of Amenhotep III =

Statuettes of scarabs of Ancient Egypt

Example commemorative scarab
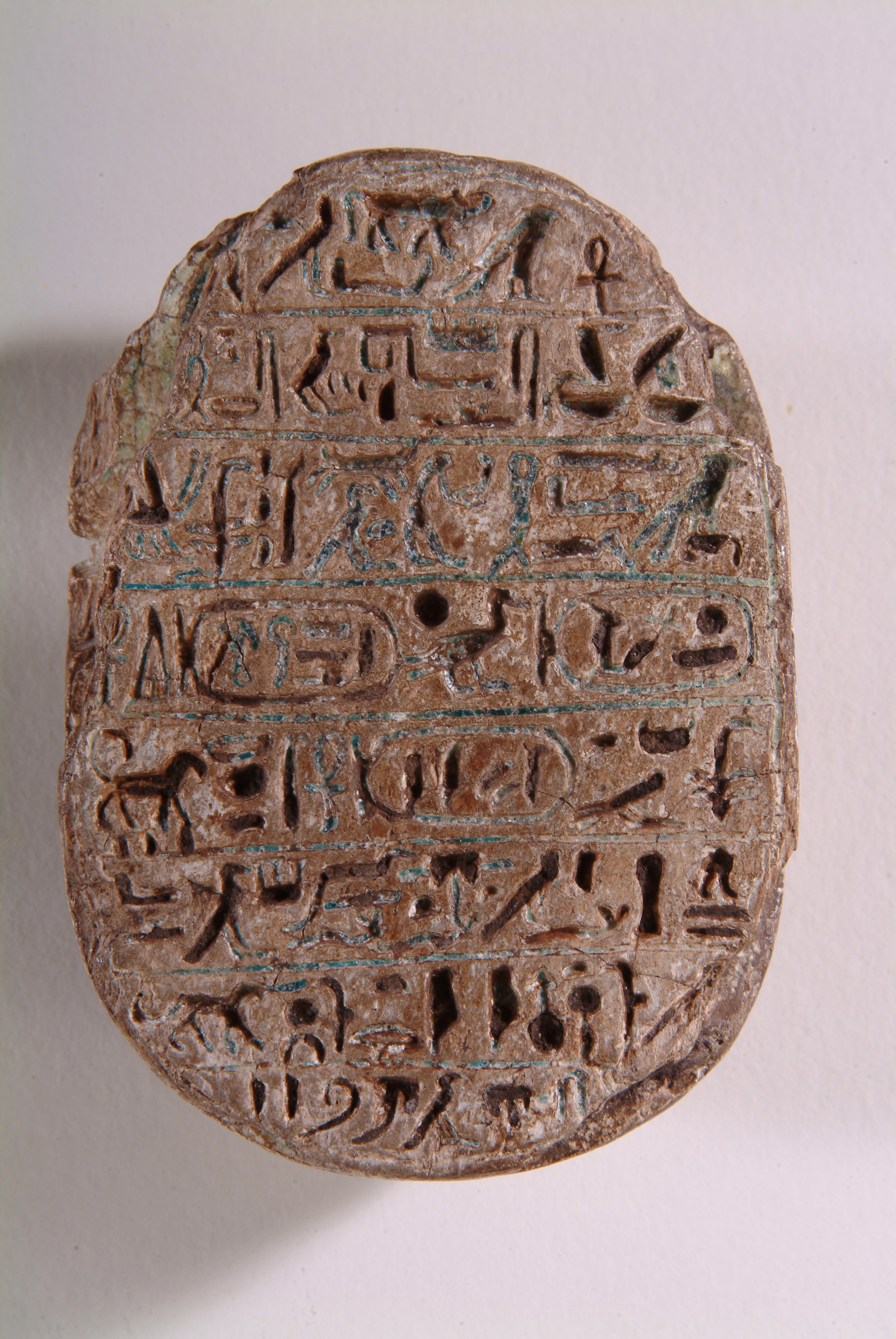
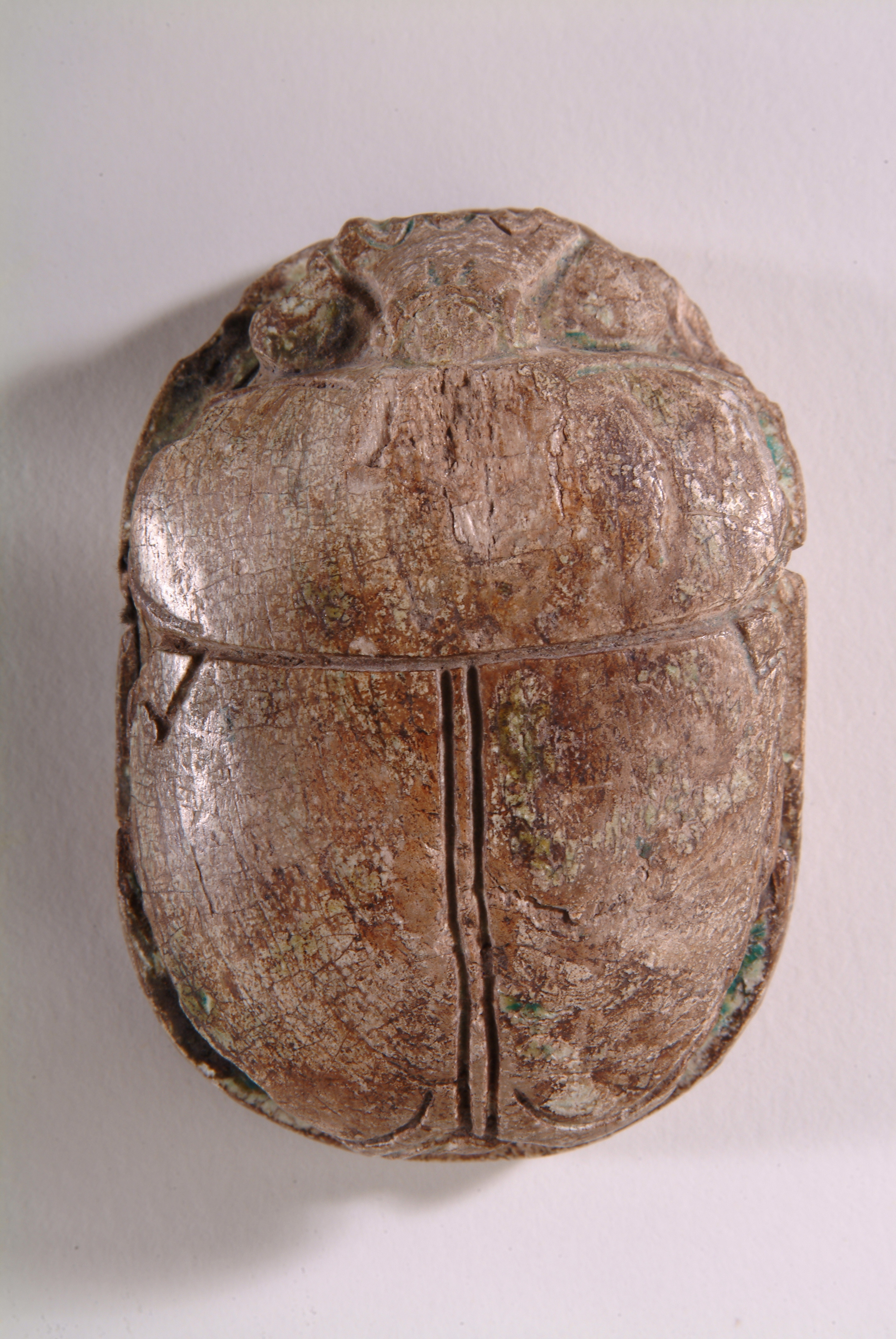

The commemorative scarabs of Amenhotep III were issued to commemorate the deeds of the pharaoh during his reign. Such scarabs were found in several archaeological sites of the Near East, from Syria to Sudan. Over two hundred of them are known to exist in museums and collections around the world.

Most of the scarabs are made of steatite painted blue or green. Their length varies between 4.7 and 11 cm, their width between 7 and 8.9 cm. Most of them are pierced for threading. On the basis of their inscriptions the scarabs can be divided into five groups (in parentheses the number of scarabs of the type found on several sites):

1. "Lion hunt scarabs" (123)
2. "Marriage scarabs" (56)
3. "Lake scarabs" (11)
4. "Bull hunt scarabs" (5)
5. "Gilukhepa scarabs" (5)

The scarabs are likely to have been made at the same time, in or after the 11th regnal year. The scarab beetle was a symbol of the sun god Khepri, and glazed materials were called tjehenet ('shining') in Egyptian, so the shining scarabs refer to the king, the dazzling Sun himself.

== Groups ==
=== Lion hunt ===
The lion hunt scarabs emphasise the pharaoh's strength and bravery by recording that Amenhotep killed over a hundred lions (102; 110 on some scarabs) during the first ten years of his reign. These have the shortest inscription (7 lines), their average length is 7,7 cm. The lion hunt scarabs vary the most in size; the smallest scarab is 4,7 cm long, the largest is more than twice its size with a length of 9,5 cm.

=== Marriage ===
The so-called marriage scarabs actually refer not to the marriage itself, and neither do they mention a marriage date. They record the name of Amenhotep's chief queen Tiye (following that of her husband), along with the names of her parents, as if to explicitly state her non-royal birth: the name of her father is Yuya, the name of her mother is Thuya; she is married to the great king whose southern border is at Karoy and whose northern is Naharin. Tiye's importance is shown by defining the boundaries of the empire in terms of her. The length of the inscription on these scarabs is 9-10 lines, the scarabs' average length is 8,5 cm.

=== Lake ===
The lake scarabs commemorate the construction of an artificial lake for Queen Tiye in the 11th regnal year. On these, the name and titles of the pharaoh are followed by those of Tiye, the names of her parents, then the description of the lake that was dug in Tiye's town Djaruha. The lake was 3700×700 cubits large, and the royal couple was rowed on the lake in the royal barge Aten-tjehen. The name of the boat means 'Shining Sun-disc', this is the first appearance of this name which later becomes an epithet of the king himself. The lake scarabs vary the most in their texts, but the differences don't affect the meaning of the text itself. The text is 11 lines long, the average length of these scarabs is 8,4 cm.

=== Bull hunt ===
The bull hunt scarabs record that in the 2nd regnal year Amenhotep, followed by his soldiers and officials, went to Shetep (possibly the area of Wadi el-Natrun) on his barge Khaemmaat ('Appears in Truth'), charged at wild bulls by his chariot and killed them. On the first day he slayed 56 bulls, four days later he killed 40 of them. The bulls had been previously surrounded with a ditch.

Hunt was not only a favourite pastime for the pharaohs, it also symbolized the ruler's strength and his victory over the forces of chaos, thus it equalled victory on a battlefield. These scarabs also list the titles of the king and mention Tiye.

The bull hunt scarabs have both the greatest length (9,9 cm) and the longest text. The only scarab which doesn't have its back carved in the shape of a beetle is among these scarabs. This one has two longitudinal holes for suspension.

=== Gilukhepa ===
The Gilukhepa scarabs commemorate the arrival of Princess Gilukhepa, daughter of Shuttarna II of Mitanni into the pharaoh's harem in the 10th regnal year. She had a retinue of 317 ladies-in-waiting. Tiye is also mentioned on the scarab. The length of the text is 10 lines, the average length of these scarabs is 7,2 cm.

== Inscription of a scarab ==
Inscription on one of the lion hunt scarabs:

anx G5 E1 D40 m xa i H6

Life for Horus, the Mighty Bull, appearing in truth

G16 s mn n Y1 h p w Z2 s g r H

The Two Ladies, who establishes law and pacifies

a N17 N17 G8 aA a xpS H A24 A t T14 Z3 rsw t

the Two Lands; the Golden Horus, strong of arm, who smites Asians, King of Upper and Lower Egypt,

< ra nb C10 > ra zA < i mn n Htp S38 R19 > di anx

Nebmaatre, Son of Re, Amenhotep, ruler of Thebes, may he live!

M23 N41 t < ti Z4 i i > anx ti i r Aa1 t E22 Z2

King's Wife Tiye, may she live! The number of lions

W25 n n Hm Z1 f m t F29 t f I10 z f

His majesty brought from his shooting,

m M4 t N5 Z1 nfr i i t D21 M4 t N5 V20 E22

from Year 1 to Year 10

H s Aa18 A F29 Z7 Z4

total of lions, 102.

== Gallery ==
Examples of scarabs
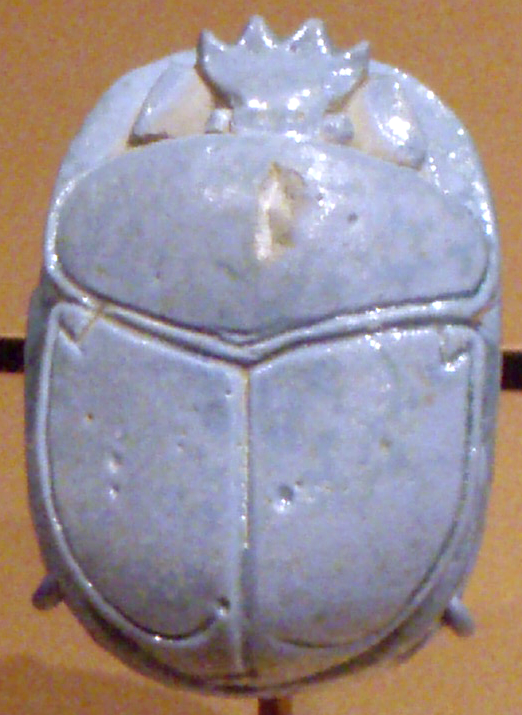
One of the so-called "marriage scarabs"

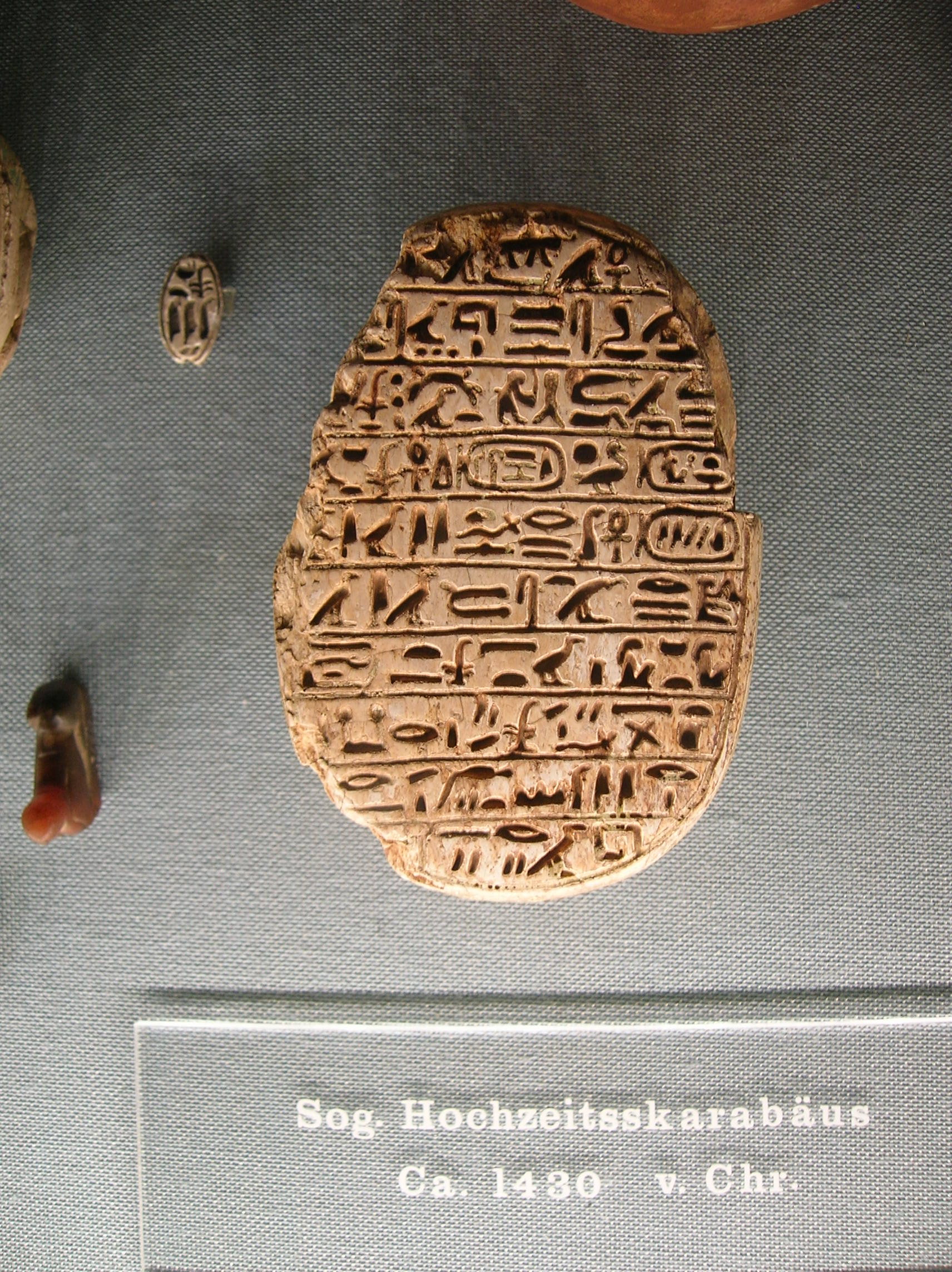
Marriage scarab (Vienna)

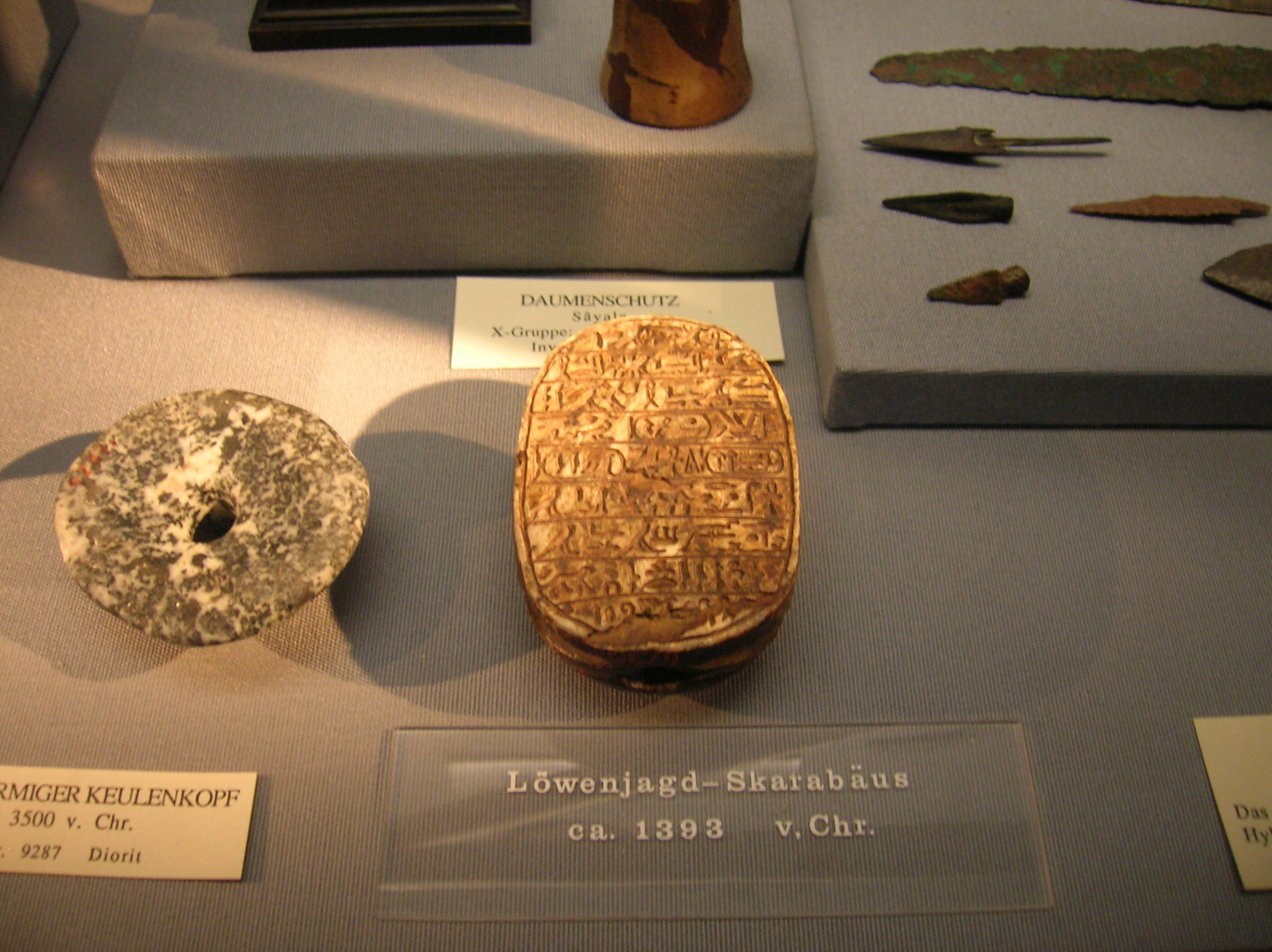
Lion hunt scarab (Vienna)
