= Khepri =

Ancient Egyptian god

- Khepri is often represented as a scarab holding aloft the morning sun, or a scarab-headed man. In one hand, the sun god holds a was scepter and in the other an ankh.
Name in hieroglyphs
xpr r i C2
- Major cult center: Heliopolis
- Symbol: scarab, blue lotus
- Parents: Nut (some accounts)
- Offspring: All gods (some accounts), Ma'at

Khepri (Egyptian: ḫprj, also transliterated Khepera, Kheper, Khepra, Chepri) is a scarab-faced god in ancient Egyptian religion who represents the rising or morning sun. By extension, he can also represent creation and the renewal of life.

== Etymology ==
The name "Khepri" appeared in the Pyramid texts and usually included the scarab hieroglyph as a determinative or ideogram as a potential means to make any allusions to the god clear. Khepri is also mentioned in the Amduat, as the god is intrinsically linked to cycle of the sun and Ra's nightly journey through the Duat, the Egyptian underworld.

Khepri (ḫprj) is derived from the Egyptian language verb ḫpr, meaning to "develop" or "create". Khepri (ḫprj) can also be spelled "Kheper", which is the Egyptian term used to denote the sun god, the scarab beetle, and the verbs "to come into existence" or "to be born".

== Symbolism ==
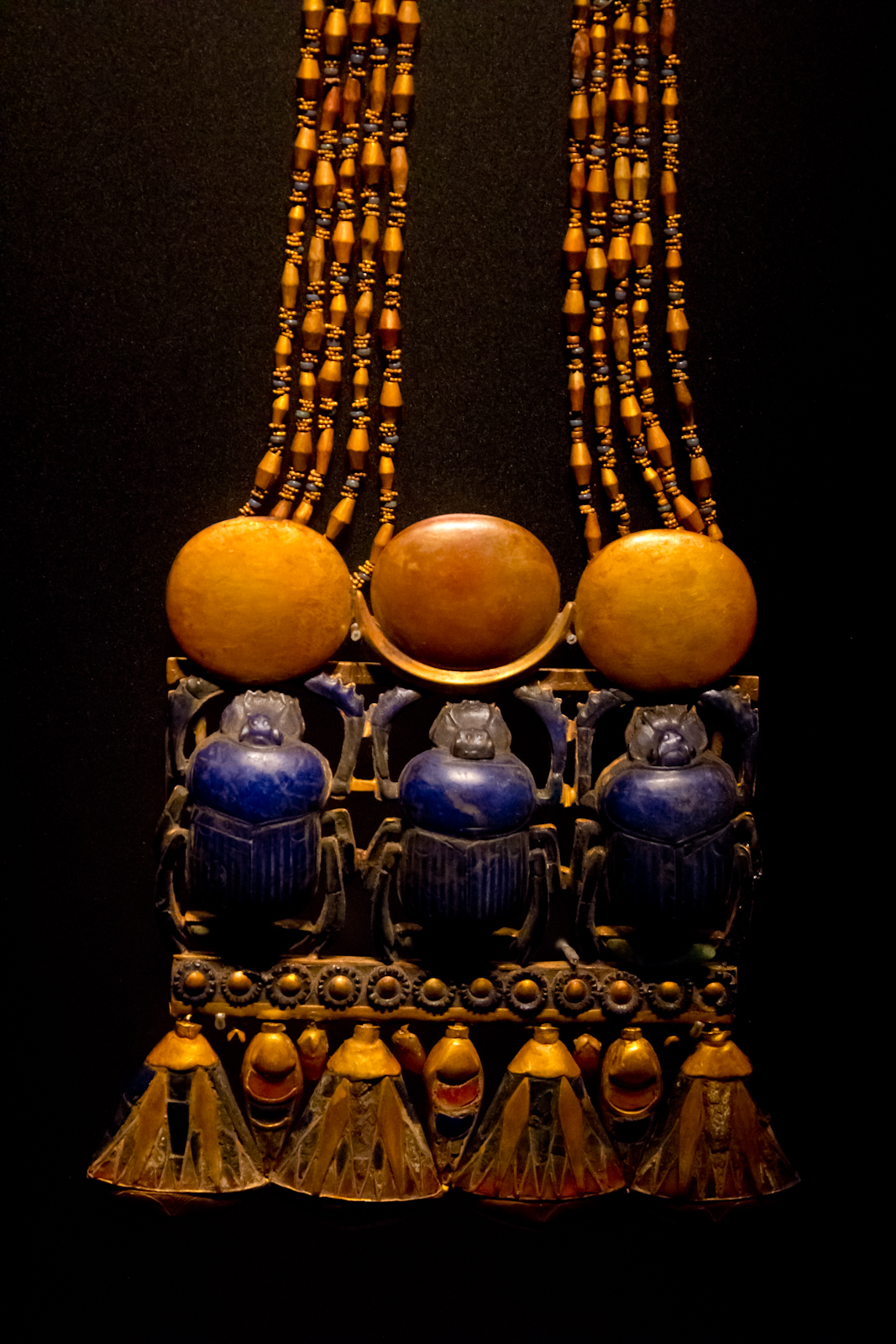
A pectoral with three scarab beetles attached to a necklace. The jewelry was discovered in the tomb of Tutankhamun. The scarabs, which represent Khepri, are each pushing a sun.

The god was connected to and often depicted as a scarab beetle (ḫprr in Egyptian). Scarab beetles lay their eggs within dung balls, and as a result, young beetles emerge from the balls fully formed, having eaten their way out of the mounds. This caused ancient Egyptians to believe that these insects were created from nothingness. They also believed that each day the sun was reborn or created from nothing, thus explaining the connection made between the Sun and the scarab.

In hour twelve of the Amduat, a newly reborn Khepri helms the solar barque that pushes the sun, moving the morning sun across the early day sky. This mirrors the manner in which a scarab beetle pushes large balls of dung along the ground, highlighting the relationship made between Khepri and the insects.

Scarab-shaped accessories were common in ancient Egypt, as rings or amulets meant to be attached to necklaces were often fashioned in the shape of these insects. Such objects that depicted scarabs were often handed out to the Egyptian people during public festivals, with the amulets worn in order to bring good fortune, to express devotion to the king or the gods, or to act as protective charms. These scarab idols, whether they were made of faience, an amalgamated material composed of common minerals like quartz and alkaline salts that was cheap to produce, or turquoise, a rare and highly sought after stone, were often colored blue, which signifies that the color might have been significant in its relation to the gods.

The color had a variety of meanings to the ancient Egyptians. Blue could have represented the sky or the heavens, the primordial flood, which also suggests that the color symbolized a cycle of life, death, and rebirth. Fertility was another characteristic potentially represented by the color blue, as the Nile river was often highlighted by the color. While it is impossible to assume that the blue scarabs depicted in Egyptian art were meant to represent both Khepri and the traits of the color, the correlation between the divine symbolism of the beetle and meaning of the color blue is unlikely to be a mere coincidence.

== Religion ==
Khepri was a solar deity and thus connected to the rising sun and the mythical creation of the world. The god and the scarab beetle represented creation and rebirth. There was no cult devoted to Khepri, as he was seen as a manifestation of the more prominent solar deity Ra. The scarab god was however included in the creationist theory of Heliopolis and later Thebes. Often, Khepri and another solar deity, Atum, were seen as aspects of Ra: Khepri represented the morning sun, Ra was the midday sun, and Atum represented the evening sun. As a deity, Khepri's four main functions were creator, protector, sun-god, and the god of resurrection. The central belief surrounding Khepri was the god's ability to renew life, in the same way he restored the sun's existence every morning. Mummified scarab beetles and scarab amulets have been found in pre-dynastic graves, suggesting that Khepri was revered early on in the history of Ancient Egypt.

== Appearances in funerary texts ==
Khepri's most important role in ancient Egyptian religion is the integral part he plays in the life and death cycle of the sun. There are three major funerary texts in which Khepri makes an appearance; the Amduat, the Book of Caverns, and the Book of Gates.

Each text is similar in that the lifeless corpse of Khepri is conjoined with the soul of Ra at some point during the god's journey through the underworld. In fact, the Book of Gates and the Amduat have been noted to be very similar, with the only significant difference between the two funerary texts being that the Amduat focuses more on the journey Ra takes through the Underworld, whereas the Book of Gates focuses more on the journey a human soul takes to follow the solar god. Khepri's corpse is reached in both texts in the sixth hour of the night, and he leads the solar barque out of the Underworld in both stories as well.

The Book of Caverns is unique among these funerary texts in that it is not divided into hours as the other two are, rather it is broken up into tableaus. Regardless of this difference, Khepri's corpse is still depicted within the Underworld, appearing in the third tableau instead of the sixth hour.

The Third Tableau of the Book of Caverns, in which Khepri's corpse is shown in the bottom middle to be surrounded by a massive serpent.

== Khepri's role in the Amduat ==
The Amduat is the nightly journey Ra, and by proxy the sun, takes through the underworld, as he is exhausted and aged from his day's work of moving the solar barque across the sky. Through this voyage across the underworld, both the Ra and the sun are reborn, as the god takes the form of Khepri, who leads the sun across the sky during the morning.

There are two hours of the Amduat that Khepri is involved. Hour six sees the solar barque of Ra reach the primordial waters of Nun, in which rests the corpse of Khepri surrounded by an enormous multi-headed snake. It is unclear how Khepri died and how a serpent with five heads came to guard his corpse. Nevertheless, the ba, or soul, of Ra combines itself with Khepri's body, thus resurrecting the solar god.

Khepri is not explicitly mentioned again within the Amduat until hour twelve, the last hour as the sun begins its ascent back into the sky. In this hour, Khepri is at the helm of the solar barque, leading the vessel out of the underworld and, with the help of Shu, the god of air and winds, back into the sky, so that sun may once again bathe the world in its light. Khepri plays a vital role in this journey, as he is the one that guides the sun through the last leg of its voyage through the underworld and ushers in the dawn of a new day as the god of the morning sun.

The 12th Hour of the Amduat is depicted here, with Khepri in his scarab form seen at the helm of the solar barque.

== Gallery ==
Khepri was depicted as either a scarab holding aloft the sun disk or as a human male with a scarab for a head. The scarab amulets that the Egyptians used as jewelry and as seals allude to Khepri and the newborn sun. The beetle carvings became so common that excavators have found them throughout the Mediterranean.

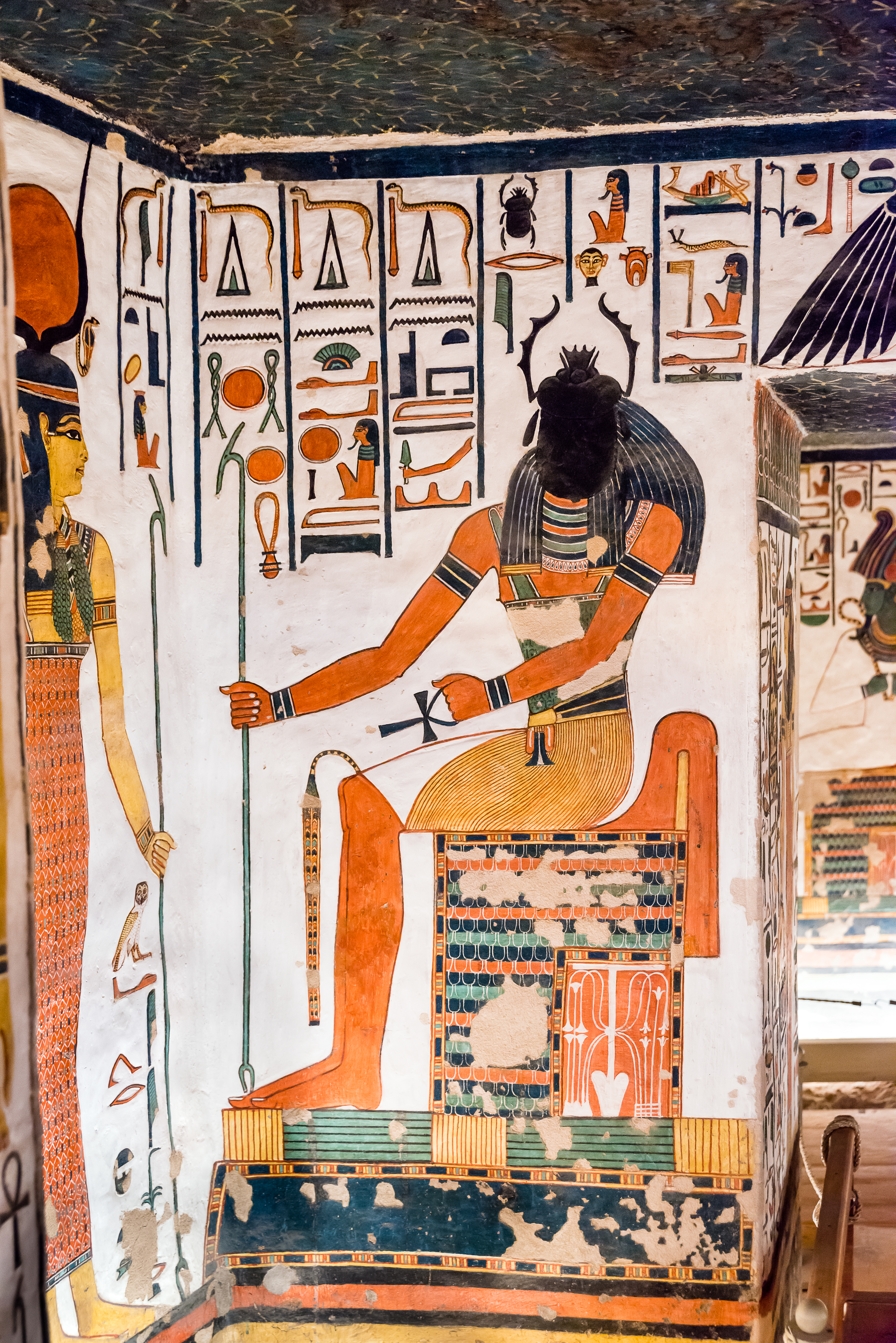
Painting of Khepri in QV66, the entrance to the tomb of Nefertari.

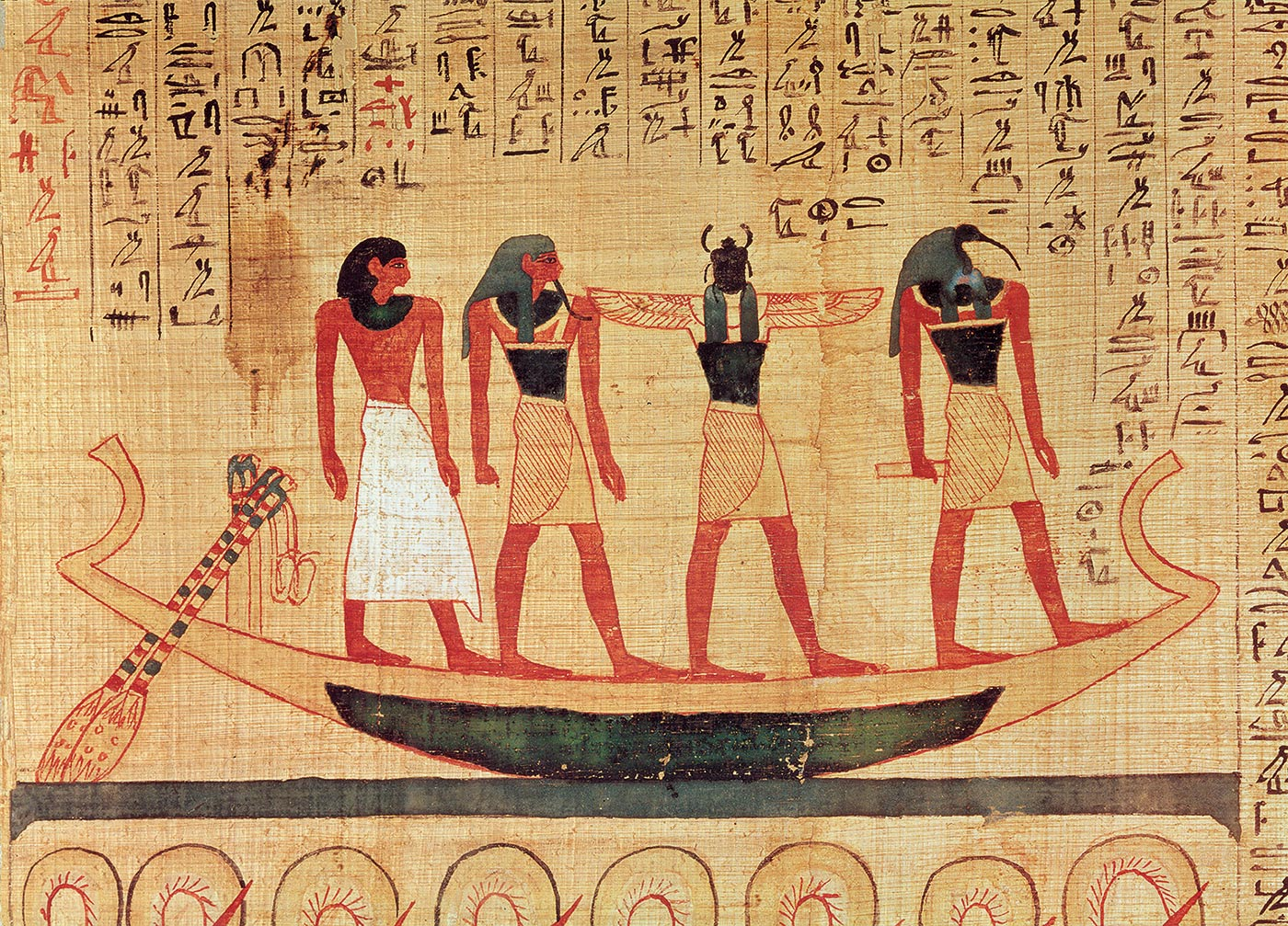
A depiction of Khepri with the upper body of a winged scarab and the lower body of a male human.

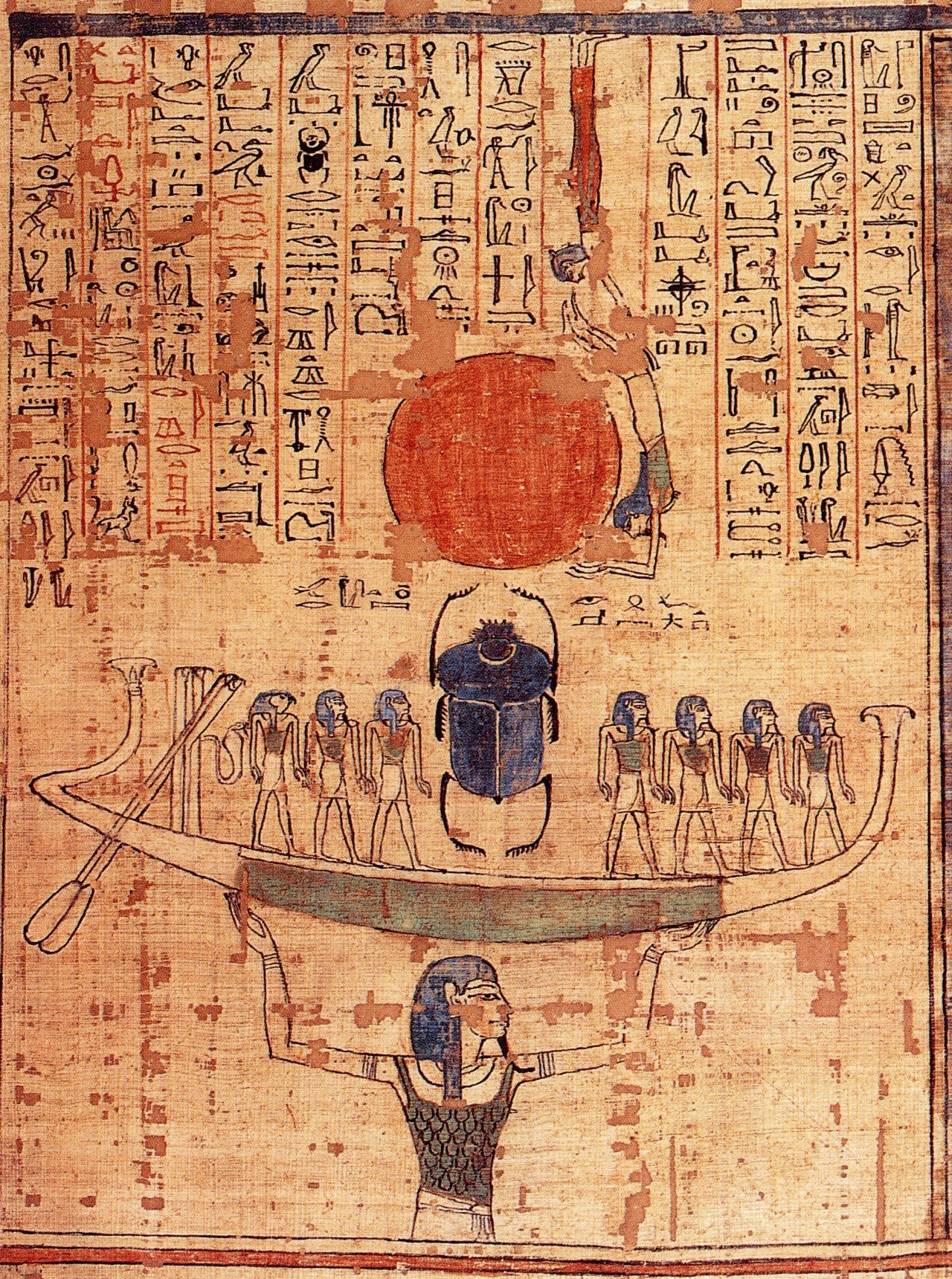
Nun, god of the waters of chaos, lifts the barque of the sun god Ra, who is represented by both the scarab and the sun disk, into the sky at the beginning of time.

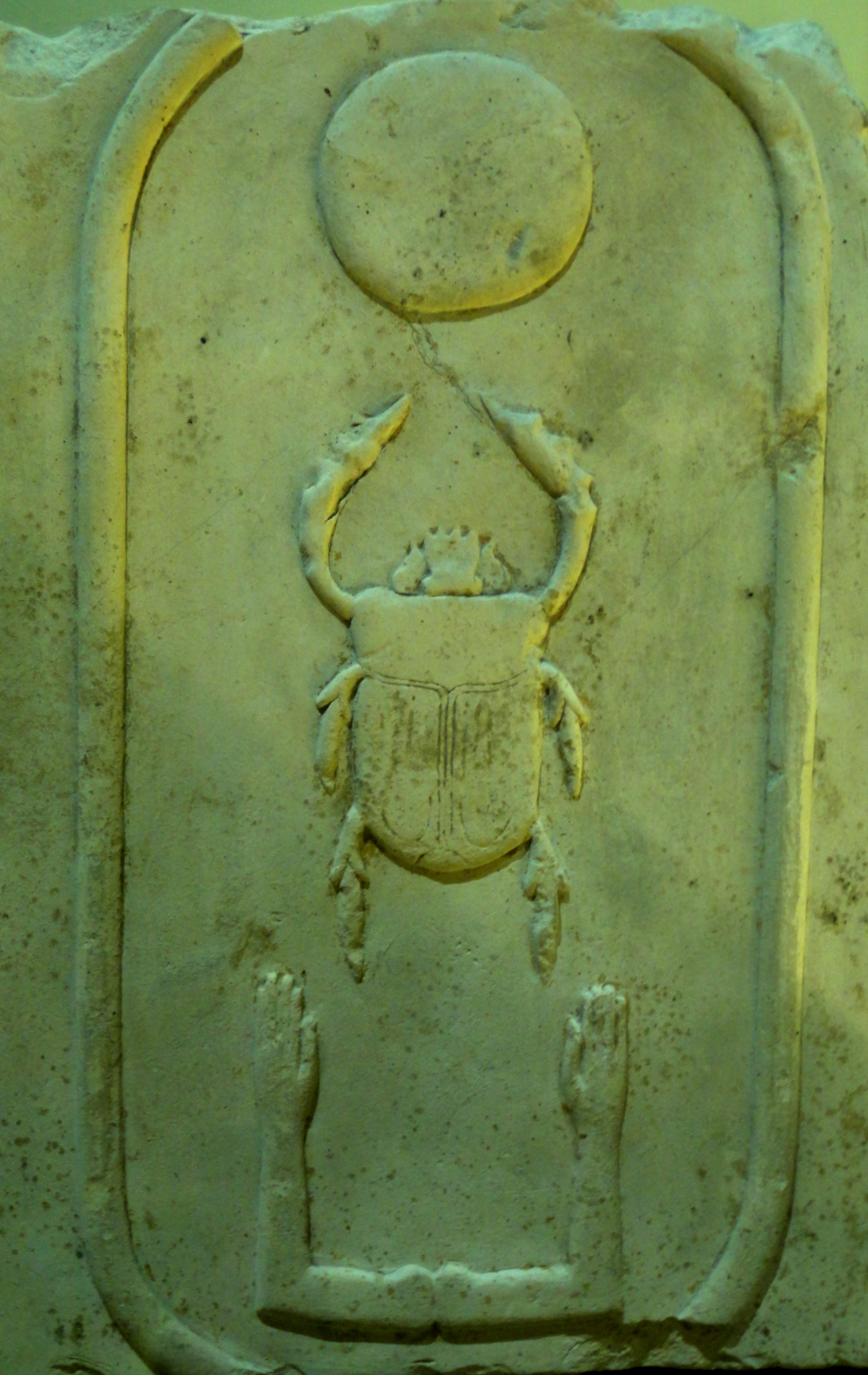
Relief of Khepri holding the sun.

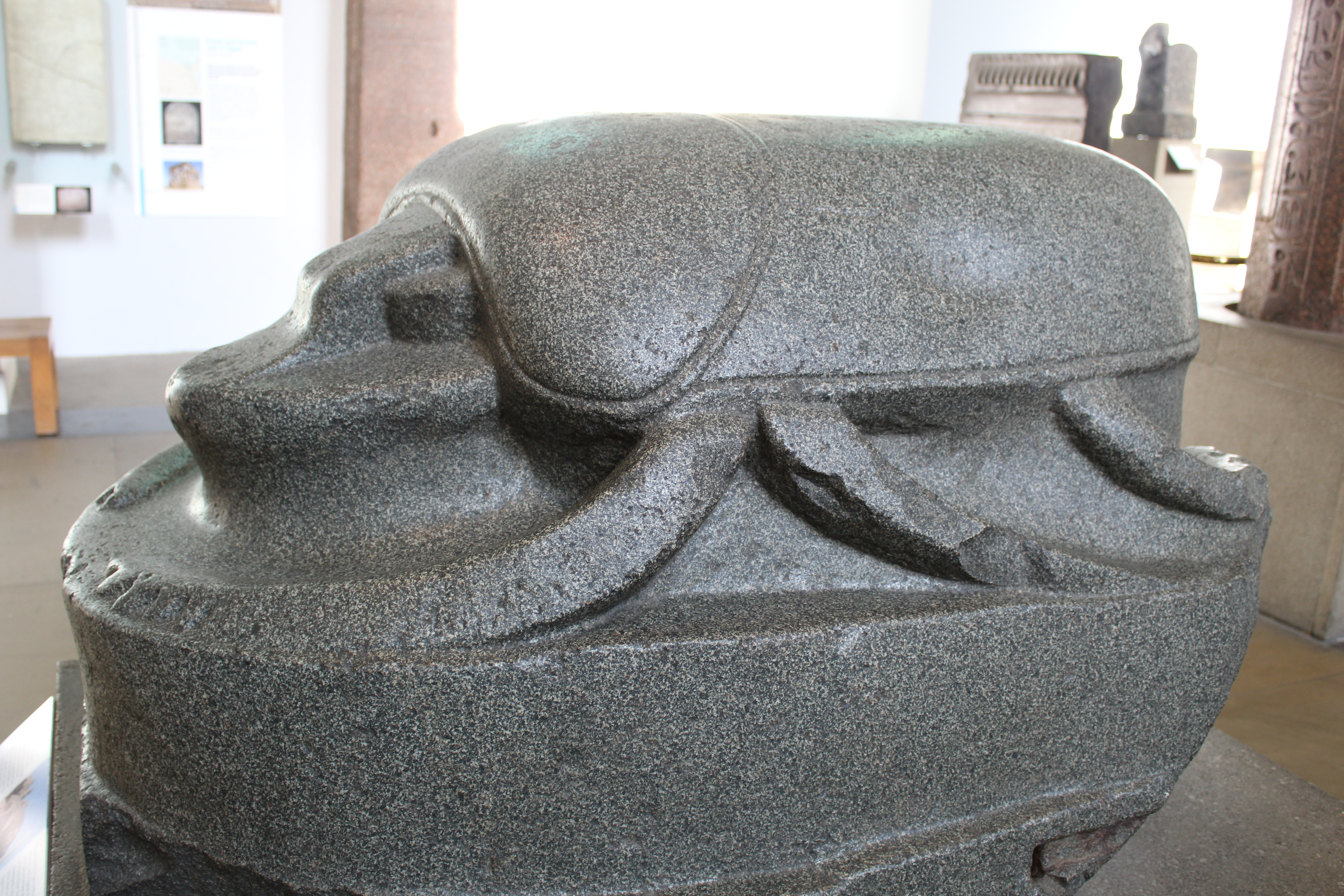
Statue of Khepri.

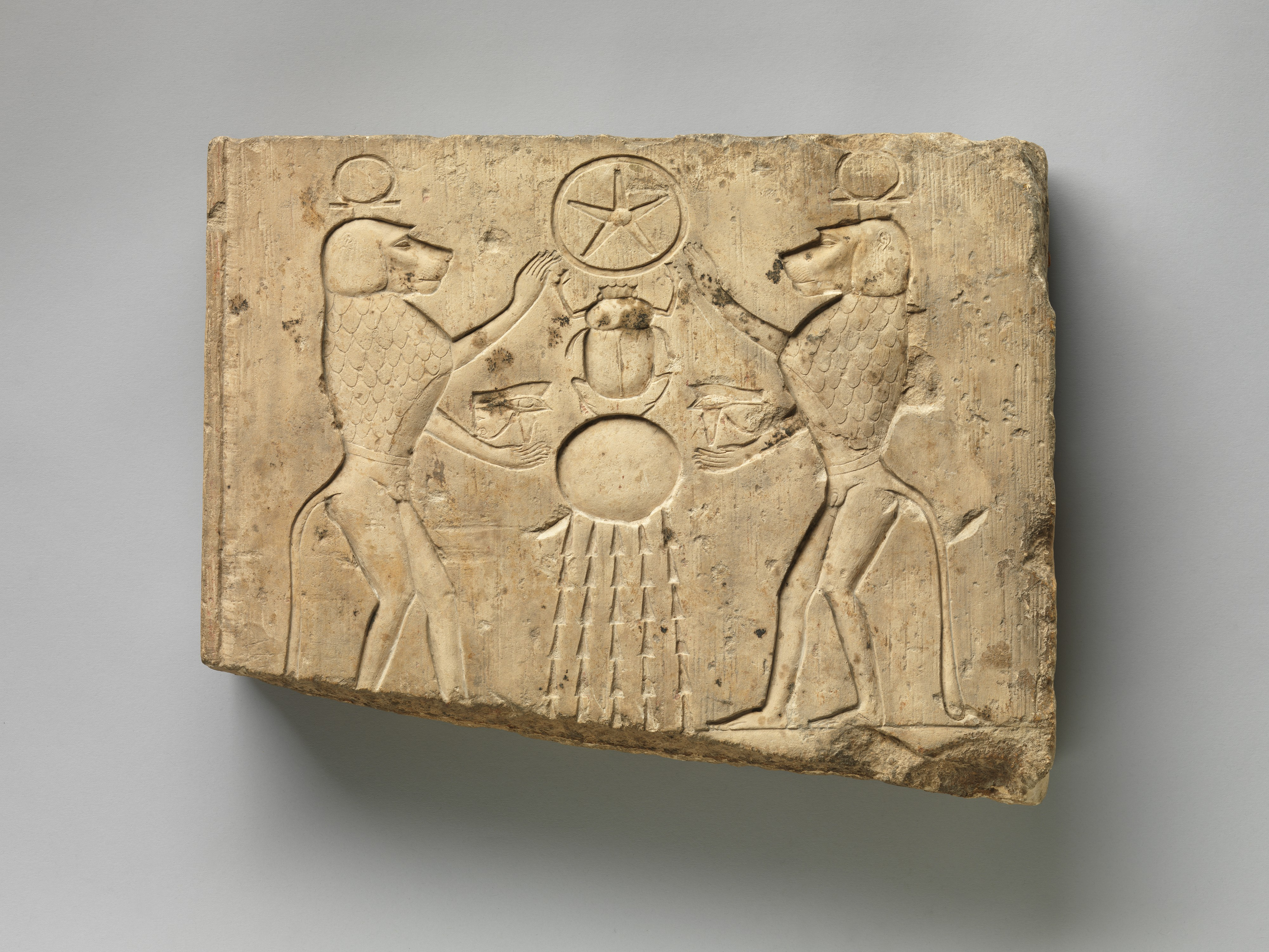
On this relief panel, Khepri is depicted solely as a scarab beetle. Above his head the sun god holds the Duat, a symbol for the afterlife. The scarab stands on a sun disk with sun rays extending downwards.

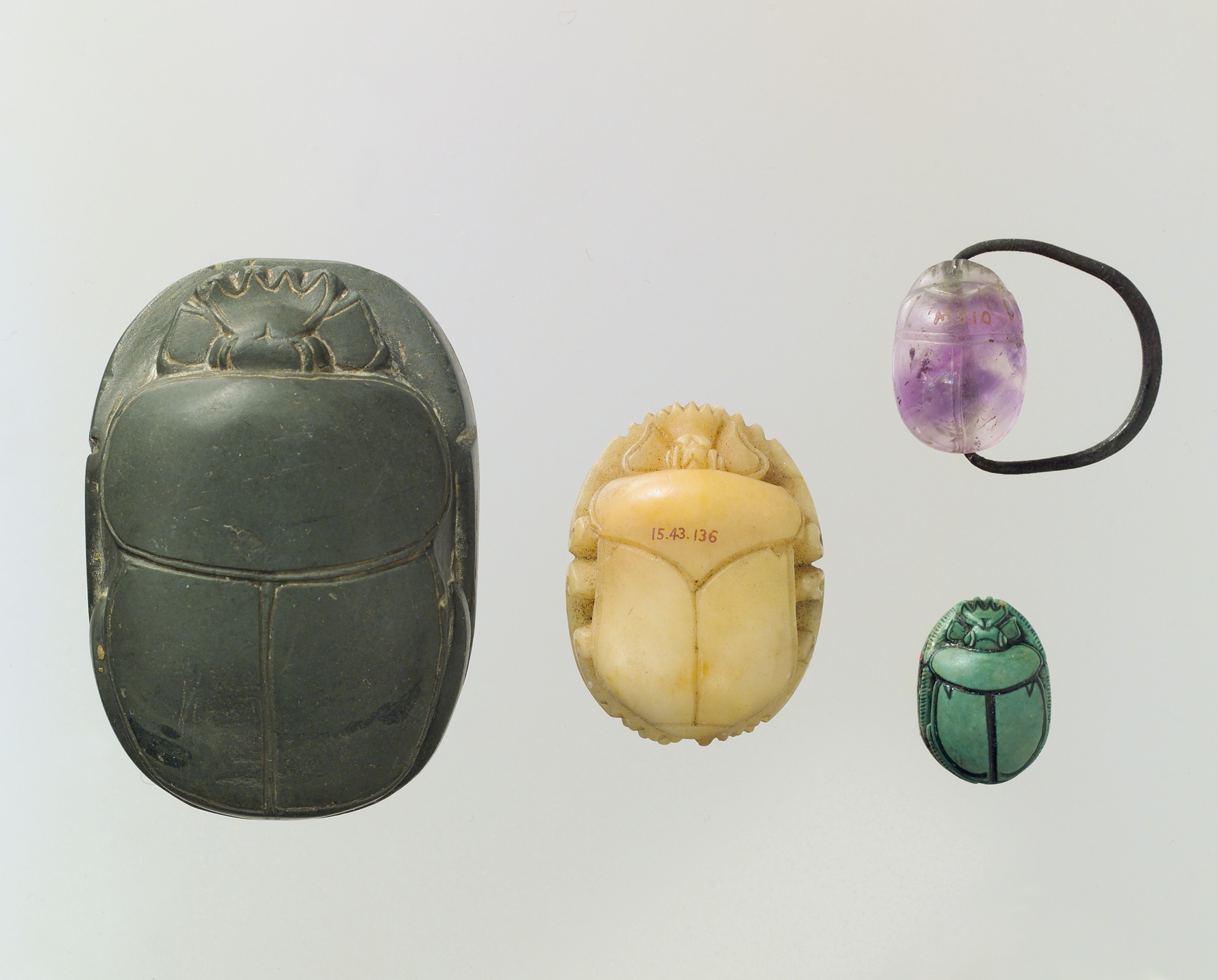
Scarab beetles were one of the most common material objects made by the ancient Egyptians. These scarabs, from the Middle Kingdom, were likely used as jewelry, specifically amulets. The scarab beetle is symbolic of Khepri, the Egyptian sun deity who represents creation and rebirth.

== See also ==
- Solar myths
