= Astronomical ceiling of Senenmut's Tomb =

Celestial diagram in ancient Egyptian tomb

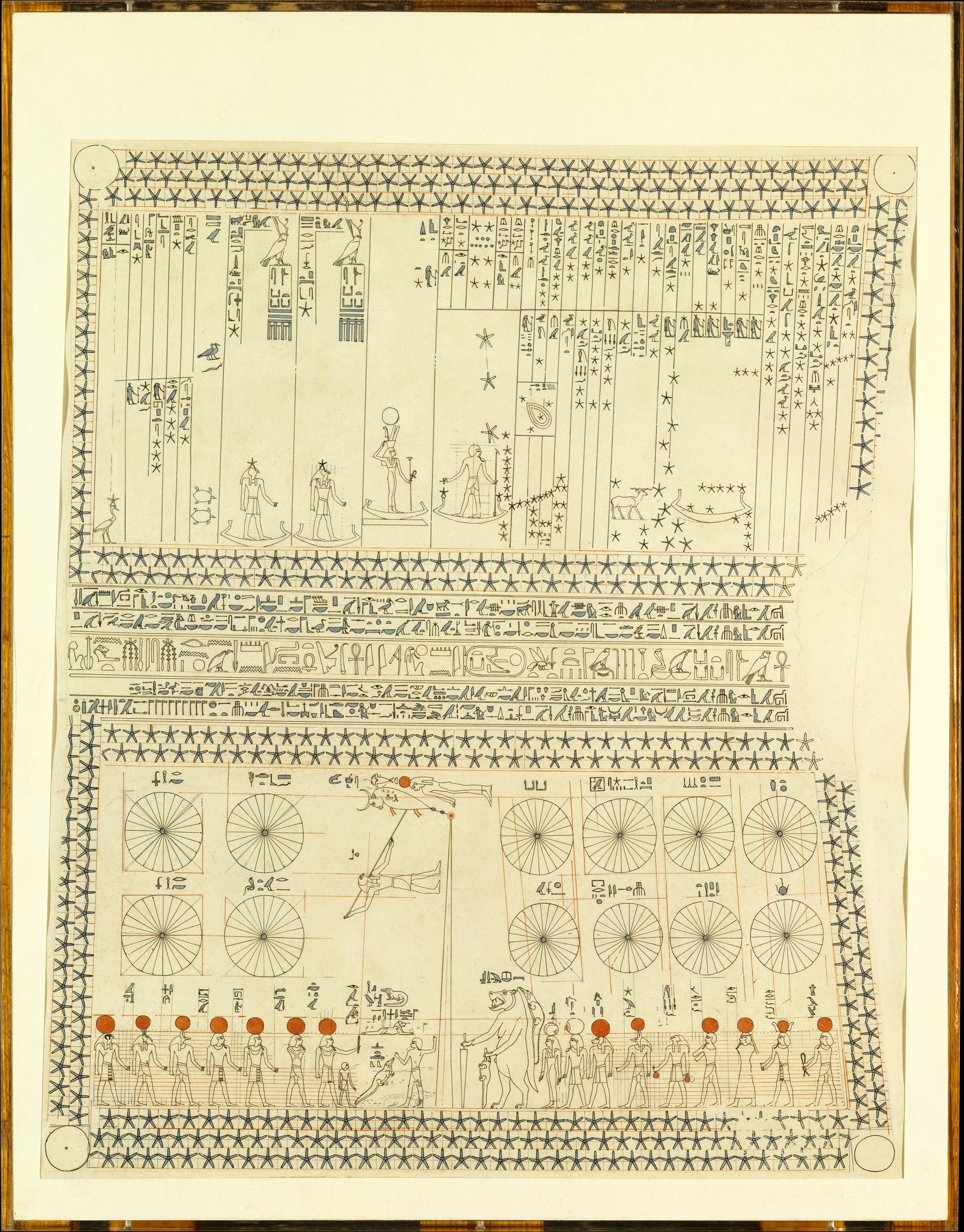
Top and bottom portions

Astronomical ceiling decoration in its earliest form can be traced to the tomb of Senenmut (Theban tomb no. 353), located at the site of Deir el-Bahri, discovered in Thebes, Upper Egypt. The tomb and the ceiling decorations date back to the XVIII Dynasty of ancient Egypt (circa 1479–1458 BCE). It is closed to the public.

== Discovery ==
The tomb of Senemut was discovered during the 1925–1927 excavations directed by Herbert Winlock for the Egyptian Expedition of the Metropolitan Museum of Art.

The unfinished tomb is entered via a steep descending stairway starting in a quarry. This is 90m long and gives access to three successive chambers under the Mortuary Temple of Hatshepsut. Whether this was done to deliberately place his tomb in the precincts of Hatshepsut's temple or to reach better quality sandstone is not known. The unearthing of the 10x12 ft. chamber known as Chamber A yielded the two panels of what is now referred to as the Egyptian Celestial Diagram.

The ceiling and wall carvings are particularly well preserved as due to the Tarawan chalk into which they were carved. They were painted in the Amduat style that was common at the time.

== Celestial Diagram ==
The Celestial Diagram consisted of a northern and a southern panel which depicted circumpolar constellations in the form of discs; each divided into 24 sections suggesting a 24-hour time period, lunar cycles, and sacred deities of Egypt. Of the constellations present on the diagram, the only certainly identifiable was Meskhetyu with the Big Dipper because of the difficulty that arises when an attempt is made to match modern day constellations with the depictions made thousands of years ago by the ancient Egyptians.

- Some of the main figures and stars seen in the diagram are Sirius, Orion, Ursa Major, Draco (may be depicted as hippopotamus with crocodile on its back),
- The four circles on the top right refer to the four months of Akhet (inundation) between July and October
- The two circles at the top left and the two below them refer to the season of Peret (planting season) between November and February
- The four circles on the right refer to the season of Shomu (harvesting season) between March and June

The map on the southern panel could well reflect a specific conjunction of planets in 1534 BCE around the longitude of Sirius. The four planets Jupiter, Saturn, Mercury and Venus are relatively easily recognizable. The planet Mars is not included in the actual grouping and at first sight seems to be missing in the map. However, one explanation is that Mars is represented in the Senenmut map as an empty boat in the west. This may refer to the fact that Mars was retrograde and was not with the other planets (indeed, being in the west in the 1534 BCE conjunction). The reason for the boat being empty is perhaps in this backward movement (a well known phenomenon to the Egyptians) the position of Mars was not considered to be ”concrete”.

An alternative explanation for the missing Mars is proposed by Belmonte,

″...the astronomical ceiling of the tomb of Senenmut is a gigantic copy of a papyrus draft of a celestial diagram that would have existed and used to be represented in clepsydrae (water clocks, as that of Karnak). Because of the lack of space, when moving the design from a conical to a flat surface, part of the decoration was lost.″

== Significance ==
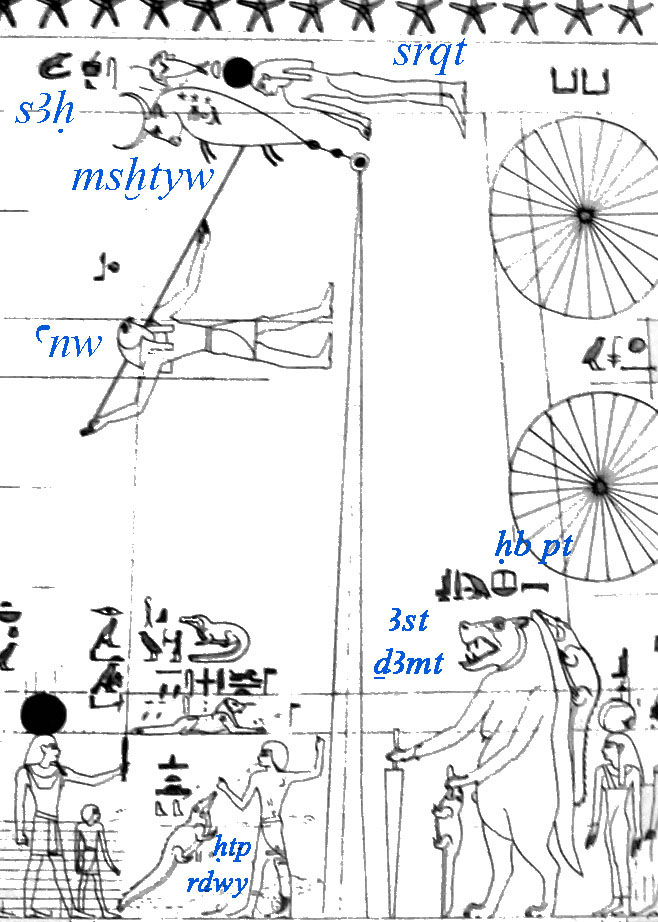
Constellations on the astronomical ceiling of Senemut Tomb

Although the tomb had been unfinished and had sustained damage throughout the centuries, the ceiling yielded new information about astronomy, chronology, mythology, and religion in Egypt because of the incorporation of all these elements as a means of connecting the divine to the mortal world.

Egyptian astronomy consisted of the identification of the heavenly bodies in the sky and their connection with the deities that were believed to play a role in religious mythology and practice.

Astronomical ceilings bore significant symbolism for the Egyptians as they combined divine religion with more earthly aspects of daily life such as agriculture and labor. The detailed depiction of astronomy and deities illustrates the Egyptians desire to understand the heavens and the attempt to apply that understanding to the gods that they believed influenced all aspects of life.

The assimilation of these elements ensured that the Egyptian calendar would differ from the ancient calendars of the Sumerians and the Babylonians. Otto Neugebauer suggests that the complexity of Egyptian calendars:

represents the peaceful coexistence of different methods of defining time moments and time intervals in different ways on different occasions.

The use of astronomical calendars was not limited to ceiling tombs as they appeared on coffin boards, water boards, temples, and various other surfaces and objects.

== See also ==
- Dendera zodiac
