= Ostracon of Senenmut =

Ancient Egyptian limestone ostracon

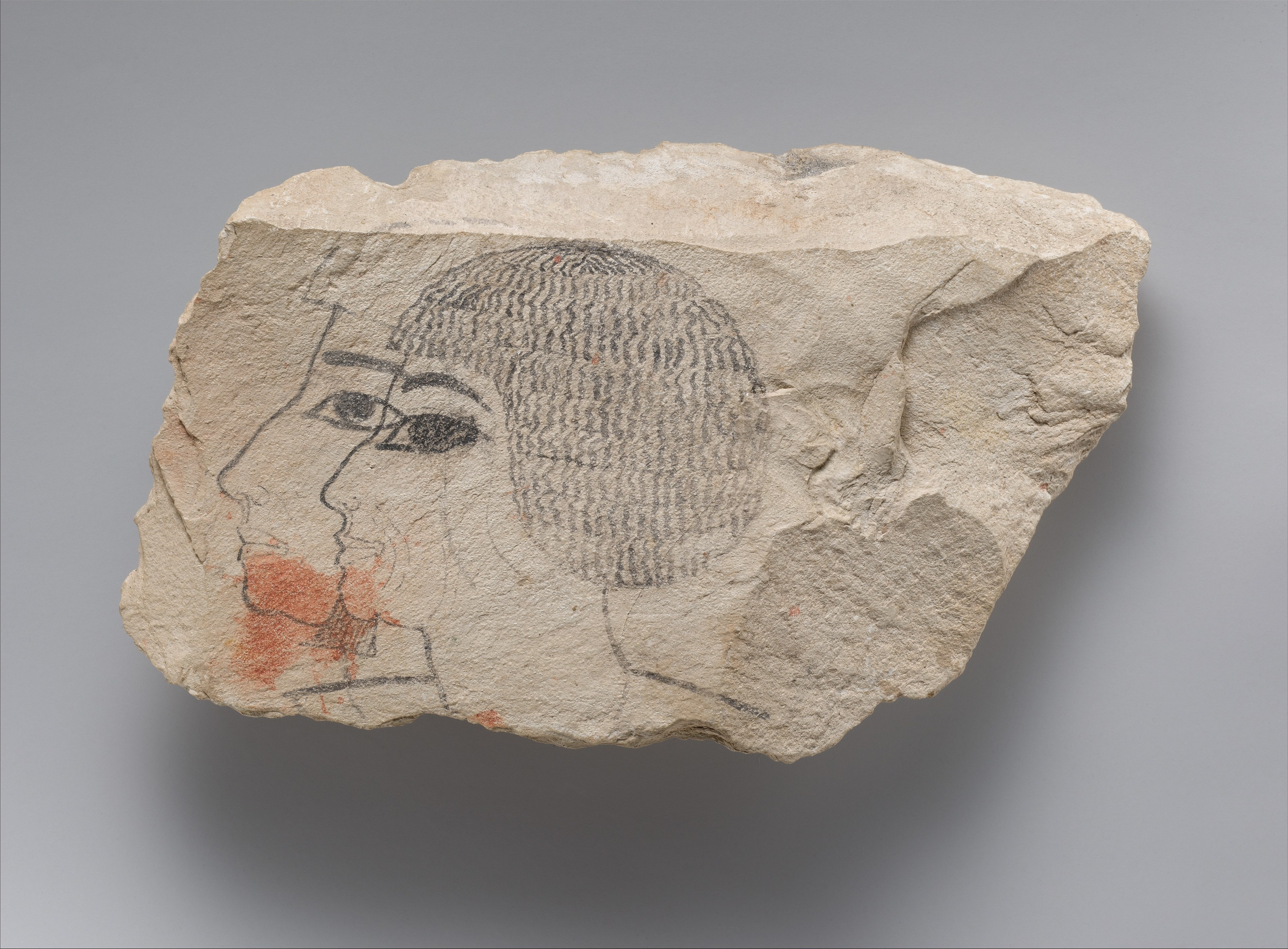
- Limestone ostracon of Senenmut
- Material: Limestone
- Height: 7.62 cm
- Width: 17.78 cm
- Created: c. 1469 BC
- Discovered: Egypt
- Present location: New York City, New York, United States

The Ostracon of Senenmut or Senemut is an ancient Egyptian limestone ostracon which dates from the reign of Hatshepsut (1479 BC – 1458 BC), in the 18th Dynasty.

== Design ==
The ostracon portrays Senenmut, a courtier of Hatshepsut.

It is a figured-ostracon, of portrait type with heads only. The ceramic is made of white limestone, with dimensions of approximately 3 in (0.8 dm) by 7 in (1.8 dm).

The Ostracon of Senenmut is currently part of the collection at the Metropolitan Museum of Art.

Traditionally, ostraca in Egypt were used for artist's sketchings, cartoons-caricatures, letter documents, school–practice writing, and graffiti.

== Ostraca depicting Senenmut ==
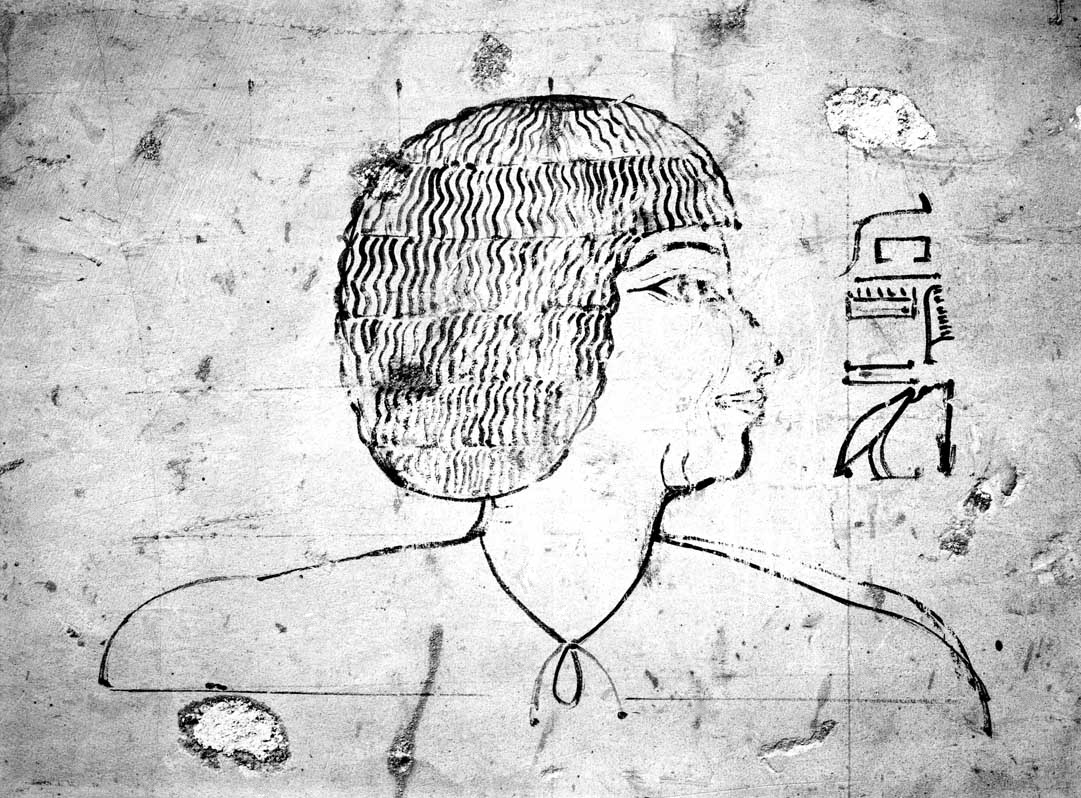
Ostracon found from the dump below Senenmut's tomb chapel (SAE 71), mentioning Senenmut by name and depicting his profile. Now in the Metropolitan Museum.

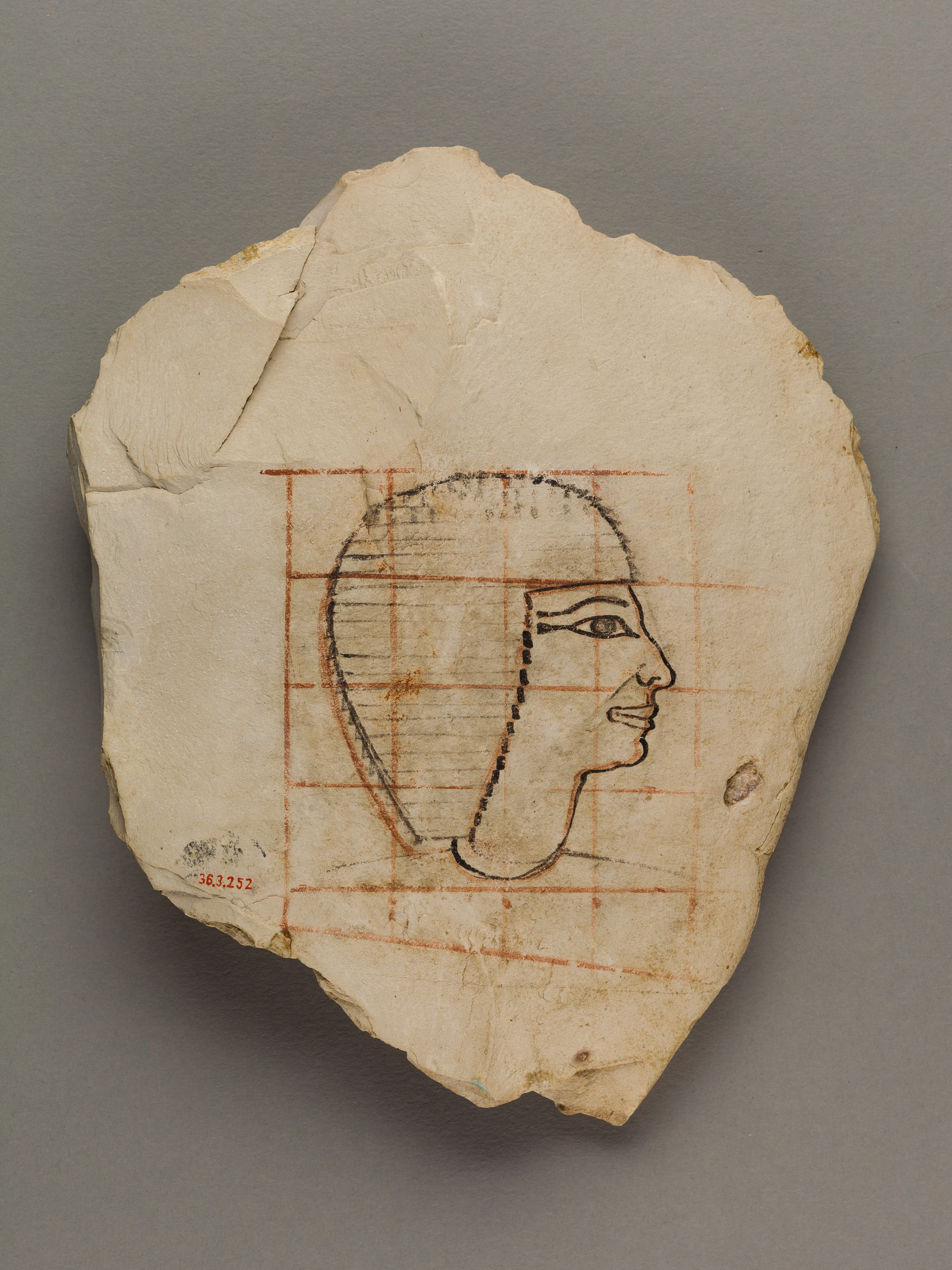
Ostracon found from the dump below Senenmut's tomb chapel (SAE 71) thought to depict his profile. Now in the Metropolitan Museum.

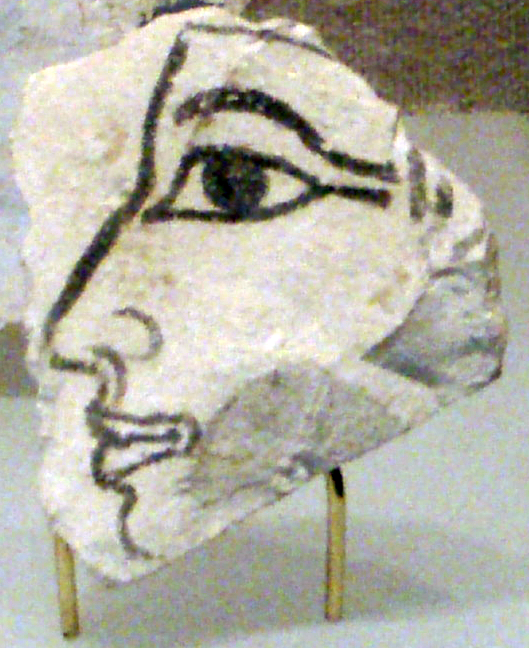
Ostracon found from the dump below Senenmut's tomb chapel (SAE 71) thought to depict his profile. Now in the Metropolitan Museum.

== See also ==
- Djehuty, the god Thoth
