= Ramose and Hatnofer =

Ancient Egyptian couple, parents of Senenmut

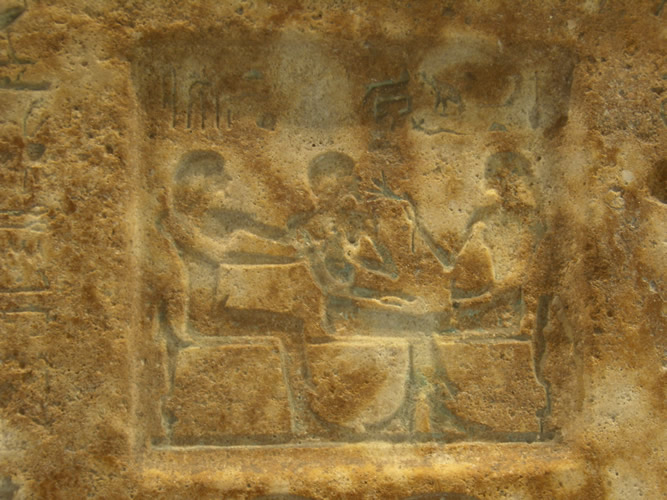
Ramose (left), Senenmut (middle) and Hatnofer on the false door of their son Senenmut's tomb

Ramose and Hatnofer (also spelled, Hatnefer, Hatnefert) were the parents of Senenmut, one of the most important state officials under the reign of the Egyptian queen Hatshepsut in the Eighteenth Dynasty of Egypt. Ramose was his father and Hatnofer was his mother. The commoner origins of Ramose and the rise of his son Senenmut were long considered to be prime examples of high social mobility in New Kingdom Egypt. For instance, little is known of Ramose's origins, but he seems to have been a man of modest means—anything from a tenant peasant or farmer, to an artisan or even a small landowner. When Ramose died he was a man aged 50–60 (based on the dental evidence). Hatnofer died as an elderly lady, with grey or even white hair. They are believed to have been born at Armant, a town only ten miles (16 km) south of Thebes within Upper Egypt, presumably during the reign of Ahmose I, the founder of Egypt's illustrious eighteenth dynasty. Ramose is known from a few contemporary sources. He and his wife appear on the false door of Senenmut's TT71 tomb chapel and likely, he appears in the chapel.

== Tomb of Hatnofer and Ramose ==
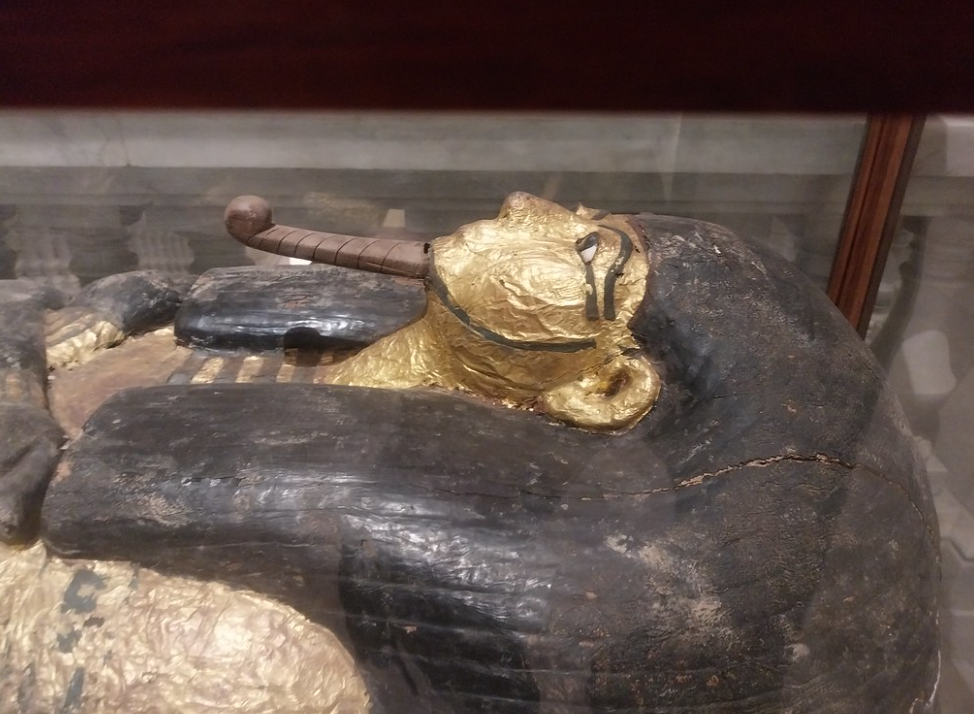
Coffin lid of Hatnefer from her tomb

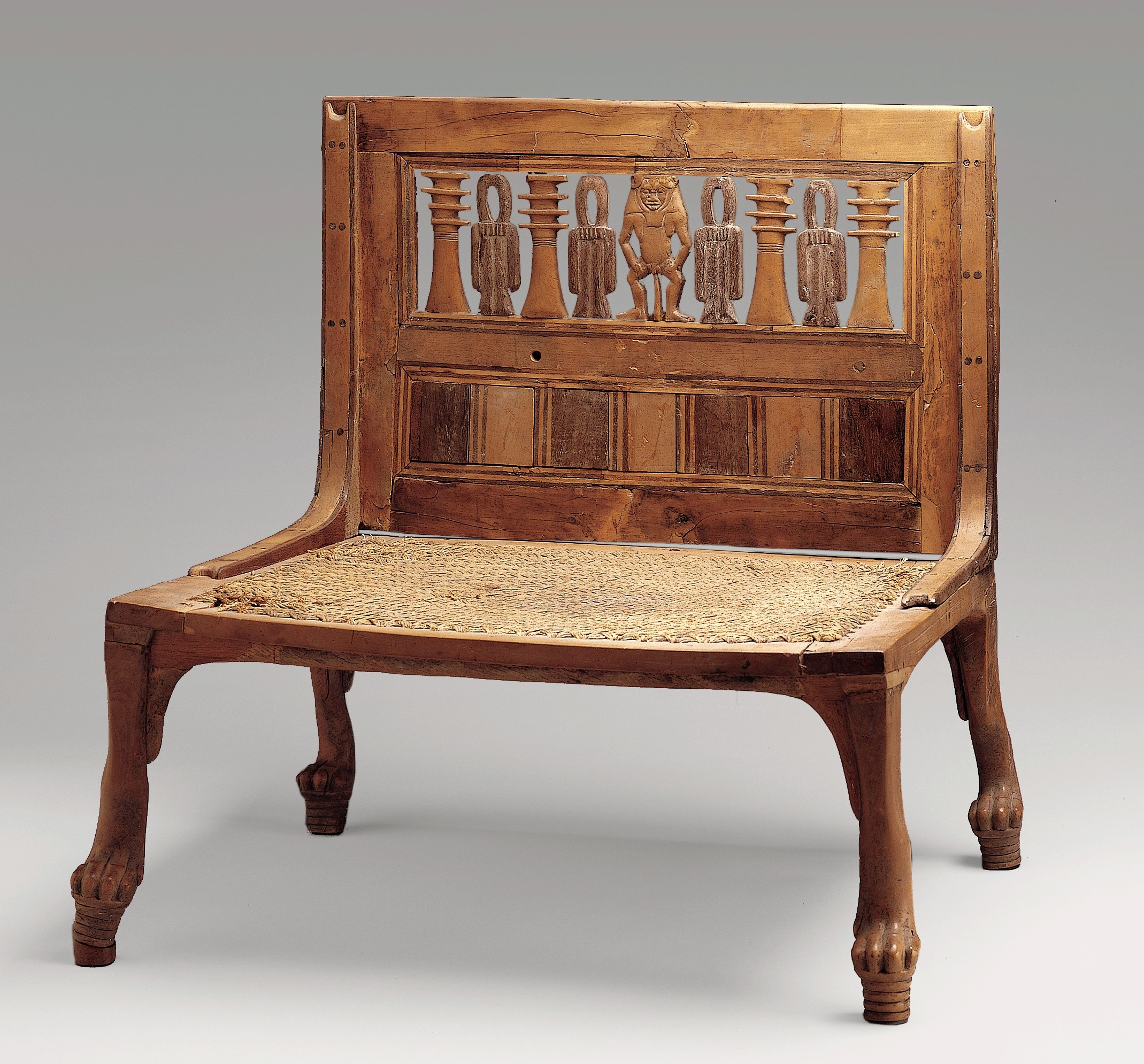
Chair of Hatnefer from her tomb

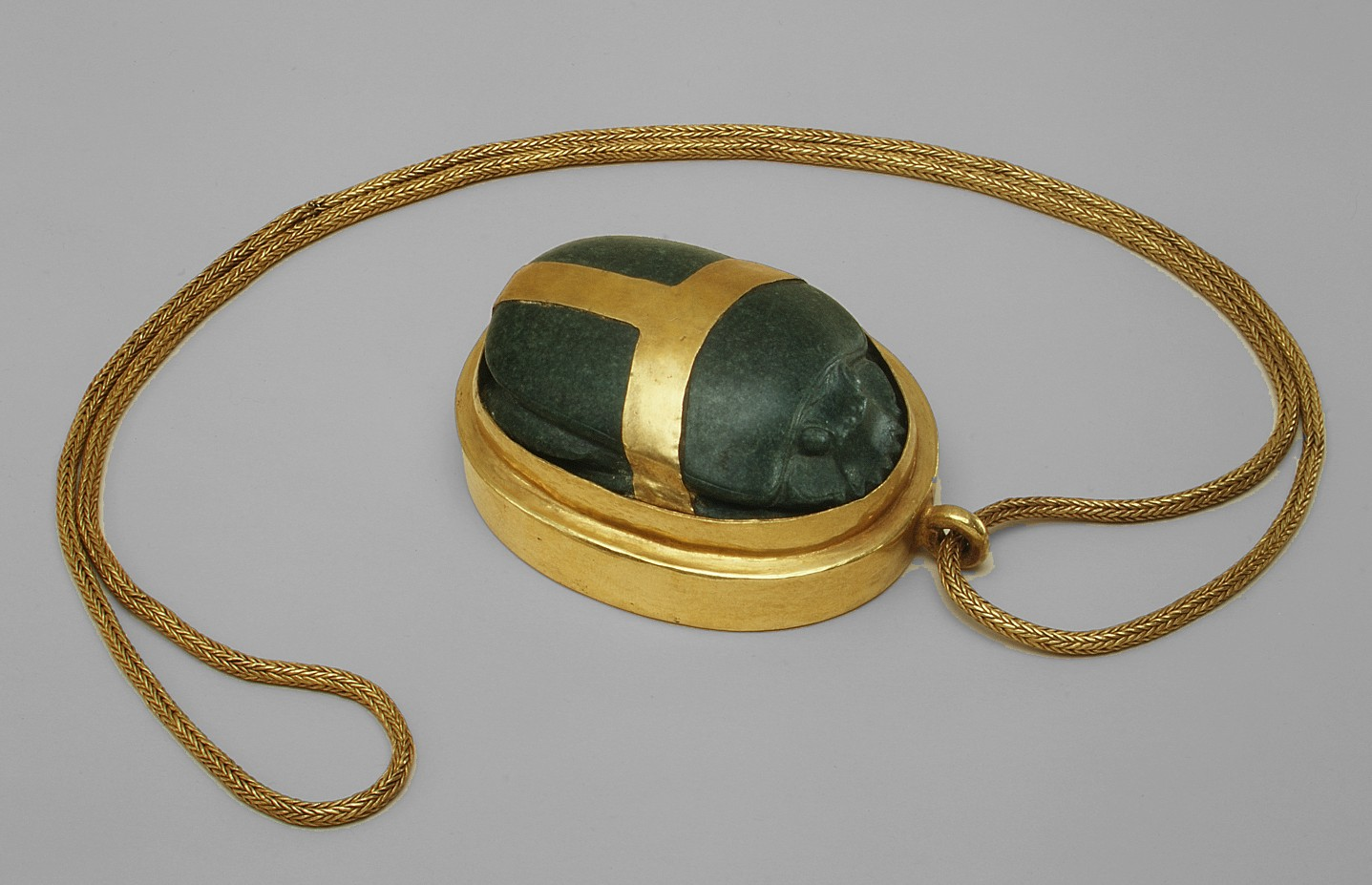
The Heart Scarab of Hatnefer, on display at the Metropolitan Museum of Art

Ramose and Hatnofer's tomb was located not far from the chapel (TT71) of their son Senemut and contained their mummies. It was found intact by Wiliam Hayes and Ambrose Lansing of the Metropolitan Museum's Egyptian expedition in excavation work conducted under a hillside terrace at Sheikh Abd el-Qurna hill in Western Thebes during the 1935–1936 archaeological season. Ramose and Hatnofer were buried in the tomb along with six other unidentified and poorly wrapped mummies (three women and three children) who are presumed to be family members of the couple. Initially, Lansing and Hayes interpreted the six bodies as grisly evidence that Senenmut's family had been struck by a sudden tragedy:

...that eight persons of the same family or group should have died so nearly at the same time that they could be buried together on one occasion is certainly extraordinary, but seems, nevertheless, to be what happened.

Some Egyptologists believe that all burials in their tomb took place at the same time. However, during the New Kingdom, it was customary to use a tomb's burial chambers for several family members, who died at different times. As Joyce Tyldesley notes, it is far more likely that these six additional bodies represent members of Senenmut's immediate family:

who had previously been buried nearby; their decayed [mummy] wrappings and disarticulated skeletons encrusted with mud suggest that they too had been retrieved from less impressive cemeteries. The re-burial of private individuals, while not common, was certainly not unknown at this time, and Senenmut's filial devotion would have met with general approval.

These six other burials, all from the early eighteenth dynasty "were found in the loose scree of the hillside as well as deposits of hunting weapons and the coffins of a horse and an ape". Ramose and Hatnofer's tomb conveys a comparatively simple impression and was initially considered, by Egyptologists, as evidence for the humble personal origins of Ramose in particular.

Modern Metropolitan Museum archaeologists have convincingly demonstrated that the personal possessions in the tomb of Hatnofer and Ramose were Hatnofer's alone, since the items were all appropriate for a woman. Of the mummies in the chamber, Hatnofer's alone:

had been carefully mummified in linen from Hatshepsut's royal estate and equipped with a complete funeral outfit consisting of a gilded mask, a heart scarab, funerary papyri, and canopic equipment. By contrast, Ramose in his painted anthropoid coffin and the other six mummies (three young women and three children) interred in the two plain deal coffins had received no such attention, and their remains were mere skeletons.

=== Evidence for kingship of Hatshepsut ===
Hatnofer's grave is notable for featuring the earliest known date from Hatshepsut's reign. A collection of grave goods found in the tomb chamber contained a single pottery jar or amphorae—which was stamped with the date 'Year 7', a marker for her reign. Another jar from the same collection—which was discovered in situ by the Metropolitan Museum of Art expedition—was stamped with the seal of the 'God's Wife Hatshepsut' while two jars bore the seal of The Good Goddess Maatkare her kingly name. The dating of the amphorae that had been "sealed into the [tomb] burial chamber by the debris from Senenmut's own tomb," is certain and establishes that Hatshepsut was recognised by her subjects as the king of Egypt by Year 7 of her reign.

== Differing interpretations for the background of Senenmut's parents ==
Ramose only held the title and non-specific epithet of zab ('the worthy') in his tomb. The excavators of the tomb assumed, therefore, that Ramose was once only a simple farmer since "The Worthy" was "a polite but somewhat meaningless appellation invariably used for the respected dead." However, it is often noted in the archaeological evidence, that many high state officials including some viziers carried the title zab even if it was only a post-mortem reference to them. This title, therefore, states almost nothing about the social origins of Ramose. Since Senenmut was able to join the roughly 10% of Egyptian society who were educated and later, won favour as Hatshepsut's chief architect, it seems highly unlikely that Ramose was a mere farmer; instead Ramose must have held a higher position in Egyptian society to enable his son to be literate.

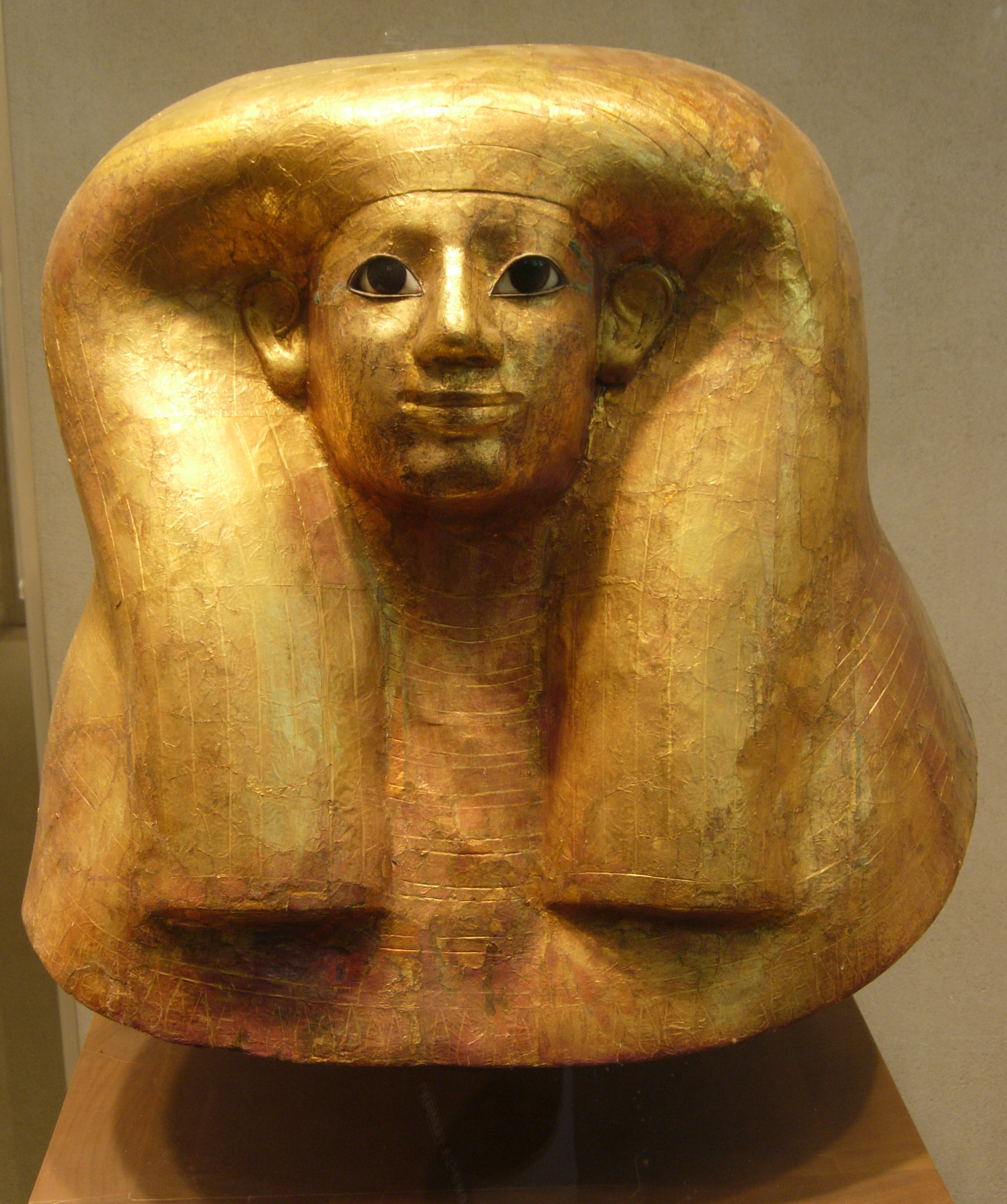
Hatnofer's gilded funerary mask (Metropolitan Museum of Art)

More remarkable, however, is the comparison of the funerals of Ramose with that of his wife Hatnofer. Hatnofer had a rich gilded funerary mask, heart scarab, canopic jars, papyri, and "a selection of traditional grave goods suitable for a woman" donated for her interment. It is presumed that Hatnofer died after her son had achieved his high state position under Hatshepsut; hence, the rich funerary goods must have been provided for by her influential son, Senenmut. In contrast, Ramose's funerary goods only featured his coffin, inferior funerary equipment. Researchers posited that perhaps Senenmut's position in the Egyptian state was still comparatively minor when his father died, but that when Hatnofer died of old age between Year 6 or Year 7 of Hatshepsut, Senenmut was now wealthy enough to arrange to have his father Ramose resurrected from "his more lowly resting-place, hastily re-bandaged, placed in a painted anthropoid coffin and re-united with his wife" Hatnofer who had been more expensively mummified in their hillside tomb. That the coffin of Ramose was fitted with gold which thereby implied some social status for him. The absence of an expected rock cut chapel in Ramose and Hatnofer's tomb is not surprising since few New Kingdom tombs featured such a chapel prior to the reign of Hatshepsut. By performing a more careful and critical examination of the sources, it would appear that Ramose was perhaps already a minor official of the early eighteenth dynasty during his career. The ascent of his son to the highest public offices rests perfectly within the bounds of possibility of Ancient Egyptian society. However, Tyldesley stresses that:

The Ancient Egyptians did not suffer from any sense of false modesty. They felt that their official titles were an important part of the personality, and it was customary for all ranks and decorations, no matter how trivial, to be recorded for posterity. An Egyptian would only have considered omitting a lowly or unimportant title from his parents' tomb if it had been superseded by more prestigious accolade. We must, therefore, assume that Ramose and Hatnofer, with their rather modest epithets and undistinguished tomb, did not play a prominent role in public life.

Another explanation for the differences in the grave goods is that the tomb of Ramose was robbed shortly after his burial and that Ramose was reburied with his wife when she died and received the grave goods found in her burial. Again, this makes it difficult to pinpoint any social background for Ramose and Senenmut, as it would be impossible to make any statements about the quality of his original burial equipment.

Hatnofer—the daughter of a lady named Sitdjehuty—was simply identified as 'Mistress of the House', which was a very general title awarded to married women. When Hatnofer died, she was a short, at just over five feet tall, but somewhat stout lady of about 60 years old. Hatnofer was interred with several mirrors which were made of highly polished bronze or silver set into wood or metal handles as well as a bronze razor, which was found along with other cosmetic devices inside a basket in her tomb.
