= Senenmut =

Ancient Egyptian architect

- High Steward of the King
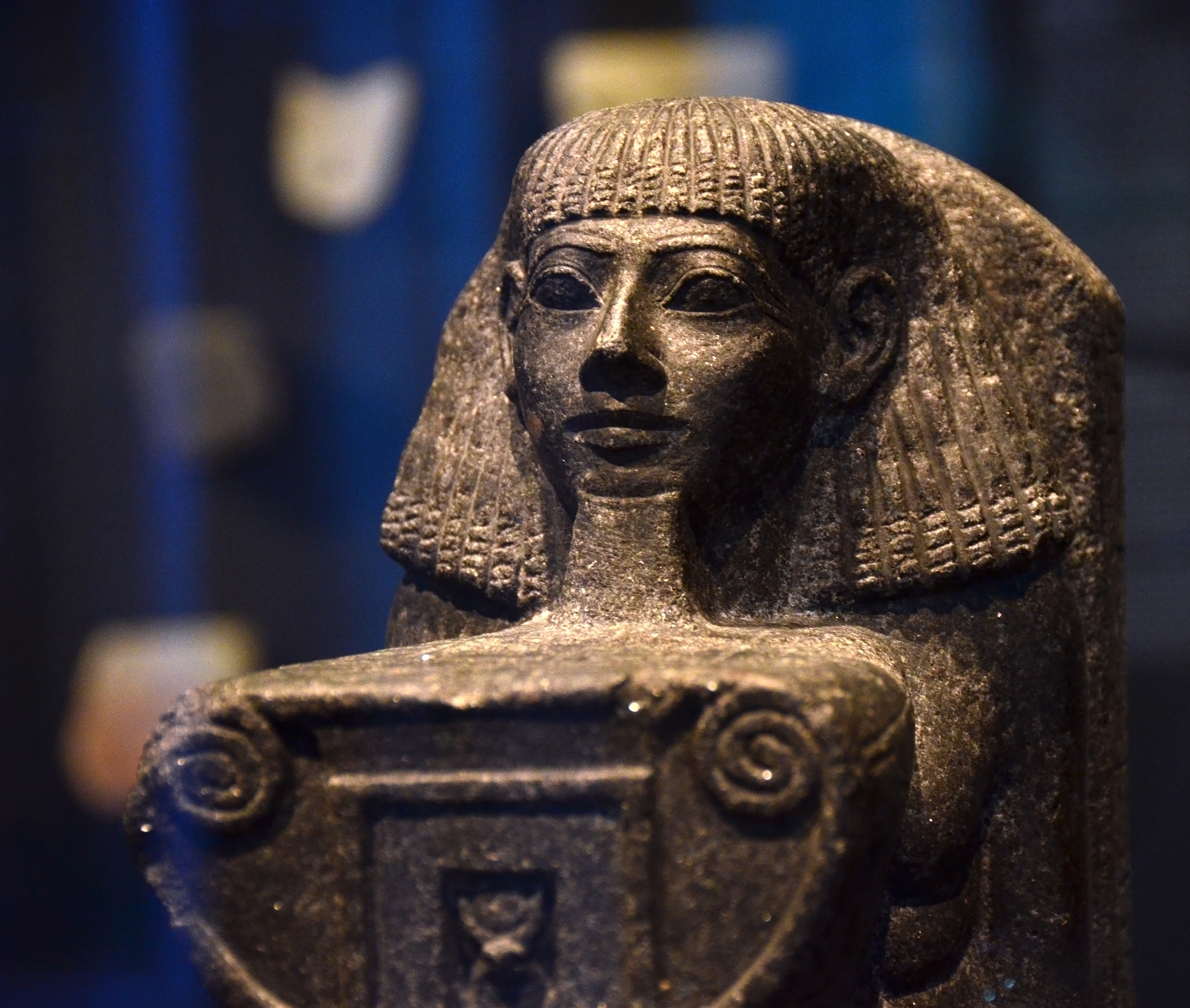
- Detail of a kneeling statue of Senenmut. Staatliche Sammlung für Ägyptische Kunst, Munich.
Egyptian name
sn n mwt
- Dynasty: 18th Dynasty
- Pharaoh: Hatshepsut
- Burial: TT71
- Father: Ramose
- Mother: Hatnofer

Senenmut (Ancient Egyptian: sn-n-mwt, sometimes spelled Senmut, Senemut, or Senmout) was an 18th Dynasty ancient Egyptian architect and government official. His name means "brother of Mut", but can also translate literally as "brother of the mother"; i.e. "uncle".

== Family ==
Senenmut was of low commoner birth, born to literate provincial parents, Ramose and Hatnofer (or "Hatnefret") from Iuny (modern Armant). Senenmut is known to have had three brothers (Amenemhet, Minhotep, and Pairy) and two sisters (Ahhotep and Nofrethor). However, only Minhotep is named outside chapel in his tomb TT71 and in his hypogeum TT353, in an inventory on the lid of a chest found in the burial chamber of Ramose and Hatnofer. More information is known about Senenmut than many other non-royal Egyptians because the joint tomb of his parents (the construction of which Senenmut supervised himself) was discovered intact by the Metropolitan Museum in the mid-1930s and preserved. Christine Meyer has offered compelling evidence to show that Senenmut was a bachelor for his entire life: for instance, Senenmut is portrayed alone with his parents in the funerary stelae of his tombs; he was depicted alone, rather than with a wife, in the vignette of Chapter 110 from the Book of the Dead in hypogeum numbered as TT353 and, finally, it was one of Senenmut's own brothers, and not one of his sons, who was charged with the execution of Senenmut's funerary rites.

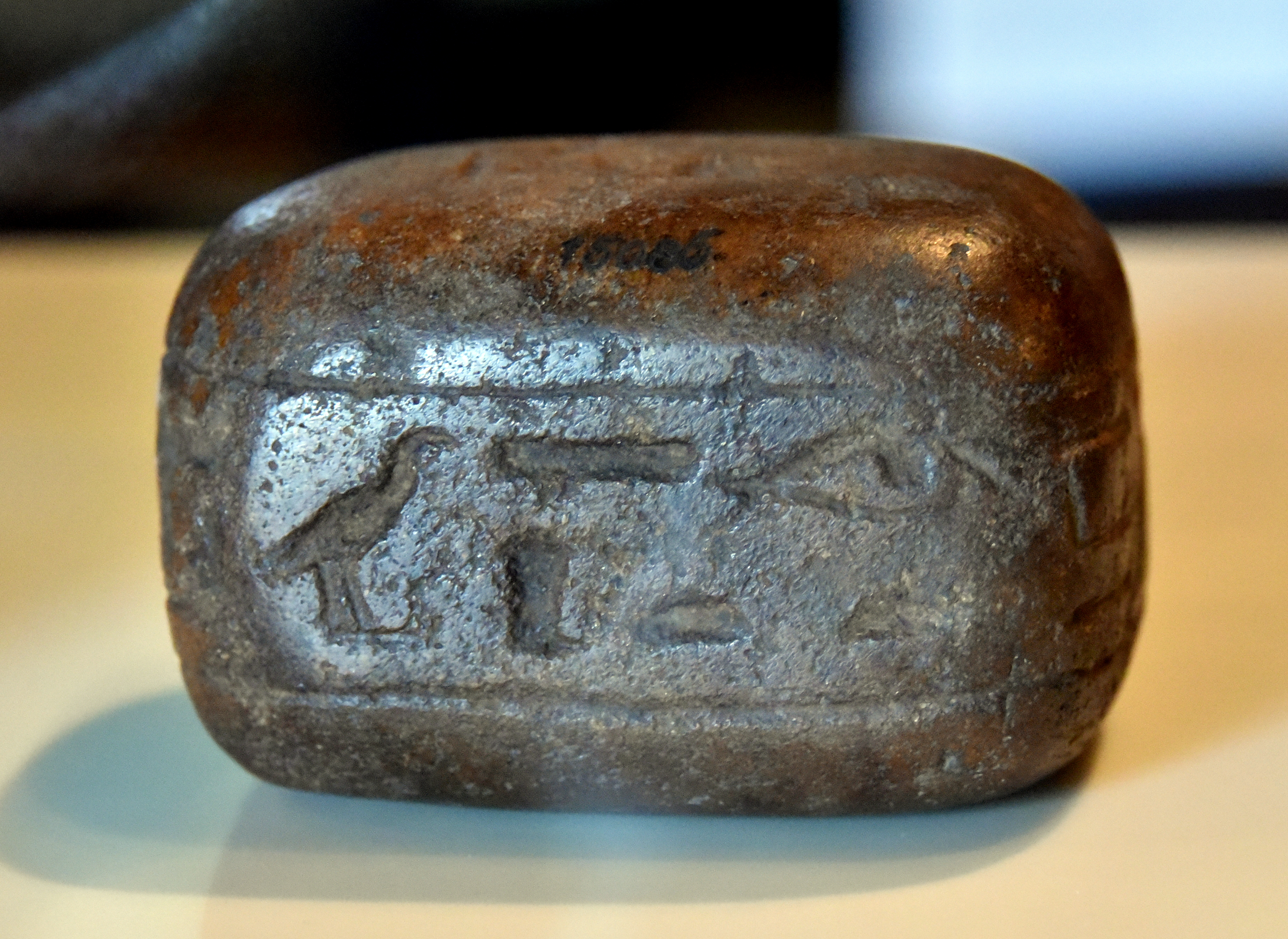
Stone inscribed with the name of Senenmut, from Thebes, Egypt. Neues Museum, Berlin

== Career ==
Senenmut first enters the historical record on a national level as the "Steward of the God's Wife" (Hatshepsut) and "Steward of the King's Daughter" (Neferure). Some Egyptologists place Senenmut's entry into royal service during the reign of Thutmose I, but it is far more likely that it occurred during either the reign of Thutmose II or while Hatshepsut was still regent and not pharaoh. After Hatshepsut was crowned pharaoh, Senenmut was given more prestigious titles and became high steward of the king.

Senenmut supervised the quarrying, transport, and erection of twin obelisks, at the time the tallest in the world, at the entrance to the Temple of Karnak. Neither stands today though they were commemorated in the Chapelle Rouge. Karnak's Red Chapel was intended as a barque shrine and may have originally stood between the two obelisks. (The remaining obelisks of Hatshepsut were erected in Year Fifteen as part of her Heb Sed Festival; one still stands in the Temple of Karnak whilst the other is in pieces, having fallen many centuries ago.)

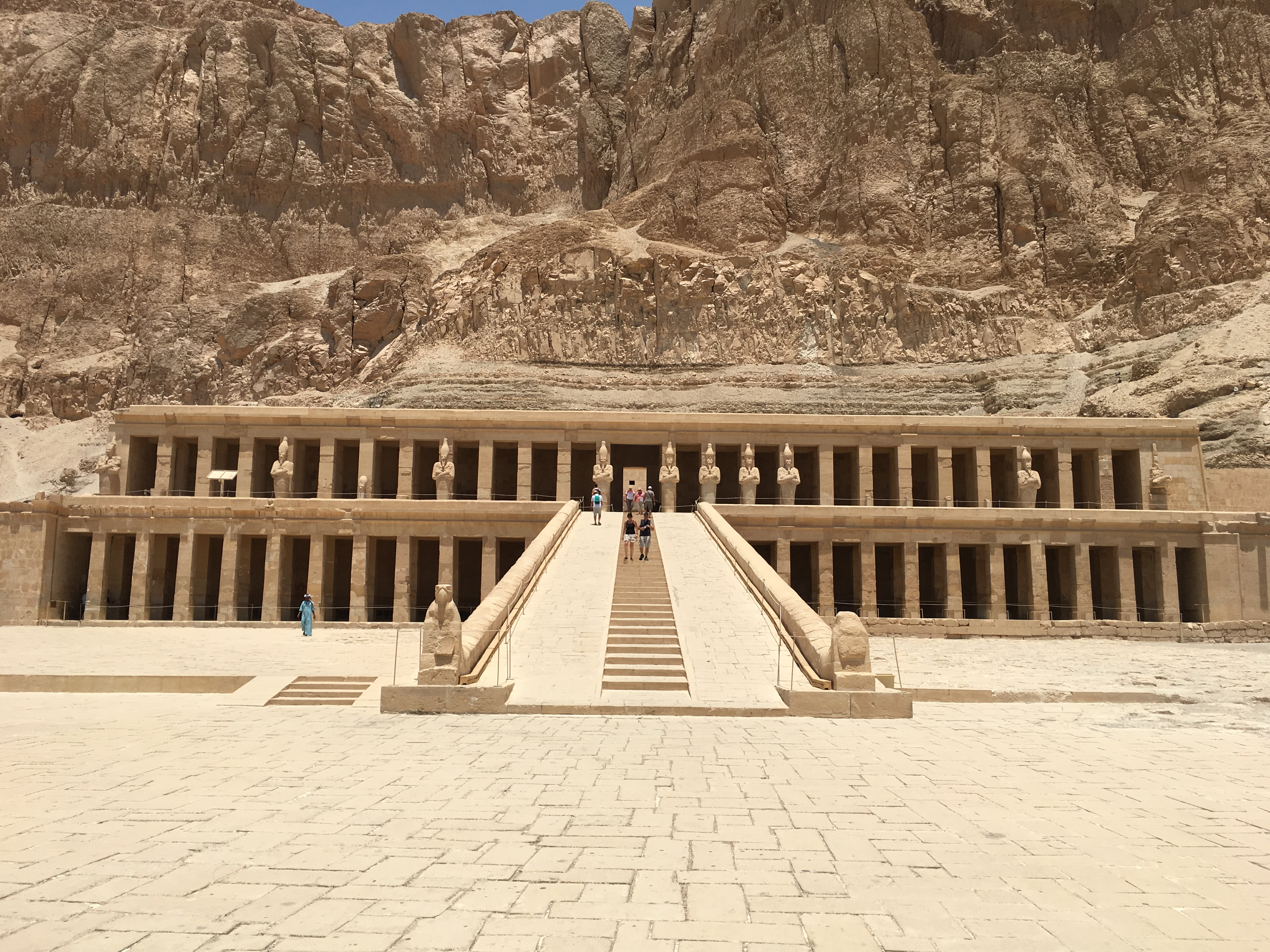
The Mortuary Temple of Hatshepsut

Senenmut claims to be the chief architect of Hatshepsut's works at Deir el-Bahri. Senenmut's masterpiece building project was the Mortuary Temple of Hatshepsut, also known as the Djeser-Djeseru, designed and implemented by Senenmut on a site on the west bank of the Nile, close to the entrance to the Valley of the Kings. The focal point was the Djeser-Djeseru or "the Sublime of the Sublimes" mortuary temple-('Holy (of) Holiests'), a colonnaded structure of perfect harmony built nearly one thousand years before the Parthenon. Djeser-Djeseru sits atop a series of terraces that were once graced with gardens. It is built into a cliff face that rises sharply above it. Djeser-Djeseru and the other buildings of the Deir el-Bahri complex are considered to be among the great buildings of the ancient world. The building complex design is thought to be derived from the mortuary temple of Mentuhotep II built nearly 500 years earlier at Deir-el-Bahri. Senenmut's importance at the royal court under Hatshepsut is unquestionable:

he was able to lay immediate claim to prime construction sites at Sheikh Abd el-Qurna and Deir el Bahri itself for the excavation of his tomb chapel and burial chamber.

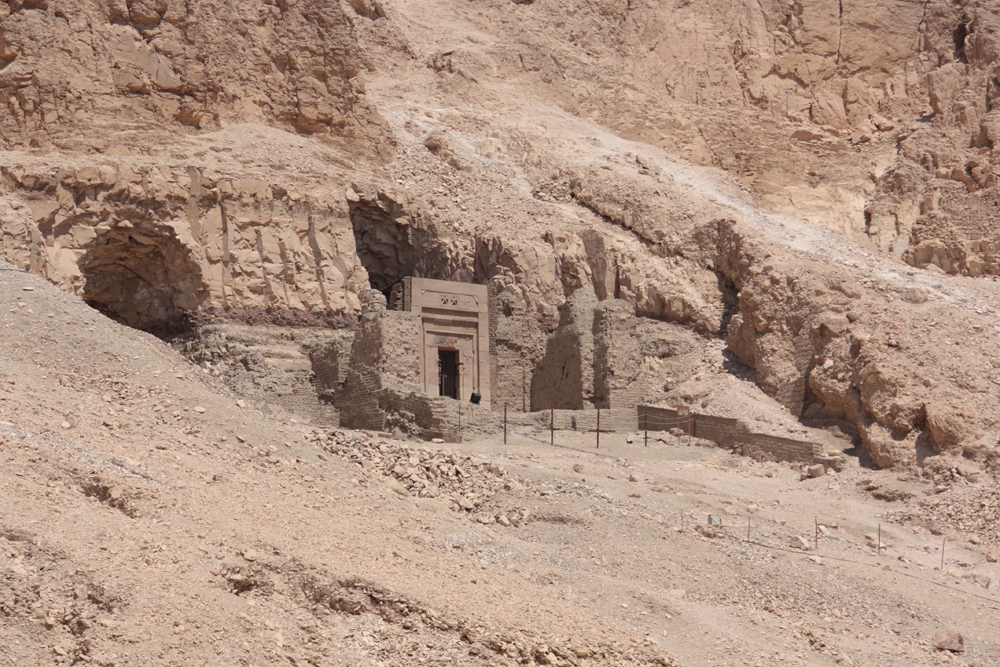
TT 353 - a hypogeum commissioned by Senenmut, 97m long and 41m deep

Senenmut's Theban Tomb 71 was started late in Year 7, "shortly after Hatshepsut's accession, the death of Hatnofer, and Hatnofer's interment with the exhumed remains of several family members", while the "excavation on the chapel seems to have continued until after Year 7" of the female pharaoh's reign. Senenmut's tomb appears to have enjoyed Hatshepsut's favour and "his portrayal in the Punt reliefs certainly postdates Year 9" of Hatshepsut.

The earliest known astronomical ceiling in Egypt is found as a main part of a decor in the hypogeum-cenotaph of Senenmut. The astronomical ceiling in Senenmut’s hypogeum (numbered as TT 353) is divided into two sections, representing the northern and southern skies. This indicates another dimension of his career, suggesting that he was an ancient astronomer as well.

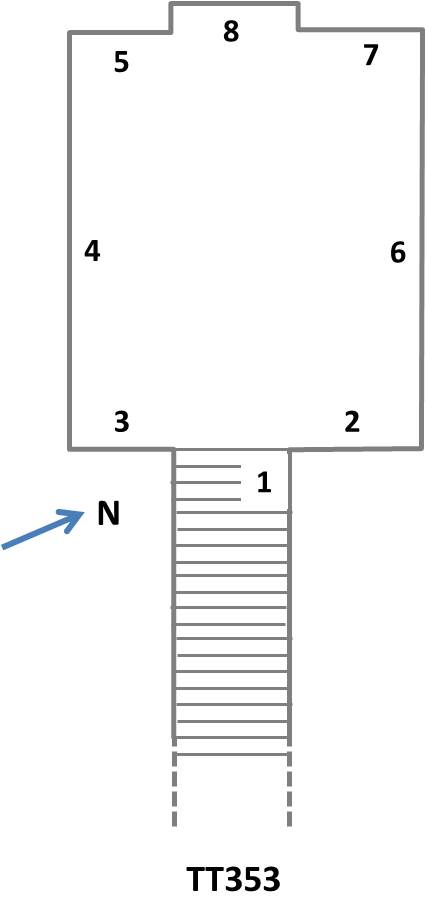
Plan of hypogeum numbered as tomb TT353

Some Egyptologists have theorized that Senenmut was Hatshepsut's lover. Facts that are typically cited to support the theory are that Hatshepsut allowed Senenmut to place his name and an image of himself behind one of the main doors in Djeser-Djeseru, and the presence of graffiti in an unfinished tomb used as a rest house by the workers of Djeser-Djeseru depicting a male and a hermaphrodite in pharaonic regalia engaging in an explicit sexual act.

Although it is not known where he is buried, Senenmut had a tomb constructed for himself and a cenotaph-hypogeum. The unfinished tomb is at (TT71) in the Tombs of the Nobles and his cenotaph-hypogeum (numbered as TT353), near Hatshepsut's mortuary temple, and contains a famous star ceiling. They were both heavily vandalized during the reign of Thutmose III, perhaps during the latter's campaign to eradicate all trace of Hatshepsut's memory. Neither tomb by itself was complete, as would be expected of an Egyptian tomb for a person of high standing. TT71 is a typical Theban Tomb with a shaft and unfinished burial chambers. His cenotaph-hypogeum (numbered as TT353) is fully underground without any overground chapel. They complement each other and are only, together, a full burial monument. However, the work carried out on the hypogeum TT353 by the Archaeological Mission of the Instituto de Estudios del Antiguo Egipto (2000-2008), proves that it is a hypogeum to perform Senenmut transformation rites.

== Image gallery ==
=== Ostraca depicting Senenmut ===
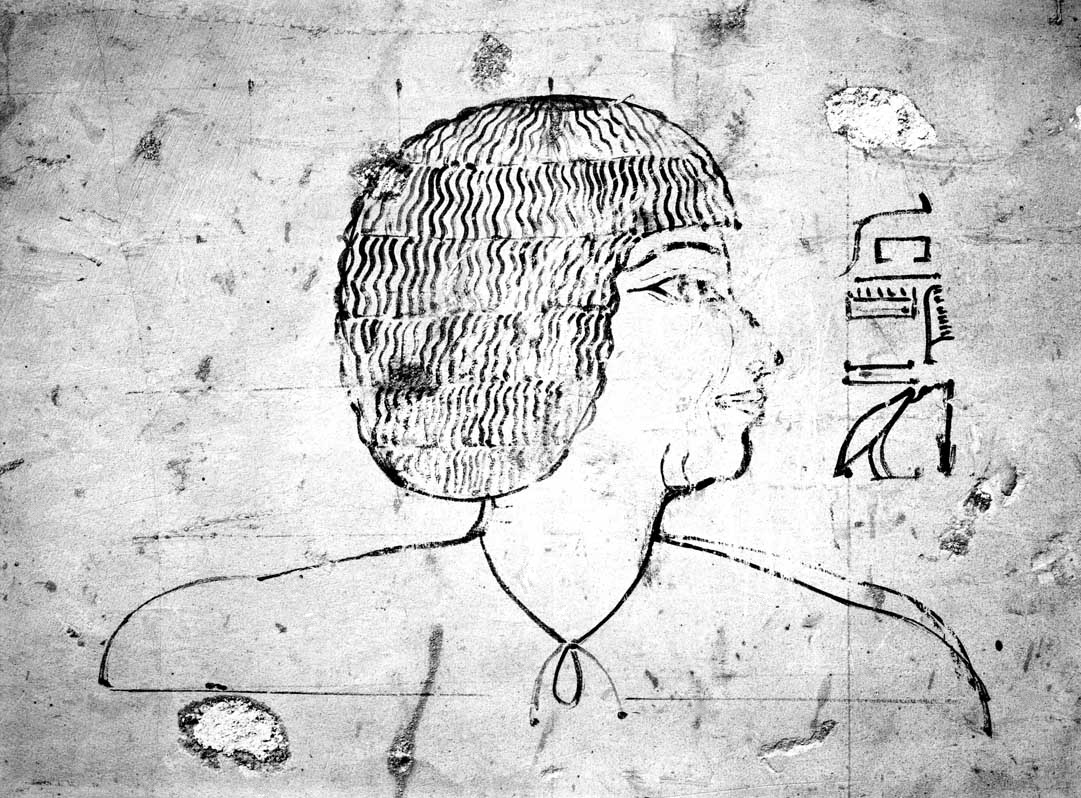
Ostracon found from the dump below Senenmut's tomb chapel (SAE 71), mentioning Senenmut by name and depicting his profile. Now in the Metropolitan Museum.

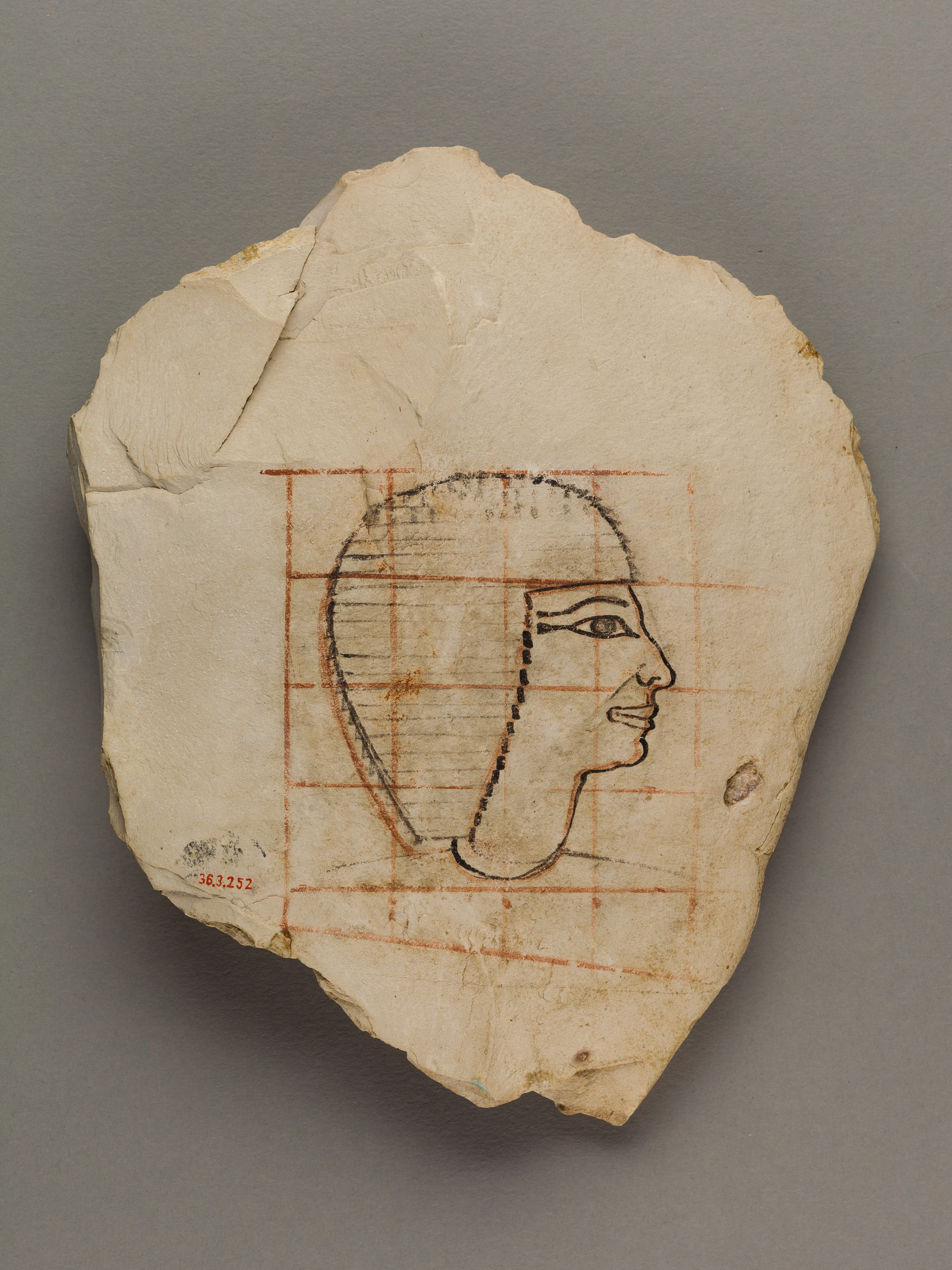
Ostracon found from the dump below Senenmut's tomb chapel (SAE 71) thought to depict his profile. Now in the Metropolitan Museum.

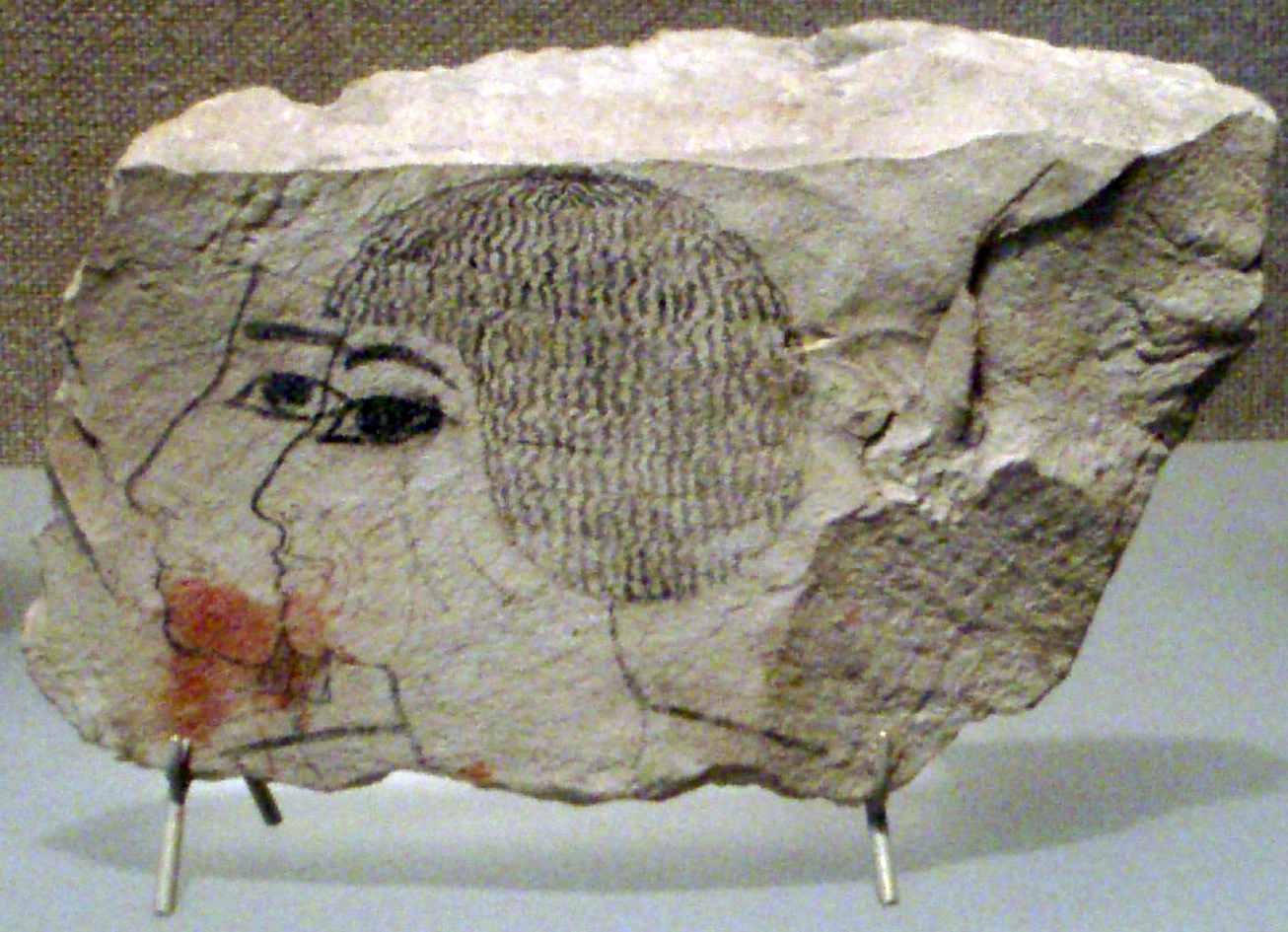
Ostracon of Senemut found from the dump below Senenmut's tomb chapel (SAE 71) thought to depict his double profile. Now in the Metropolitan Museum.

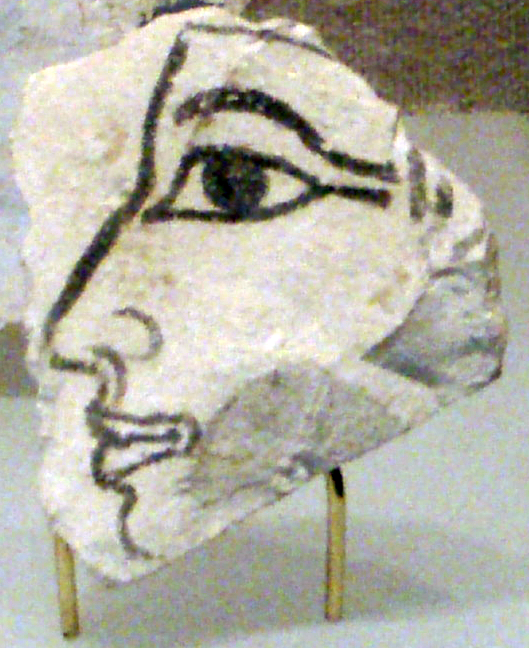
Ostracon found from the dump below Senenmut's tomb chapel (SAE 71) thought to depict his profile. Now in the Metropolitan Museum.

=== Works from his tombs ===
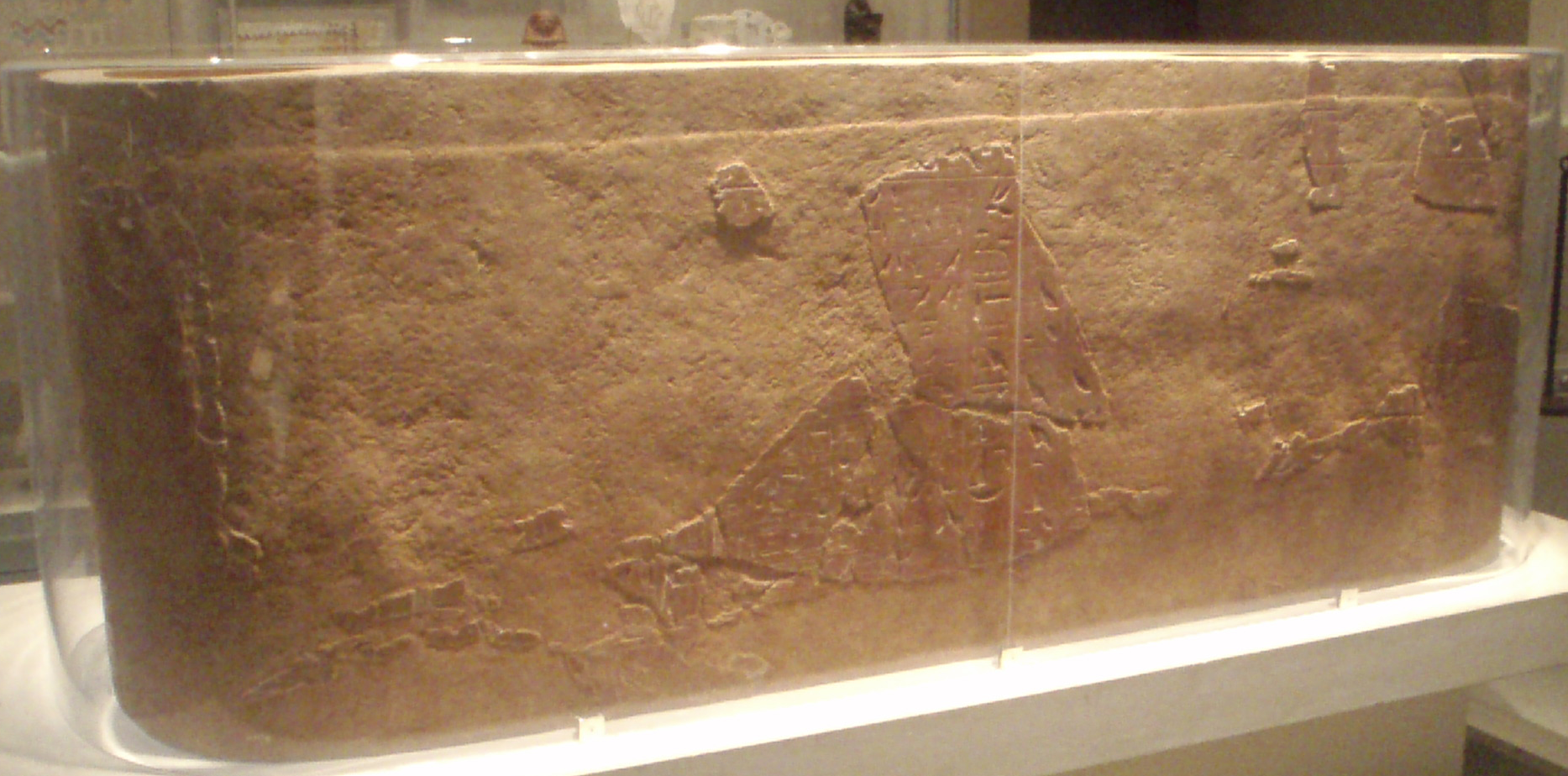
The only known example of a private sarcophagus made of the same stone normally reserved for royals. It is unlikely that Senenmut was ever interred in it, due to its unfinished nature. Now in the Metropolitan Museum.

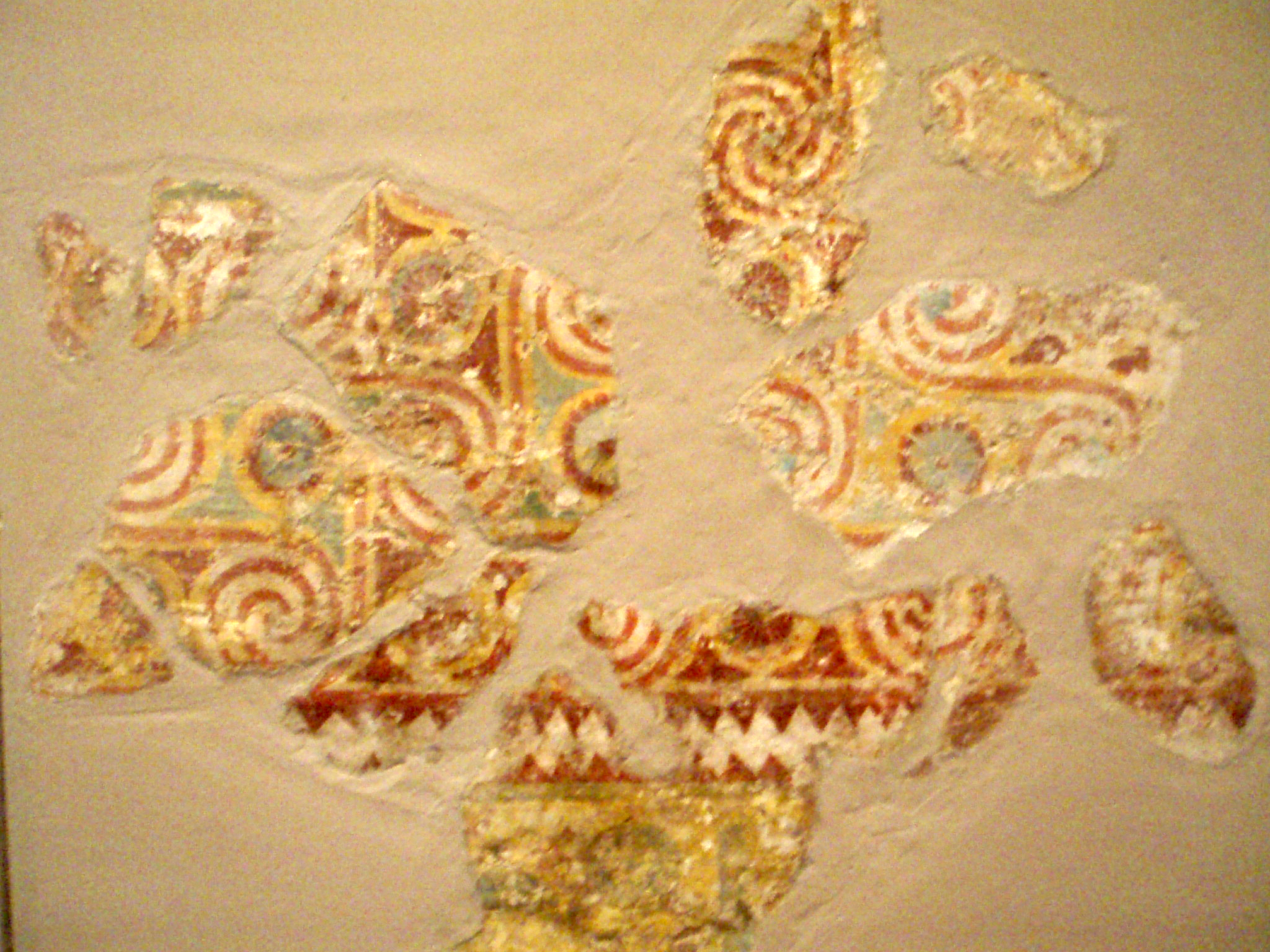
Painted ceiling decoration from the tomb of Senenmut (SAE 71). Now in the Metropolitan Museum.

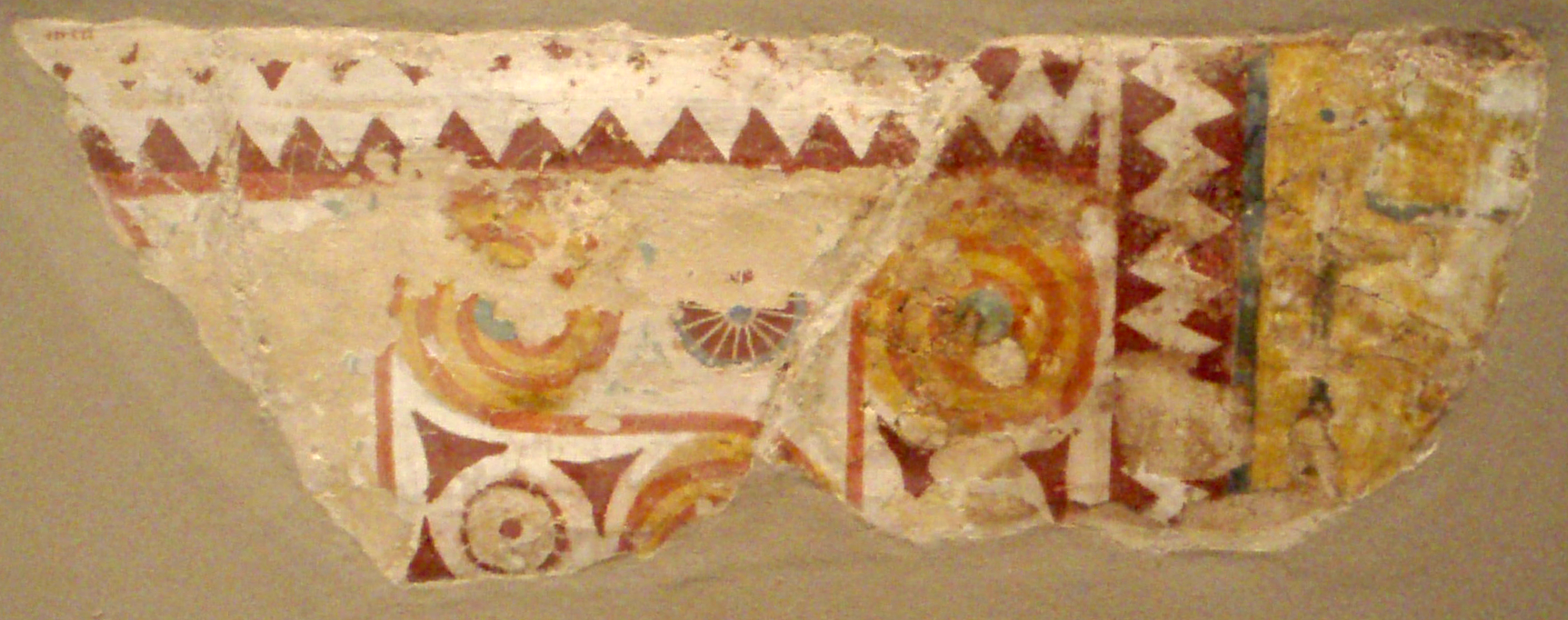
Painted ceiling decoration from the tomb of Senenmut (SAE 71). Now in the Metropolitan Museum.

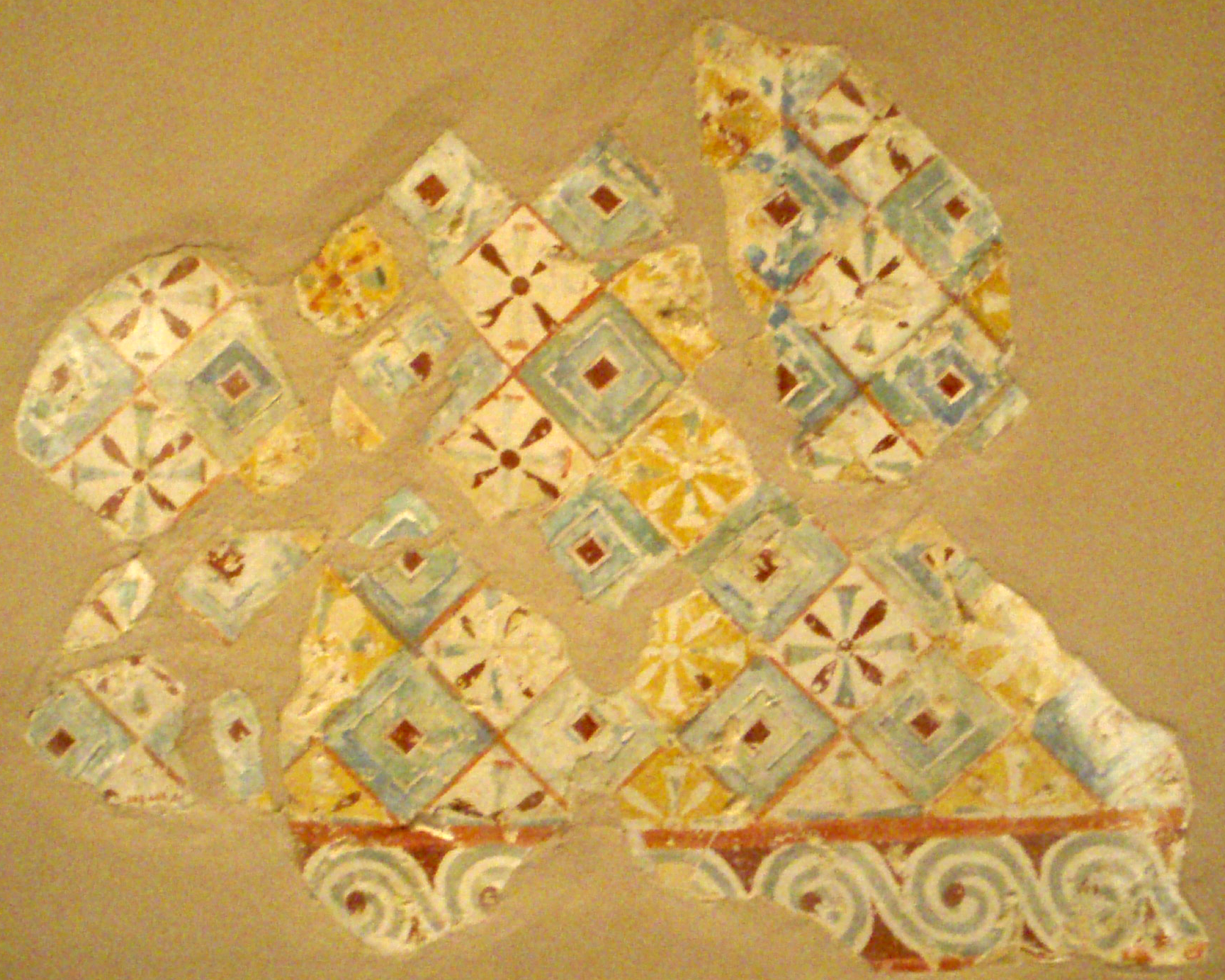
Painted ceiling decoration from the tomb of Senenmut (SAE 71). Now in the Metropolitan Museum.

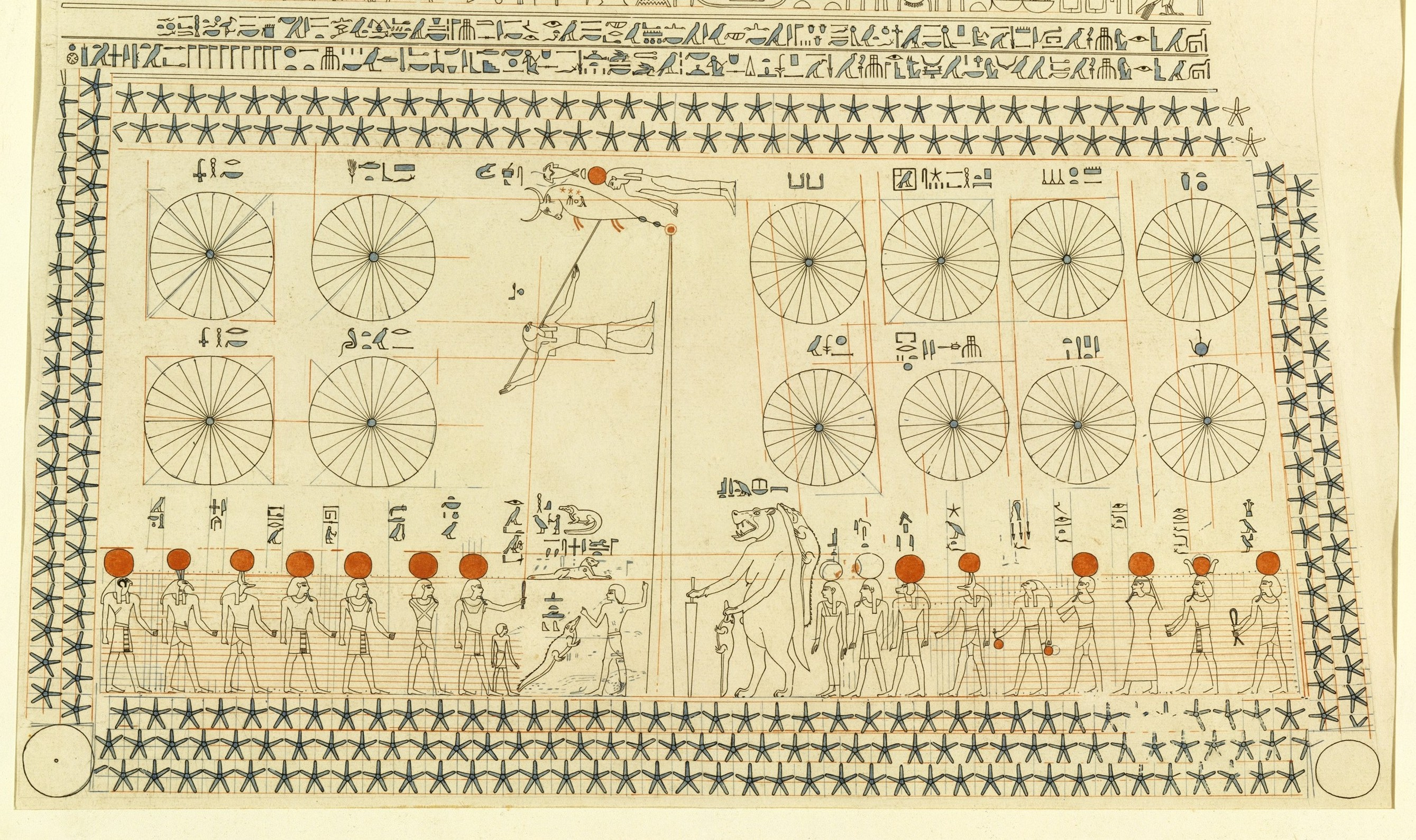
Bottom portion of Astronomical chart, drawn in the Amduat style.

=== Sculptures ===
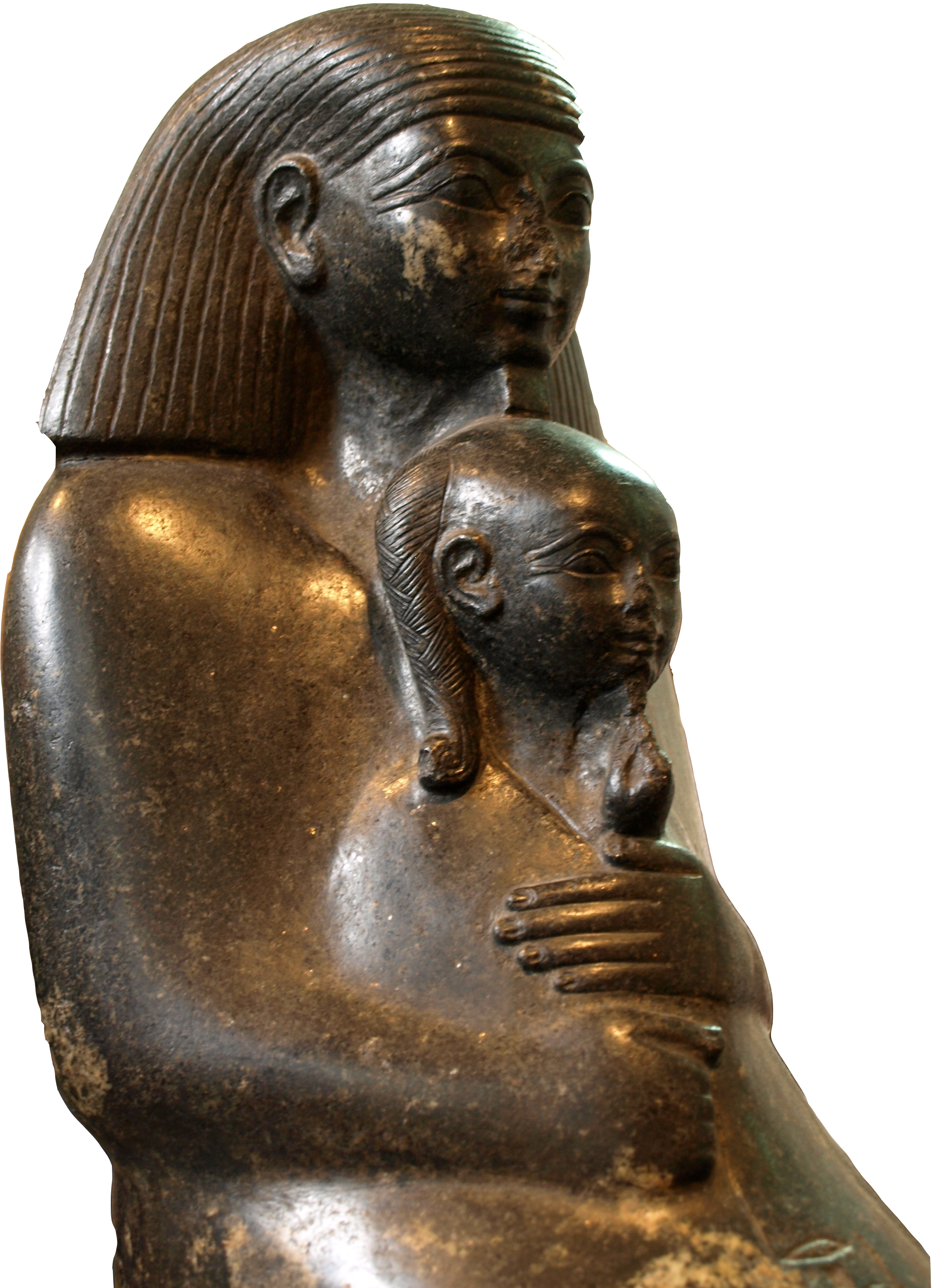
Seated Senenmut holding the princess Neferure in his arms, on display at the British Museum.

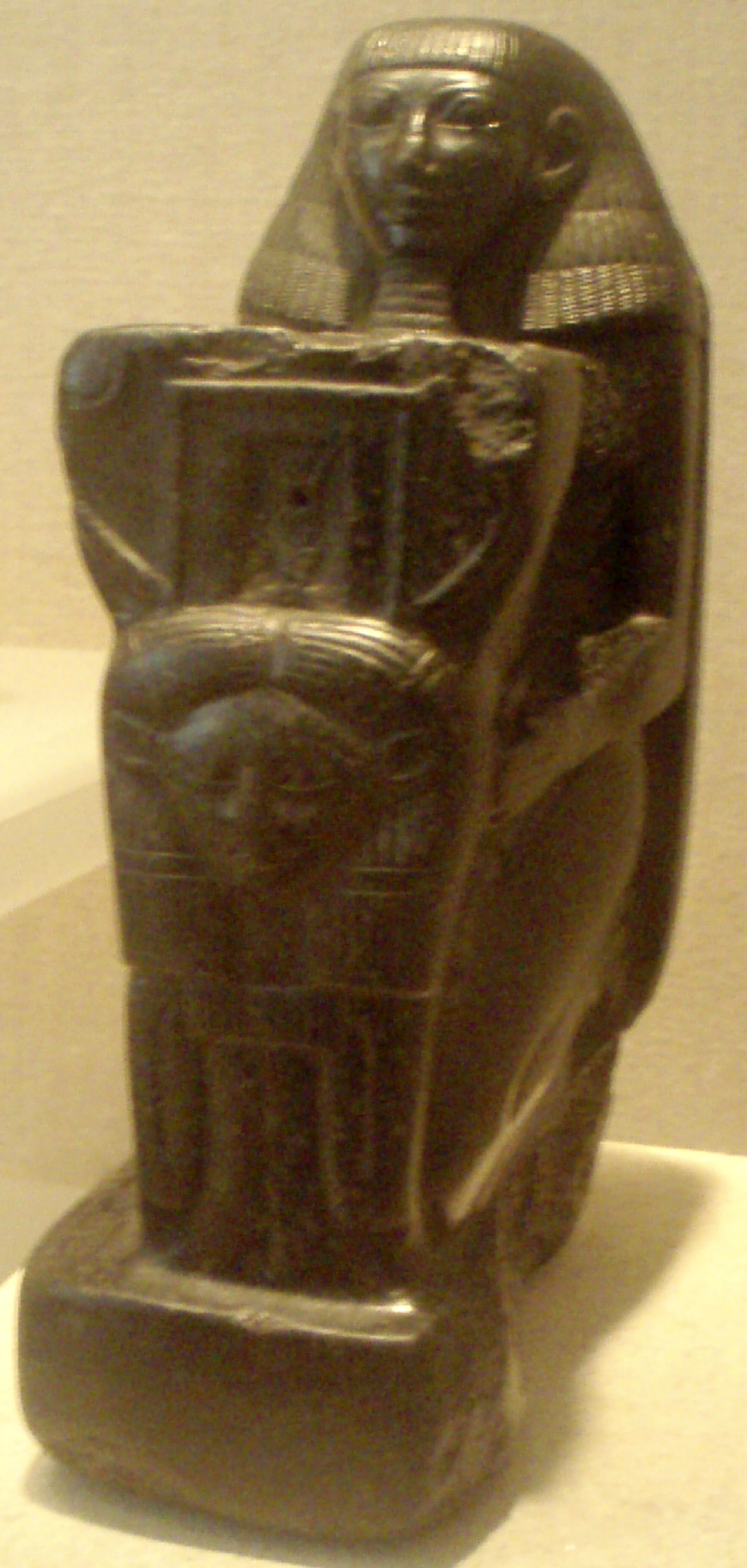
A kneeling statue of Senenmut, now in the Metropolitan Museum.

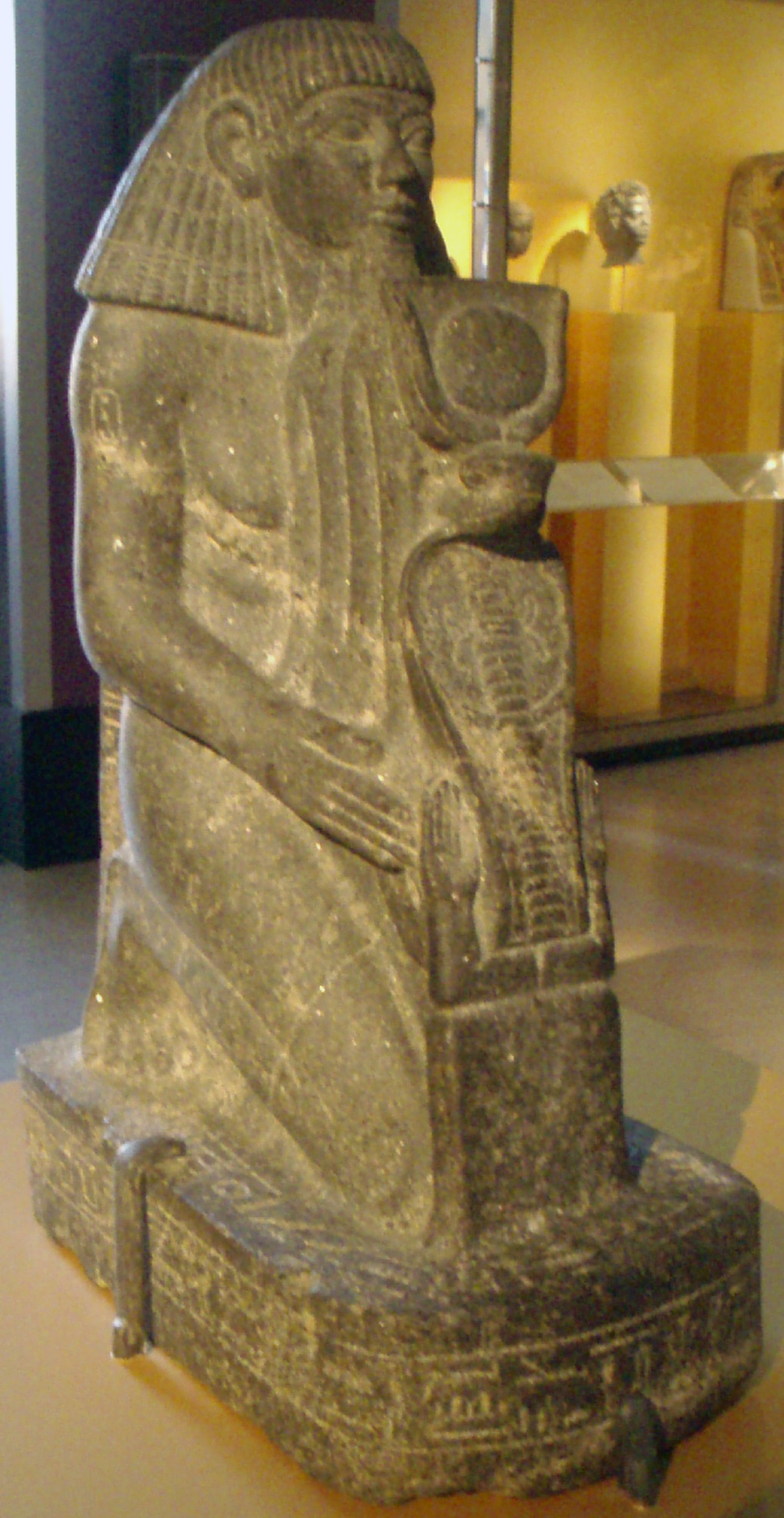
A kneeling statue of Senenmut holding a rebus of Hatshepsut's name, now in the Brooklyn Museum.

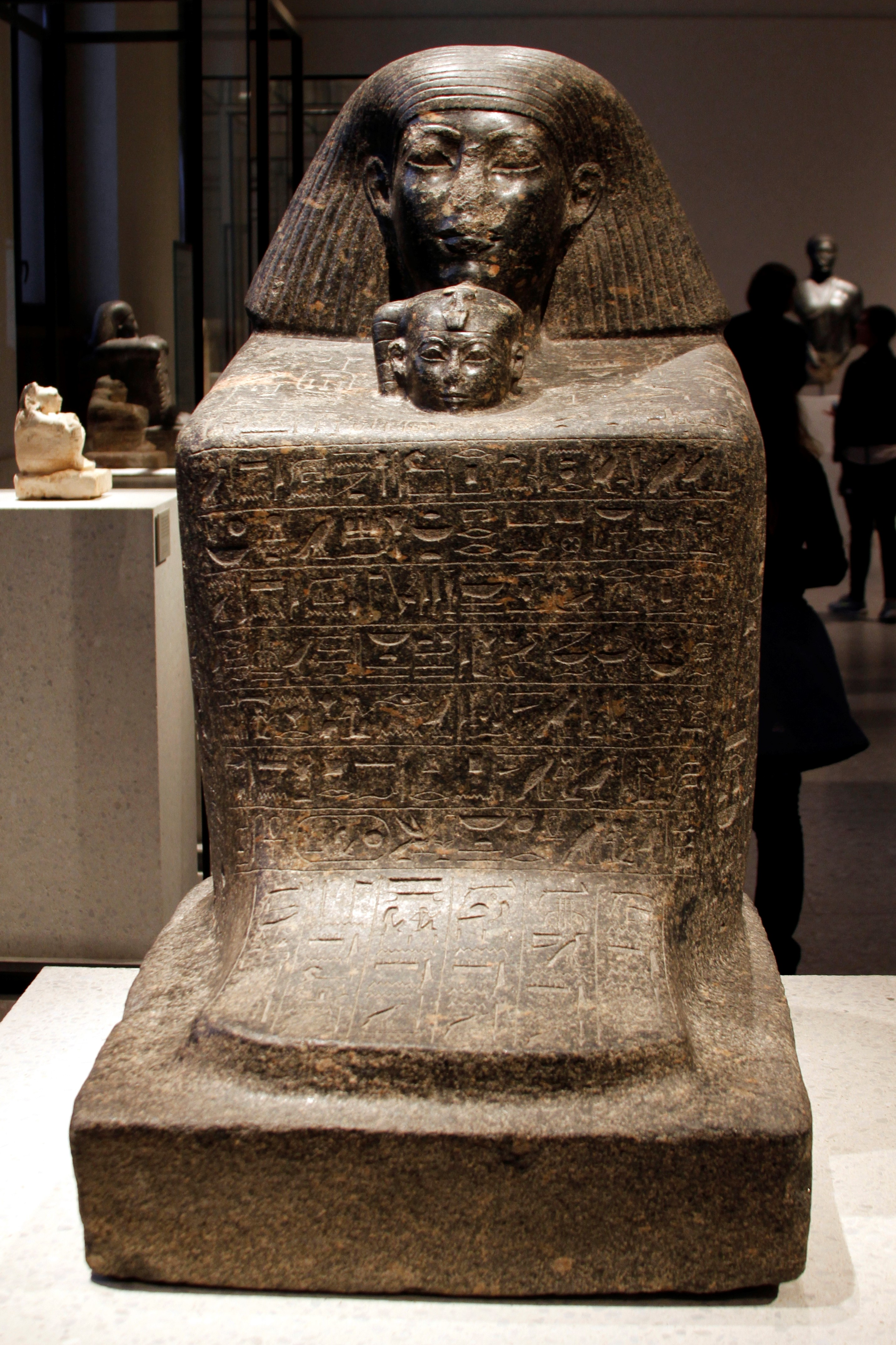
A block statue of Senenmut with the head of Hatshepsut's daughter Neferure appearing below his. From the Ägyptisches Museum, Berlin.

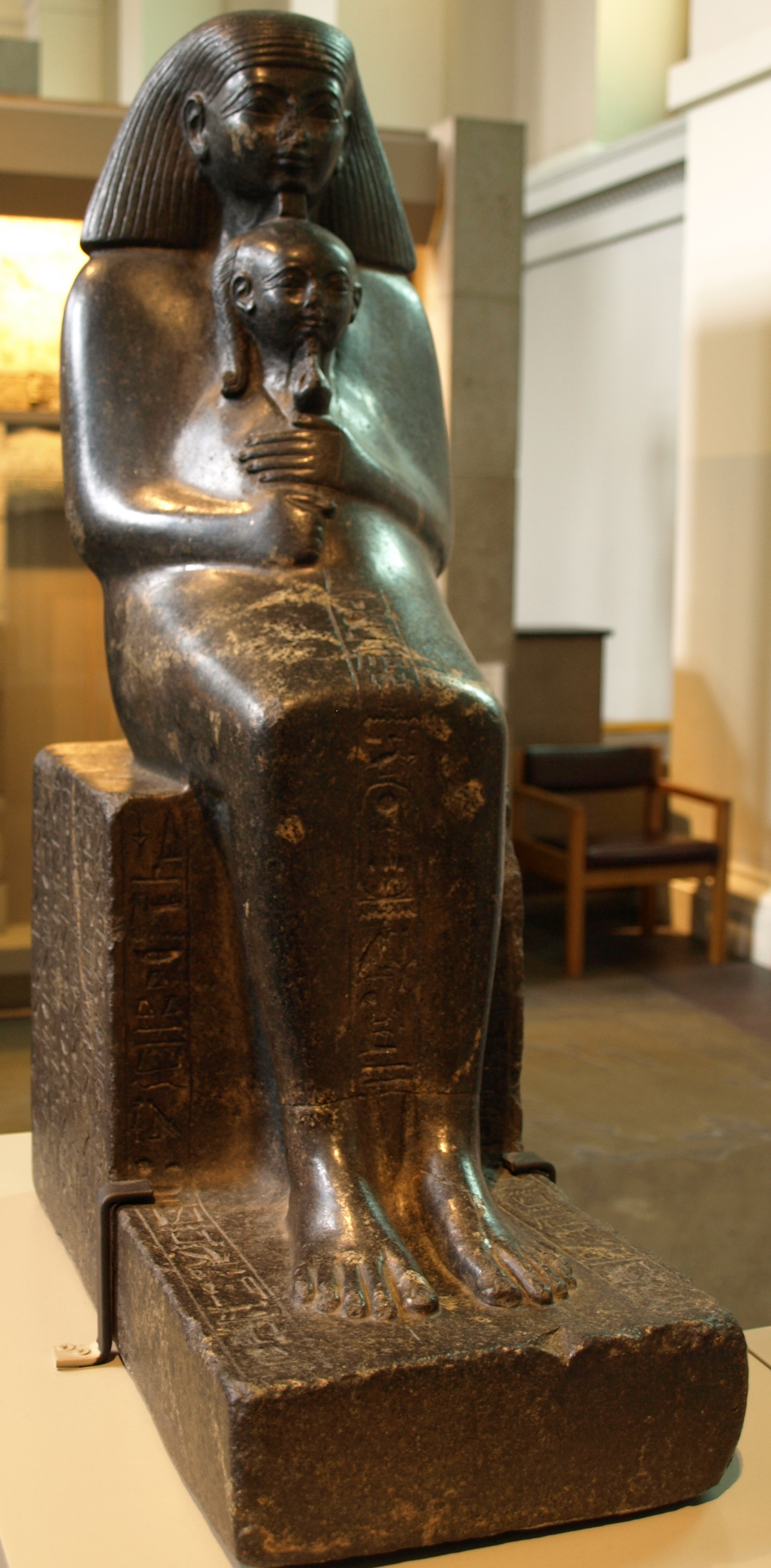
Statue of Senenmut and Neferura, originally from the Temple of Karnak at Thebes, now on display at the British Museum.
