= Heart Scarab of Hatnefer =

Jewelry

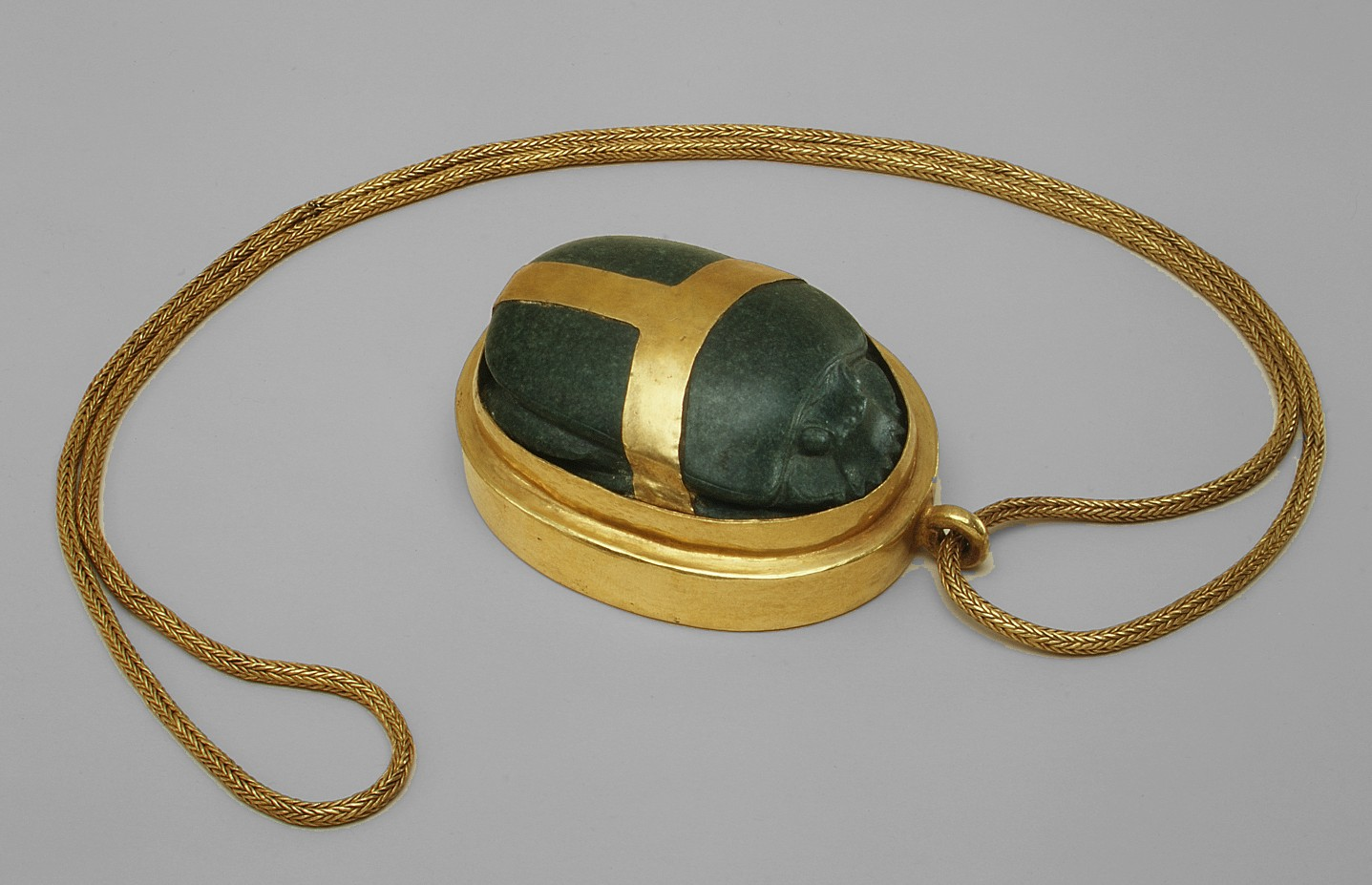
- Artist: Unknown
- Year: c. 1480 B.C
- Medium: Serpentinite and gold
- Location: Metropolitan Museum of Art

The Heart Scarab of Hatnefer is a piece of funerary jewelry dating to the fifteenth century BC. Made of gold and carved serpentinite, the heart scarab was intended to be interred with a woman of importance and was discovered among the artifacts in her tomb, where she and her husband were buried. The amulet was intended to prompt her heart to report her character as qualifying to enter the afterlife and to fulfill that role if the heart might fail to weigh as deserving. The piece is currently in the collection of the Metropolitan Museum of Art in Manhattan.

== Description ==
The work, dating to the Eighteenth Dynasty of Egypt, is intricately detailed; the scarab (a common symbol associated with the god Khepri, who was associated with the renewal of life) at the center of the work is carved from a single mottled grey-green serpentinite stone into the figure. The scarab is mounted on a gold base and is fastened to the base by a gold strap. The piece is suspended as an amulet on a necklace of plaited gold and as such, is used as a heart scarab among funerary artifacts in Ancient Egypt.

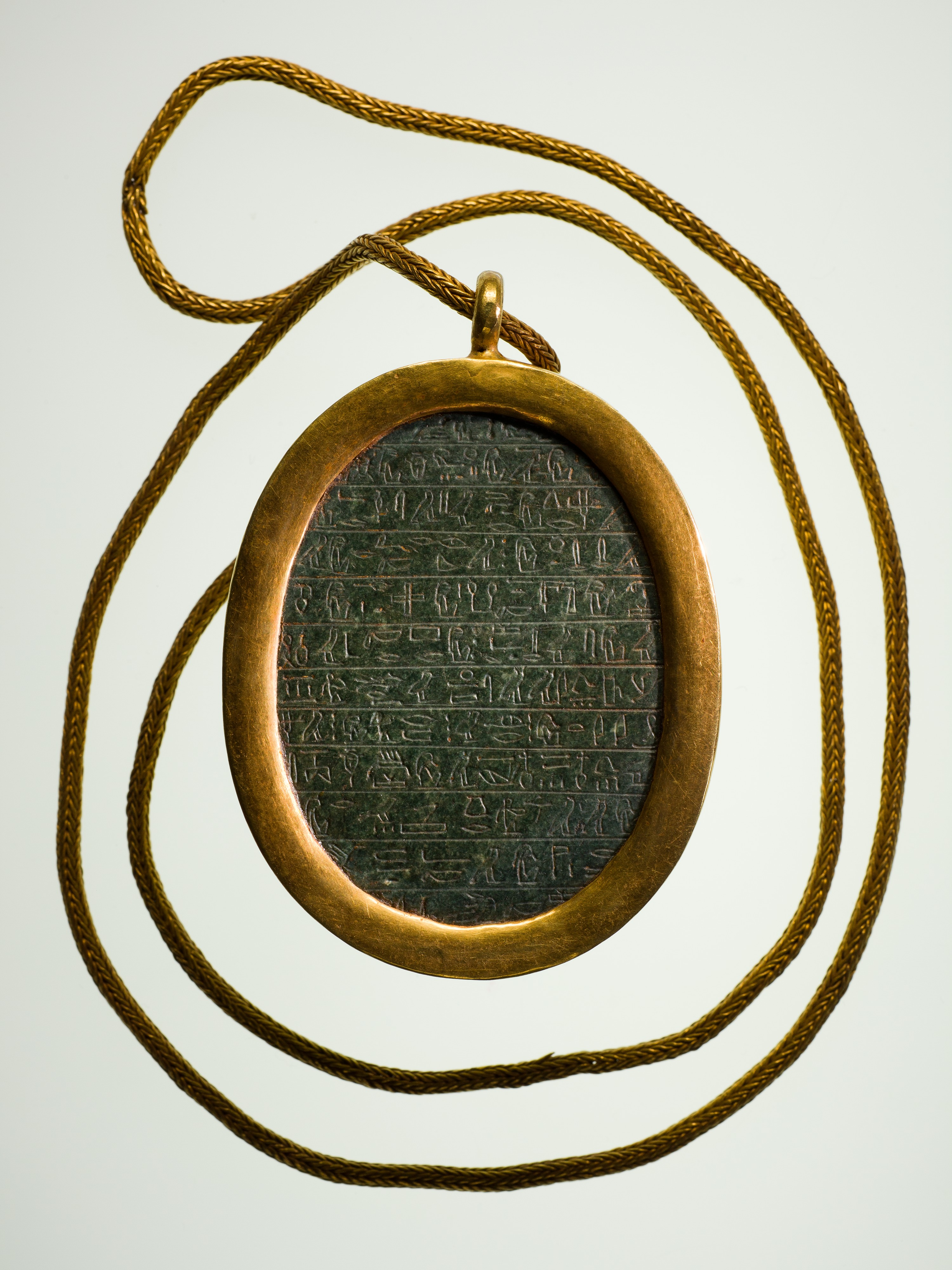
Inscription on the back of the scarab

A chapter from the Book of the Dead is inscribed on the scarab, indicating that the work was intended to be buried with Egyptian noblewoman Hatnefer. The inscription invokes Spell 30 from Chapter A of the Book of the Dead, entreating her heart to represent her well so the deities do not judge Hatnefer adversely in the afterlife during the weighing of her heart by Maat, goddess of truth, justice, order, wisdom, and cosmic balance.

As noted by the Metropolitan Museum of Art, Hatnefer's name was inscribed over another name on the piece, indicating that apparently the scarab originally was inscribed with the name of someone else before being adapted for her.

Peter Dornan, a former curator of Egyptian Art at the museum, translated the Egyptian hieroglyphs on the bottom of the Hatnefer Heart Scarab as follows:

The Mistress of the House, Hatnefer, says: "Heart of my mother, heart of my mother, heart of my (actual) being, do not rise up against me as a witness; do not contend against me in the court of judgment; do not make opposition against me in the presence of the keeper of the balance. You are my bodily ka, a Khnum who has invigorated my limbs. When you ascend to the perfection from which we have come, do not cause our names to stink to the entourage who create mankind in their proper stations, but rather may it go well with us and with the listener, so that the judge may rejoice. Do not devise lies against me in the presence of the deity, for your reckoning is at hand."
