= Heart scarab =

Ancient Egyptian artifact

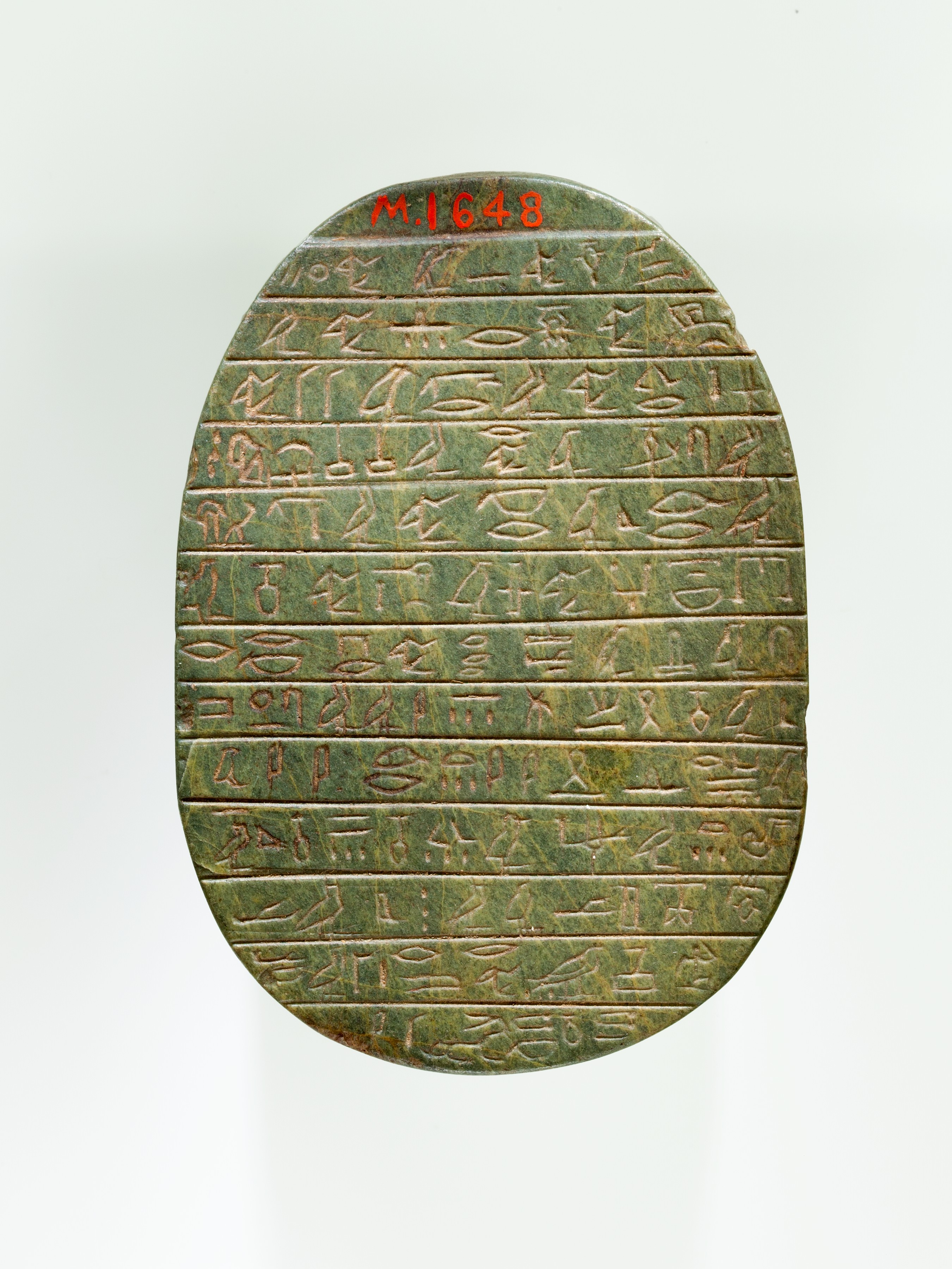
Heart scarab with the owner's name erased, 664–380 B.C.

The heart scarab is an oval scarab artifact dating from ancient Egypt. Mostly an amulet, it also was used as jewelry, a memorializing artifact, or a grave good. The function of the heart scarab according to Ancient Egyptian religion was to bind the heart to silence whilst it was being weighed in the underworld, to ensure that the heart did not bear false witness against the deceased, or to act in its place if necessary. The heart scarab is usually inscribed with Chapter 30B of the Book of the Dead.

== Religious significance ==
The Weighing of the Heart as depicted on the Papyrus of Ani

The significance of the heart scarab to the ancient Egyptians stems from the religious importance of the scarab beetle, Scarabaeus sacer. To the Ancient Egyptians, the scarab beetle represented Khepri, the early morning manifestation of the sun god Ra. They accordingly held the beetle to be sacred, and fabricated scarab amulets in various composition by the early Middle Kingdom until the end of the pharaonic period.

The heart scarab was created for use at the Weighing of the Heart ceremony to testify or vouch on behalf of the owner, should the original heart be unable. In the Duat, the Egyptian underworld, the hearts of the dead were weighed against a single feather from the headdress of the goddess Ma'at. If the heart was lighter they will be allowed to start a long and perilous journey to Aaru, where they will exist in peace and pleasure for eternity. Conversely, hearts that are heavy with evil will tumble from the scale pan and fall into the crocodilian jaws of the goddess Ammit. Any souls that are subject to Ammit's "second death" are doomed to restlessness in the Duat.

Heart scarabs are described in the Book of the Dead to be made of a stone: nmhf, nemehef (not now identified); typically green stones, green jasper, serpentine, and basalt.

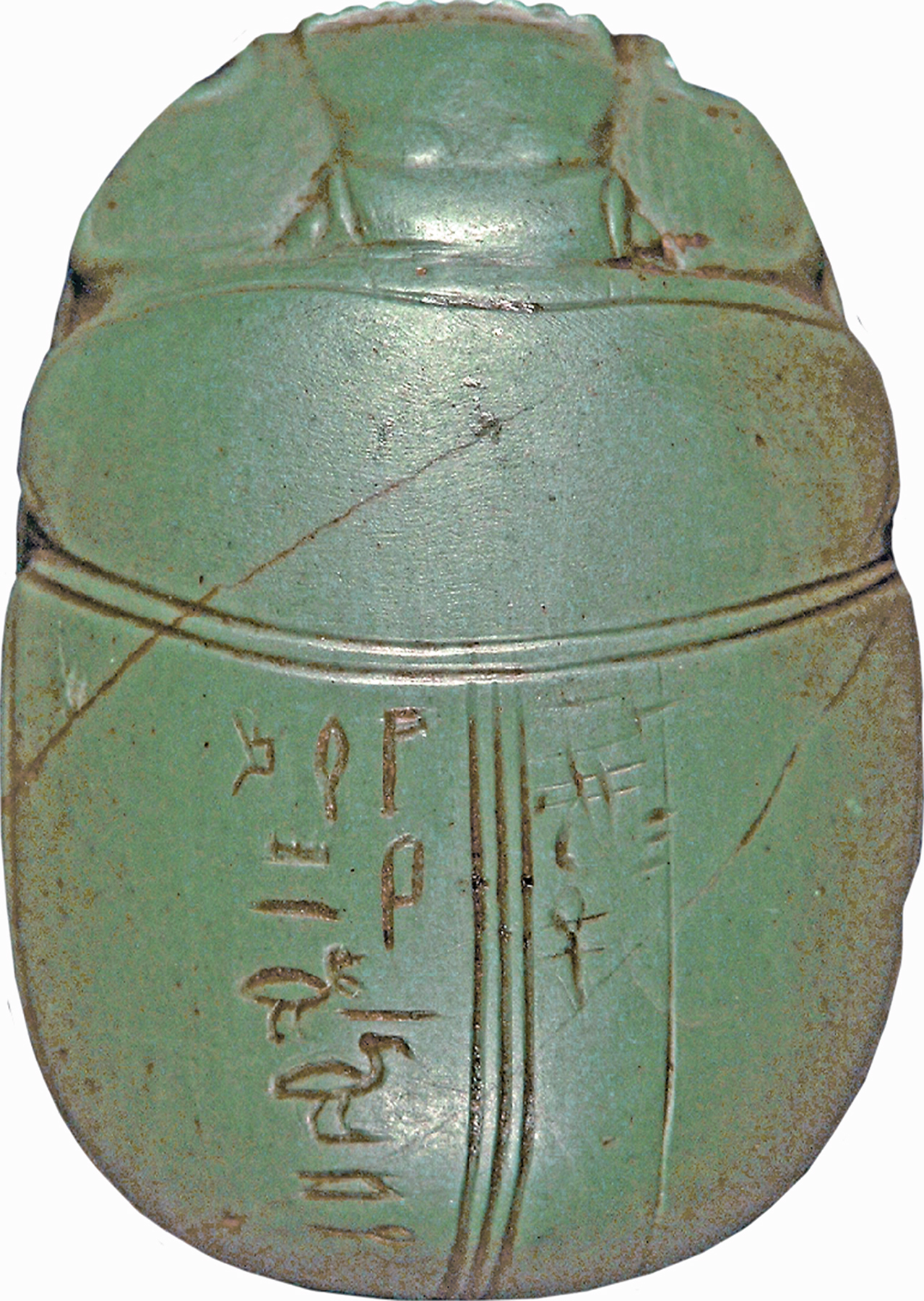
Heart Scarab of Bak-en-Djehuti, grey-green greywacke

== Dating and evolution ==
The first known depictions of heart scarabs are found in the Sixteenth Dynasty or Seventeenth Dynasty circa 1690 B.C., although it is known that the amulet was in use as early as the Eleventh Dynasty. Until the beginning of the Eighteenth Dynasty, the heart scarab had a strong connection to Theban royalty. The amulet then began appearing in the burials of other Egyptians. During the Twenty-first Dynasty, it stood as an important item of magical protection among the priesthood of Amun. After the Twenty-first Dynasty, the amulet is rarely depicted in human contexts and instead, is associated with specific divinities.

Heart scarabs went through significant modifications in their design over the course of history. During the New Kingdom, heart scarabs were large, typically between four and five centimeters long. By the Third Intermediate Period, a new variation emerged. This new scarab was much smaller, at about two to four centimeters long. Due to their smaller size, these heart scarabs were not engraved. Unlike other heart scarabs that were placed directly above a person's heart and wrapped into their bandages, these new variations of heart scarabs were placed inside the person's chest cavity, alongside their true heart. Heart scarabs were also used in the design of pectorals, which were a rectangular chest ornament.

== Gallery ==
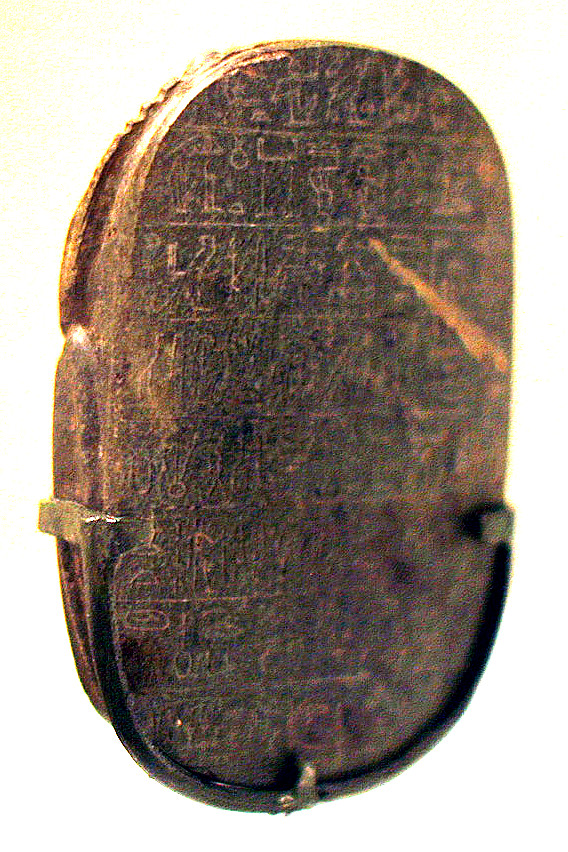
Heart Scarab, inscribed with Chapter 30, Book of the Dead

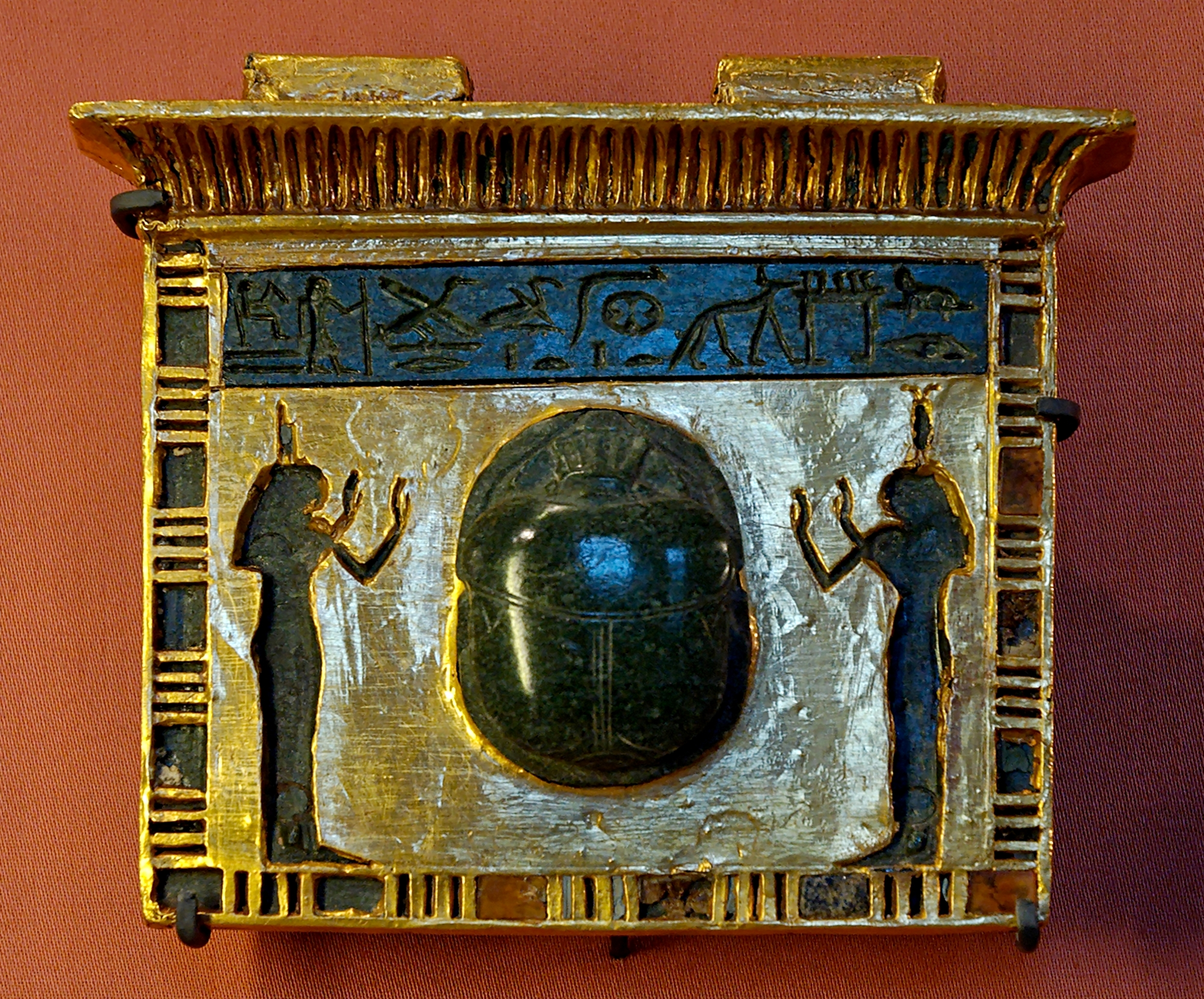
Paser pylon pendant, with heart scarab motif

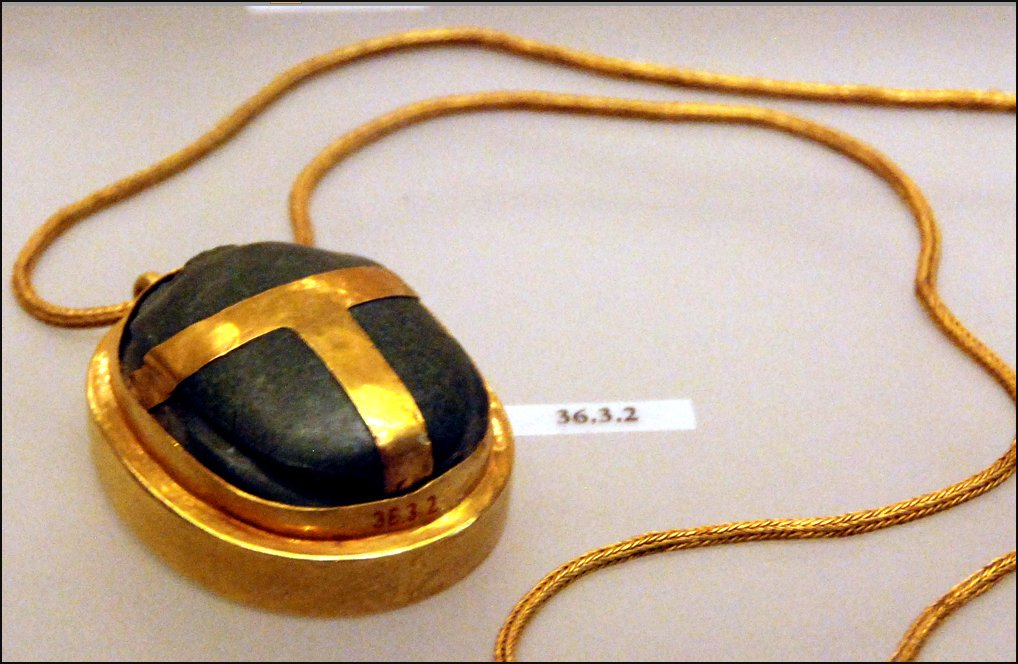
The Heart Scarab of Hatnefer, on display at the Metropolitan Museum of Art

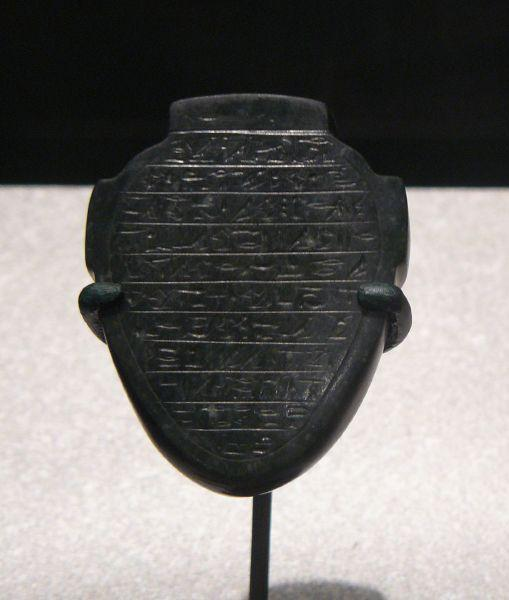
Heart Scarab of the Divine Father Hori

== See also ==
- Egyptian hieroglyphs
- Heart Scarab of Hatnefer
- List of ancient Egyptian statuary with amulet necklaces
- Papyrus stem amulet
- Scarab (artifact)
- Stair-single (hieroglyph)
