= Myriam Seco =

Spanish archaeologist and Egyptologist

- Born: Myriam Seco Álvarez; 28 June 1967 (age 59); Seville, Spain
- Education: University of Seville
- Occupations: Archaeologist, Egyptologist

Myriam Seco Álvarez (born 28 June 1967) is a Spanish archaeologist and Egyptologist. A distinguished authority in those fields, the author of several reference books, and responsible for excavations in the Middle East and Egypt, she has launched and directed important archaeological projects, including the excavation and restoration of the mortuary temple of Pharaoh Thutmose III (15th century BC). The so-called "Spanish Indiana Jones", she has had a prolific professional career and a broad international presence.

== Academic training ==
Myriam Seco earned a licentiate with a specialty in Ancient History from the University of Seville in 1990. She then continued her doctoral studies and completed a thesis entitled La familia en el Egipto Antiguo (The Family in Ancient Egypt). From 1992 to 1994 she worked at the Institute of Egyptology at the University of Tübingen, Germany, and in January 1995 she received her doctorate in history at the University of Seville with the thesis Representaciones de niños en las tumbas privadas de Tebas durante la XVIII dinastía en Egipto (Representations of Children in the Private Tombs of Thebes During the 18th Dynasty in Egypt). In 1998 she began her training in underwater archaeology with the Institute of Nautical Archaeology of Texas, at the Sadana Island site in the Red Sea.

== Research ==
Among Dr. Seco's first field works in Spain are those she conducted in 1995 at a Phoenician site in Cerro del Villar, Málaga with Dr. Aubet from the University of Barcelona, one she worked on in 1996 in Carratraca, Málaga with the University of Málaga, and one carried out in 1997 in Seville with Dr. Ramón Corzo of the University of Seville.

In 1996, she worked at a medieval archaeological site in the German town of Reutlingen with Dr. Barbara Scholkmann of the University of Tübingen.

In Egypt she has done extensive work over more than twenty years, including one of her first excavations there in 1996 at the site of Sharuna, with Dr. Farouk Gomaa of the University of Tübingen. This was followed by a 1998 excavation in the necropolis of the Second and Third Intermediate Period in the Heracleopolis Magna with Egyptologist Carmen Pérez Díe of the National Archaeological Museum of Madrid, archaeological campaigns from 2001 to 2004 at the Bent Pyramid, the mortuary temple of Sneferu, and temple of the valley in Dahshur with Dr. Rainer Stadelmann of the German Archaeological Institute, and various excavations at the temple of Amenhotep III in Luxor with Dr. Hourig Sourouzian.

Seco is also an underwater archaeologist. She became a professional diver to expand her knowledge and skills in archaeological research. Her first work in this capacity was in the Red Sea in 1998, during a submarine excavation of a sunken 18th-century ship with the Institute of Nautical Archaeology. In 2001, together with Mourad el-Amouri, she organized an archaeological survey in the Red Sea in the area between Wadi Gawasis and Marsa Alam. From 1998 to 2002 she worked at an underwater excavation in Alexandria at the Qaitbay (Pharos) site with Dr. Jean-Yves Empereur of the French Alexandria Studies Center (CEA). With this institution and also in Alexandria she participated in an underwater excavation of a wreck from the ancient Roman Empire.

The first major project she headed began in 2006 and was on the shores of Tyre, Lebanon, where she was in charge of a Spanish-Lebanese team. It was a Phoenician wreck with a shipment of terracotta statues that was being looted. This was a cooperative project between the Directorate-General of Lebanese Antiquities (DGA) and the Real Academia de Bellas Artes de Santa Isabel de Hungría of Seville. This research has been ongoing for several years and has brought to light important archaeological findings.

Another career highlight was participating in Mystery of the Nile, a documentary film in IMAX format, shot from November 2003 to July 2004, which reflects the experiences and field work of the first scientific expedition to travel from the source of the Blue Nile River to its mouth in the Mediterranean, a journey of more than 5,000 kilometers. On the expedition, Seco was mostly concerned with exploring the links between ancient civilizations in Ethiopia, Sudan, and Egypt.

She also worked as a coordinator on "120 Años de Arqueología Española en Egipto" (120 Years of Spanish Archaeology in Egypt), an exhibition that opened at the Egyptian Museum in April 2009. It was organized by the State Society of Cultural Commemorations, the Ministry of Culture's Directorate-General for Cultural Policies and Industries, the Instituto Cervantes in Cairo, and the Egyptian Ministry of Antiquities.

Today she directs an important archaeological project: the excavation, restoration, and enhancement of the mortuary temple of Thutmose III, called the Temple of Millions of Years of Thutmose III, in Luxor. This began in 2008 and is carried out with the Real Academia de Bellas Artes de Santa Isabel de Hungría, in collaboration with the Egyptian Ministry of Antiquities.

== Teaching ==
Myriam Seco has been the corresponding Academician of the Real Academia de Bellas Artes de Santa Isabel de Hungría since 2006. She has been a guest lecturer in the Master of Drawing program at the University of Granada's Faculty of Fine Arts since 2009. She is also a professor at the University of Murcia's Near East and Late Antiquity Study Center (CEPOAT), where she teaches master classes.

== Selected publications ==
=== Books ===
- Representaciones de niños en la tumbas tebanas durante la XVIII dinastía, KOLAIOS 6. Seville 1997. ISBN 8492239476.
- La colección egipcia de la Universidad Hispalense. Seville 2000. ISBN 8489777985.
- Los Templos de Millones de Años en Tebas, Granada 2015. (eds.) Myriam Seco Álvarez and Asunción Jódar Miñarro
- Tutankhamón en España: Howard Carter, el duque de Alba y las conferencias de Madrid 2017, Jose Manuel Lara Foundation. (eds.) Myriam Seco Álvarez and Javier Martínez Babón. ISBN 9788415673644.

=== Collective works ===
- "Three Seasons of Work at the Temple of Amenhotep III at Kom El Hettan: Part II". Annales du Service d'Antiquité Égyptienne 80, pp. 367–399.
- "Mission de recherches geo-archeologiques a Tyr (Liban). Annee 2002 Geomorphologie littorale et archeologie sous-marine", BAAL VII, pp. 91–110.

=== Articles ===
- "Representation de groupes familiaux à l'ancien empire", Egyptian Museum Collections around the World, Vol. I, Cairo 2002, pp. 26–30.
- "First Season of the Egyptian-Spanish project at the Funerary Temple of Thutmosis III in Luxor", Myriam Seco Álvarez and others, ASAE 84 (2010), pp. 1–35.
- "Second and Third Campaigns of the Egyptian-Spanish project at the Mortuary Temple of Thutmosis III in Luxor West Bank (2009 and 2010)", Myriam Seco Álvarez and others, ASAE 86 (2012), pp. 329–395.
- "The Temple of Millions of Years of Tuthmosis III", Egyptian Archaeology 44 (2013), pp. 21–25.
- "Foundation Deposit in the Temple of Millions of Years of Thutmose III in Luxor", Memnonia XXV (2014), M. Seco Álvarez and J. Martínez Babón, pp. 157–167.
- "Middle Kingdom tombs beneath the Temple of Millions of Years", EA 47 (2015) M. Seco Álvarez and J. Martínez Babón, pp. 27–30.

== Awards ==
- 2014 Marca España commemorative distinction as one of the members of the first edition of "100 Spaniards"
- Award for one of the ten best discoveries in Egypt during her 2016 campaign, granted by the magazine Luxor Times, for the colorful cartonnage of the "servant of the Royal House" found in the mortuary temple of Thutmose III
- 2017 Manuel Alvar Award for Humanistic Studies for the essay "Tutankhamón en España: Howard Carter, el duque de Alba y las conferencias de Madrid", a joint work by Myriam Seco Álvarez and Javier Martínez Babón
