= Mainake (Greek settlement) =

Ancient Greek settlement in the southeast of Spain

Coordinates: 36°44′01″N 4°07′11″W

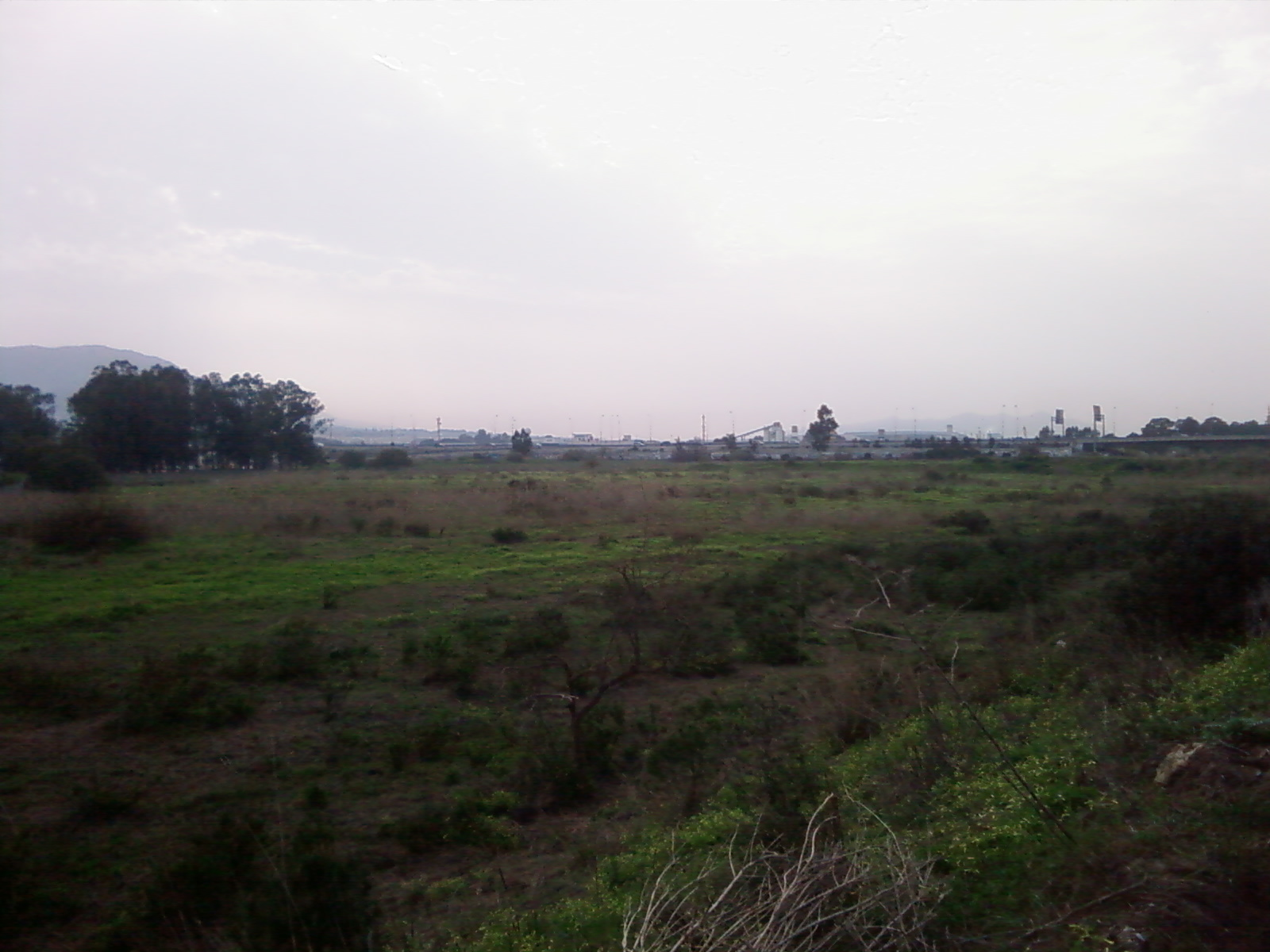
Archaeological site of Cerro del Villar

Mainake, Menace (Ancient Greek: Μαινάκη, Mainákē, [mai̯nákɛː]) was an ancient Greek settlement lying in the southeast of Spain, according to the Greek geographer and historian Strabo (3,4,2) and Pausanias of Damascus. Pausanias adds that it was a colony of the Greek city of Massalia. Maria Eugenia Aubet locates it at the site of modern Málaga. The first colonial settlement in the area, dating from the late 8th century BC, was made by seafaring Phoenicians from Tyre, Lebanon, on an islet in the estuary of the Guadalhorce River at Cerro del Villar (the coastline of Málaga has changed considerably since that time, as river silting and changes in river levels have filled the ancient estuary and moved the site inland).

The Phoenician settlements were more densely concentrated on the coastline east of Gibraltar than they were further up the coast. Market rivalry had attracted the Greeks to Iberia, who established their own trading colonies along the northeastern coast before venturing into the Phoenician corridor. They were encouraged by the Tartessians, who may have desired to end the Phoenician economic monopoly. Herodotus mentions that around 630 BC, the Phocaeans established relations with King Arganthonios (670–550 BC) of Tartessos, who gave them money to build walls around their city. Later they founded Mainake on the Málaga coast (Strabo. 3.4.2).

Recent archaeological investigations have reopened the debate about the location of the Greek Mainake. The Massaliote Periplus places the city under Tartessian dominion on an island with a good harbour; its author emphasises that the city was on an island close to the river of the same name, and surrounded by saltwater lagoons. Geomorphological and paleo-environmental studies have shown that the Phoenician colony of Cerro del Villar, at the mouth of the Guadalhorce, was situated on an ancient island, now a rise in an alluvial flood plain west of Málaga.

The Periplus, a merchants' guidebook which described the sea routes used by traders from Phoenicia and Tartessos, possibly dating to as early as the 6th century BC, contains the most ancient identification of Malaca as Mainake. It gives an account of a sea voyage circa 525 BC from Massalia (Marseille) along the western Mediterranean coast. The part referring to the Iberian Peninsula is preserved in the Ora Maritima (The Maritime Shores) of the Latin writer Rufus Festus Avienius, who wrote down excerpts much later, during the 4th century. Lines 425–431, which come after a description of the Pillars of Herakles (The Straits of Gibraltar), say that Mainake is close to the island of Noctiluca:

hos propter autem mox iugum Barbetium est

Malachaeque flumen urbe cum cognomine Menace priore quae vocata est saeculo. Tartessiorum iuris illic insula antistat urbem, Noctilucae ab incolis sacrata pridem. in insula stagnum quoque

tutusque portus. oppidum Menace super.

In English:

Near them [the Tartessians] is Cape Barbetium and the river Malacha with the town of the same name, formerly called Menace, under Tartessian dominion. In front of the town lies an island formerly dedicated by the inhabitants to Noctiluca. On the island is a marsh and a safe harbour; the town of Menace is above.

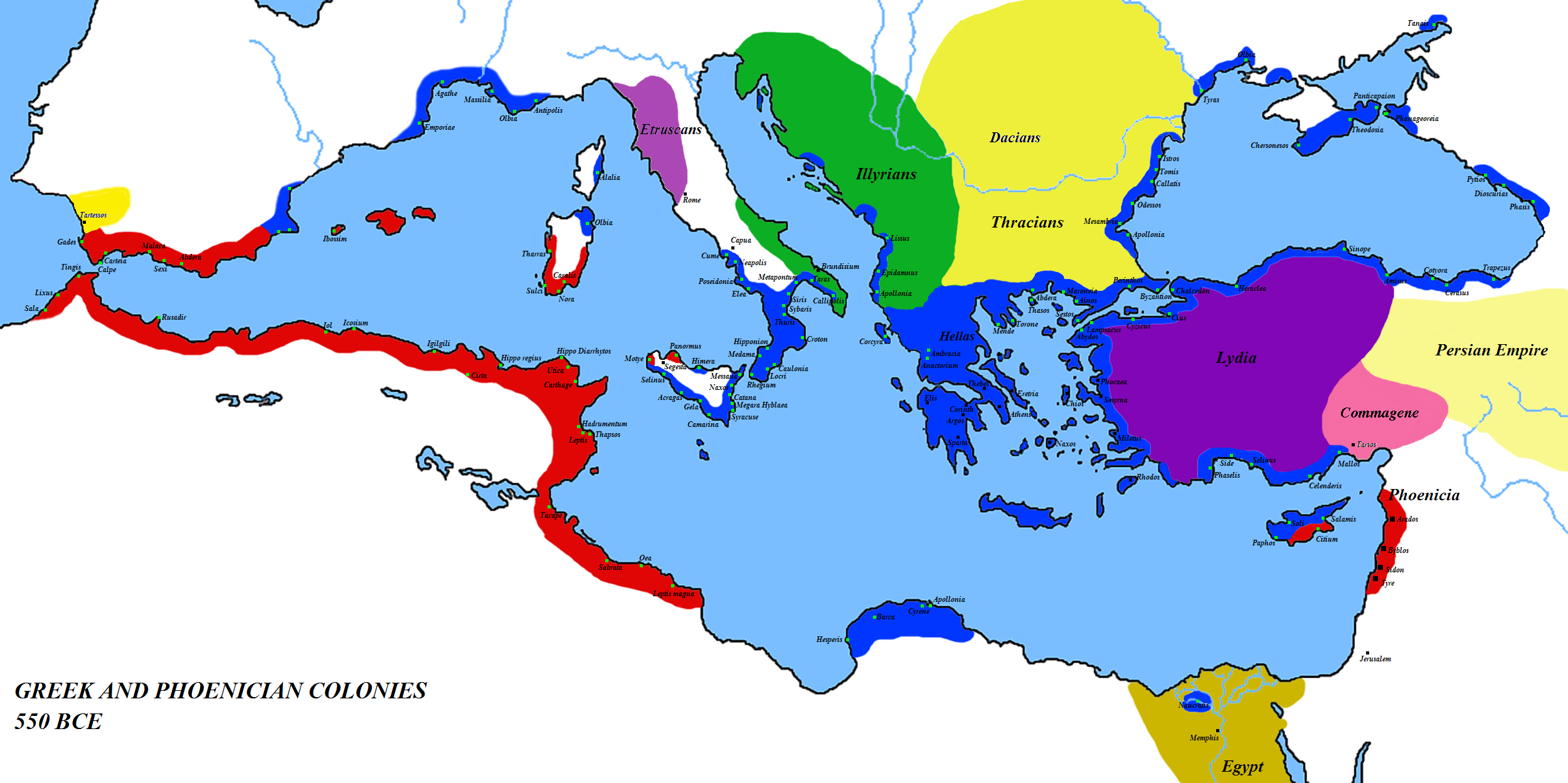
Greek and Phoenician colonies about 550 BC

The mythical Greek colony of Mainake existed for at least two centuries. The name appears to be derived from the Ancient Greek: μαίνη (maínē). There are several ancient documents that mention its existence and discuss its intensive commercial activity. Strabo and other ancient historians placed it east of Malaka, but recent archaeological investigations suggest that the site of the 8th century BC Phoenician settlement at Cerro del Villar, less than 5 kilometres (3 miles) west of the original site of Malaka, corresponds to the location of the Greek colony. According to the ancient sources it was gradually abandoned after the battle of Alalia and the consequent collapse of the Phocaean Greek trade, which led the native inhabitants to shift their residence to the Phoenician-Punic Malaka.

The Greek historian and geographer Strabo (64 BC–24 AD) says in his Geographica that in his time some thought this colony was the city of Malaca, a supposition he contradicted by pointing out that the ruins of Mainake could still be seen near Malaca and showed the regular urban plan of the Greeks, versus the haphazard Semitic layout of Malaka:

The first city on this coastline is Malaca, which is as far distant from Calpe as Gades is. It is a market for the nomad tribes from the opposite coast, and it also has great establishments for salting fish. Some suppose it to be the same as Maenaca, which tradition reports to be the farthest west of the Phocaean cities; but this is not true. On the contrary, the city of Maenaca is farther away from Calpe, and is now in ruins, though it still preserves traces of having been a Grecian city, whereas Malaca is nearer, and Phoenician in its configuration. [Calpe is an ancient name for Gibraltar].

The layout of ancient Malaka is unknown, but its location on a hill at the foot of Mount Gibralfaro suggests it was a more dense and irregular urban cluster than neighbouring Cerro del Villar, that is, Mainake. Traces of ancient landings there, as of a port, correspond with the description in the Periplous. The ruins mentioned by Strabo were still visible in the 1st century BC, and could only belong to a place that was already vacated in the Roman period, as occurred in Cerro del Villar but not in Malaka. The Phoenician city at Cerro del Villar lay in ruins at the beginning of the 6th century BC, when it was apparently resettled by the Phocaean Greeks.

According to the Barrington Atlas of the Greek and Roman World, its probable location is the hill of Cerro del Peñón, near the mouth of river Vélez, at the south of Vélez Malaga.
