= Sekhmet statues =

Statues of Egyptian goddess

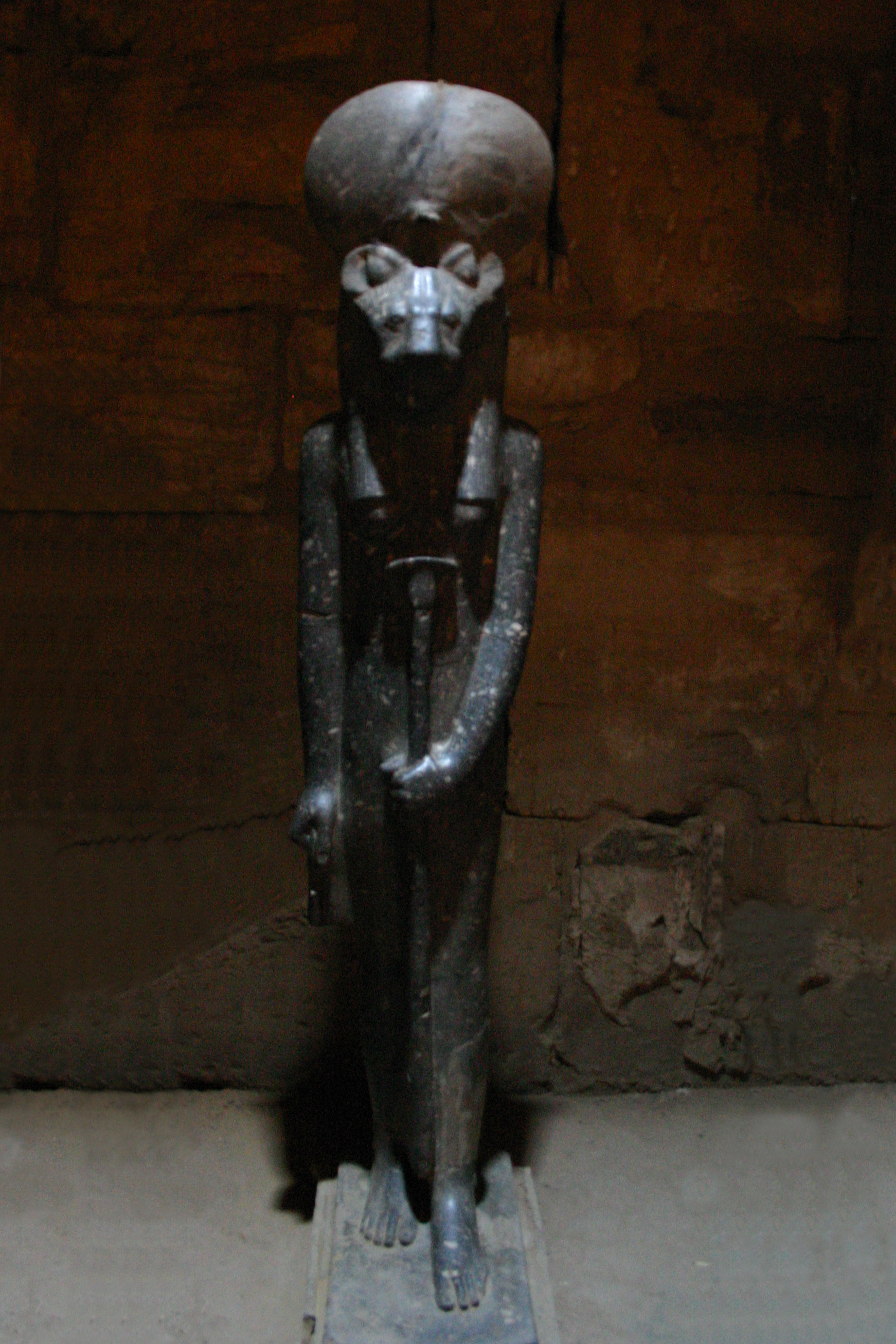

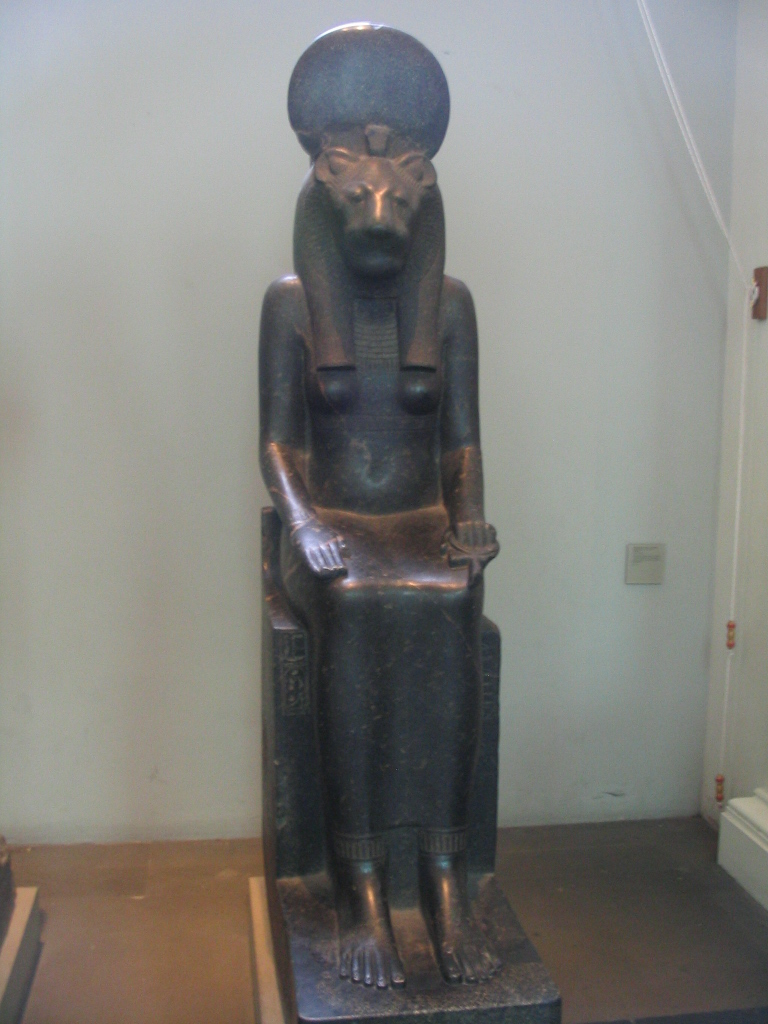

The Sekhmet statues, dating back to the New Kingdom of Egypt during the 18th dynasty and later dynasties, are statues of the Egyptian goddess Sekhmet.

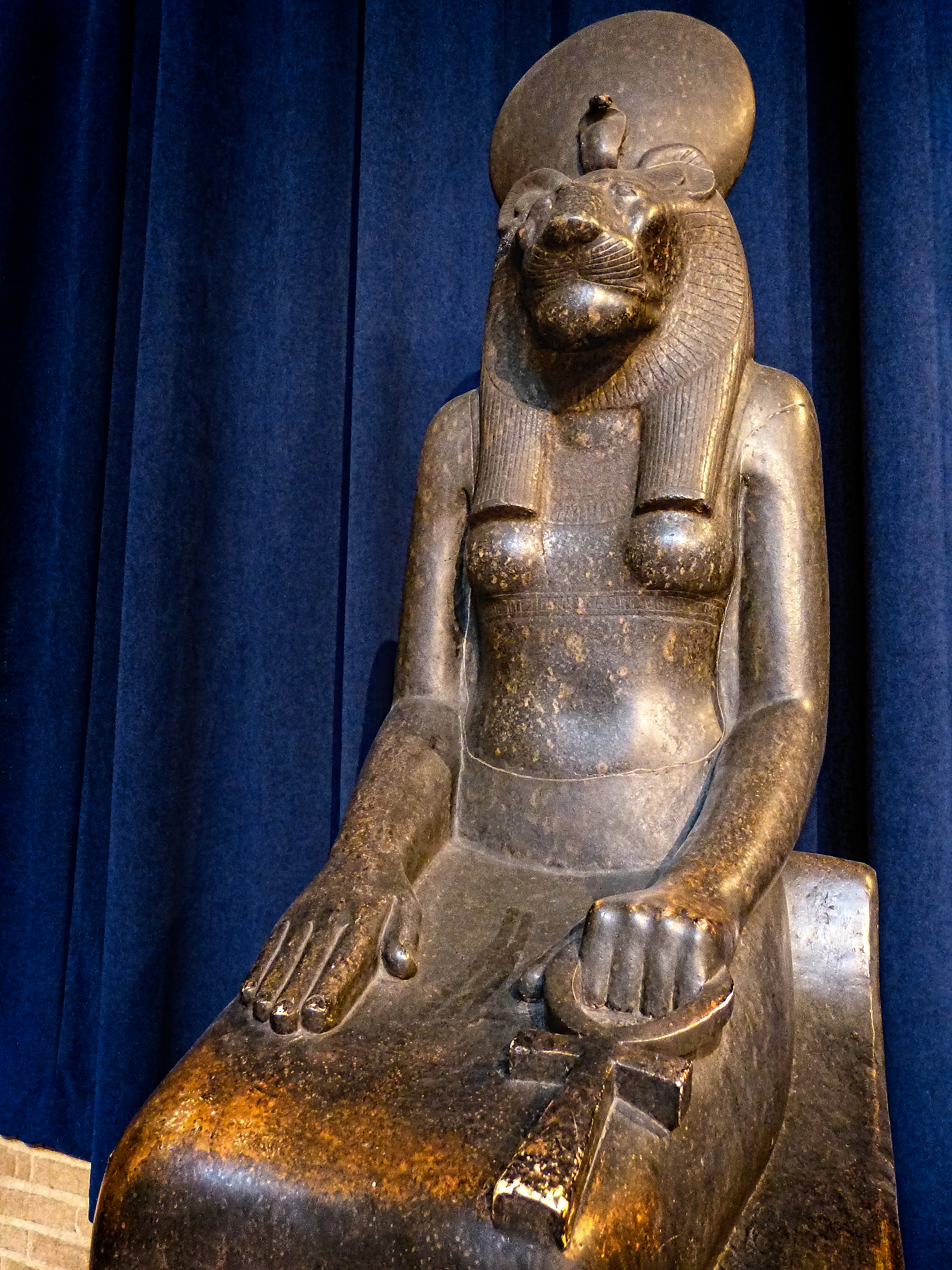
University of Pennsylvania Museum displayed black granite statue of Goddess Sekhmet excavated in Thebes in Ramesseum 1405-1367 BCE (Late 18th_Dynasty)

Sekhmet statues can be found throughout Egypt, Thebes, Karnak and other parts of Africa. They are found throughout Egypt due to rulers moving them from their original location. Sekhmet statues give us information of the Sekhmet goddess, Egyptian art, kings, religion, and culture of Egypt.

== Depiction of the goddess Sekhmet ==
The statues are a depiction of the goddess Sekhmet showing her lioness features from head to toe. The statues feature the fierce eye of the sun god Re and its jaw structure the goddess is known for. The goddess has violent characteristics that can cause destruction and illness. Sekhmet's name means "who is powerful". The follower must please the Sekhmet goddess by praying and giving offerings to her Sekhmet statue. If done correctly the Sekhmet would bring peace and help when sick or at war.

== Origin ==
The origin of the Sekhmet statues was during the reign of Amenhotep III dynasty 18 (ca 1390-1352 BC). There have been more than six hundred statues that have been recovered from Egypt. Most of these Sekhmet statues were created under Amenhotep III. Sekhmet statues have been found at Amenhotep III Mortuary Temple/Complex at Kom el Heittan on the Theban West Bank and at the Temple of Mut at Karnak on the east bank of the Nile River at Thebes. Sekhmet statues can still be found and traced back to Amenhotep III. The Sekhmet statues are a part of his massive statuary program.

Amenhotep III hoped that the Sekhmet statues would heal him from illness and bring him good fortune for the year. This is why there were so many Sekhmet statues being built and at such a fast pace. We can tell Amenhotep III favored the Sekhmet goddess since he used her statues so much for ritual practices. Many scholars believe that there were a total of 730 statues built which is two statues for every day of the year.

== Influence ==
- The Sekhmet statues play a huge role religiously because they were used during Amenhotep III reign to cure him from illness. He created 730 statues in total for everyday of the year to bring good fortune. Many priests would present the statue with offerings and prayers to appease the goddess Sekhmet through the statue.
- The Sekhmet statue was used to bring balance between the Goddess Mut peace and the Goddess Sekhmet's fierceness. Sekhmet statue is the aggressive representation of Mut.
- Sekhmet statue was prayed to and offered by priests to make sure the town wouldn't get destroyed or bring famine. Yoyotte lists offerings to the Sekhmet statue such as geese, antelopes, beer, wine and sistra.
- The Sekhmet statue was also a celestial map that was used during the jubilee festivals and sed festivals. Tiny lute dancers would dance to the Sekhmet statue in festivals to appease the goddess.
- Sekhmet statue is involved in a family triad with Ptah and are unified by their child Ramesses II which is mythologically the god of Nefertem. The statue can be found in the Egyptian Museum in Cairo. Together they are seen as a family triad. This family triad shows how many divinities were worshipped together at Memphis in the 19th dynasty. The statues purpose was meant to protect and heal.
- The Sekhmet statues have the eye of the sun god Re. The statue is supposed to depict her fierceness and strength. To kings the statue was military patroness and a symbol of power in battle since the goddess was the smiter of the Nubians.
- Amulets of Sekhmet were like mini statues for people for the new year.
- The Sekhmet statue has many epithets that show her as beloved to the king as well as describe her as a Goddess.
- The Sekhmet statue helps give Egyptologists a time period, Egyptian culture and Egyptian art.

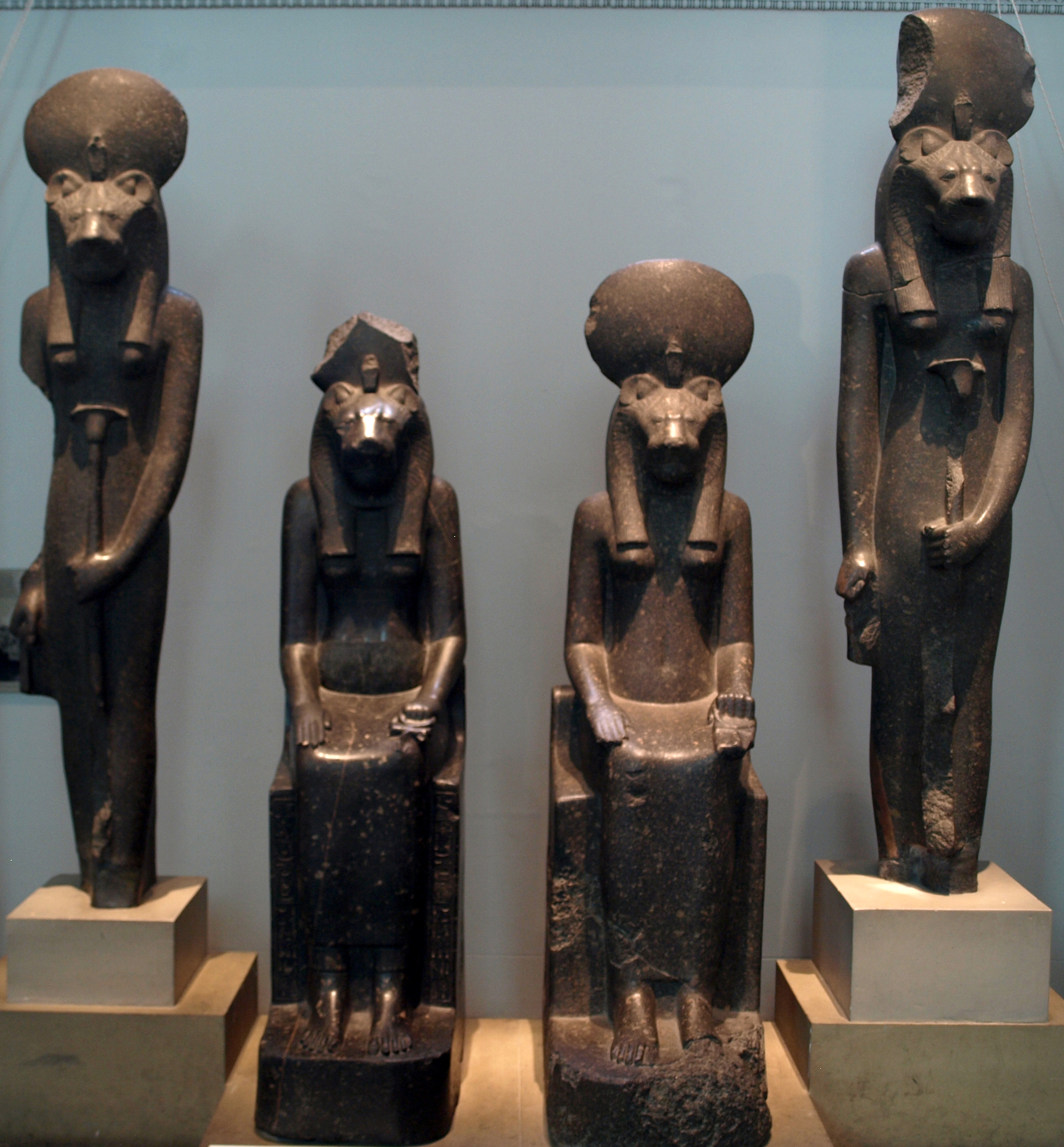

== Description ==
There are two types of Sekhmet statues. There are some standing statues and there are some seated statues. Sekhmet statues are made of black grandiorite with different types of stones. Since there are over 57 types of grandiorite found in the statues this opens new perspectives of the workshops and of how the statues were made. The statues may have not all been made by the same sculptor since they vary in size. The statues consist of litany stone that is used to help appease the goddess.

Sekhmet statues measurements vary depending if you're looking at a standing or seated statue that is complete. Average measurements of a Sekhmet statue are a height of 210 cm (82 11/16 in.), width of base 47.5 cm (18 11/16 in.) and d 95.5 cm (375/8 in.). The statues can be twice the height of someone or taller and can weigh two tons.

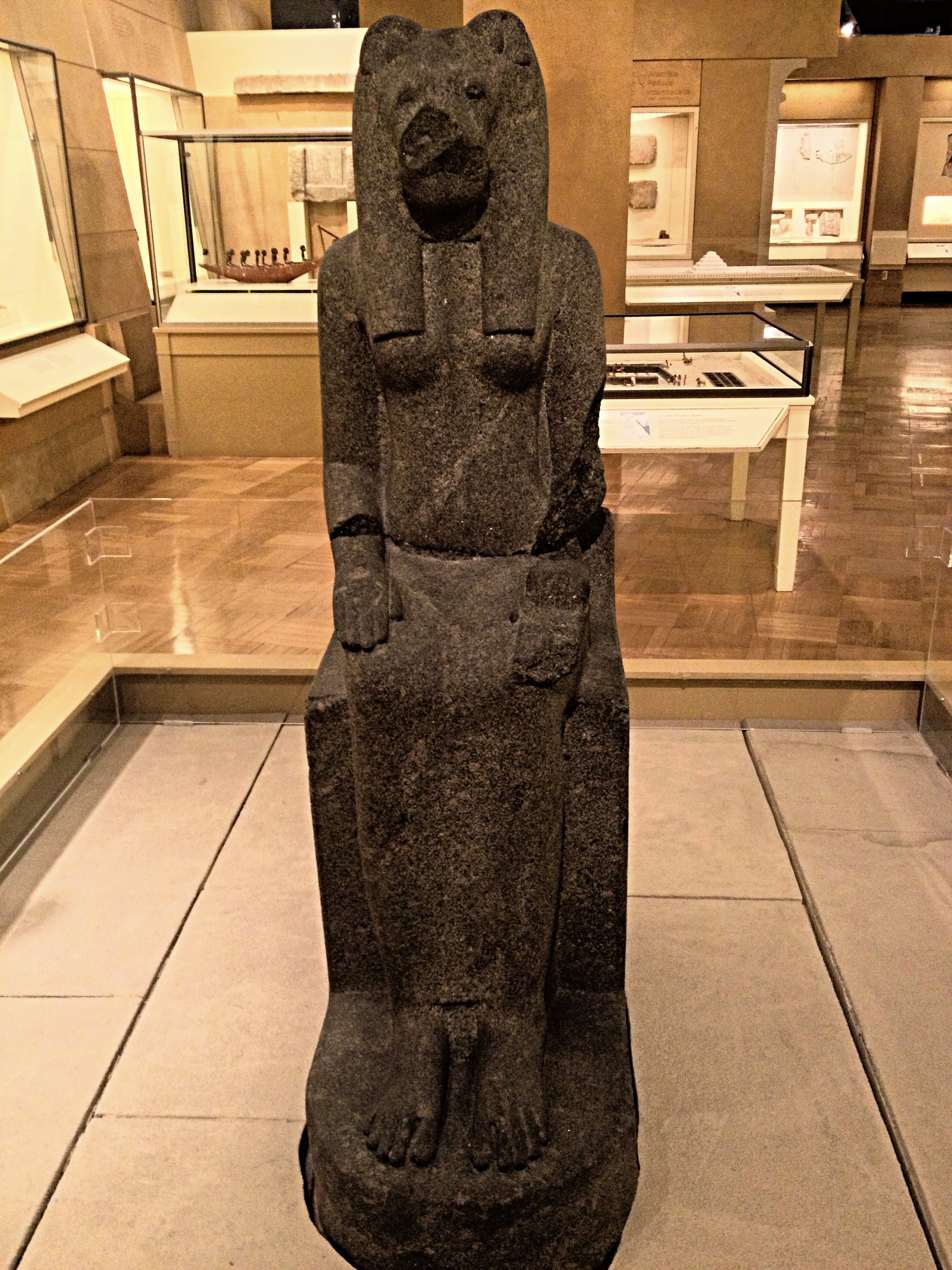
The Statue of Sekhmet at the Royal Ontario Museum does not have a sun disk.

The statues leave people in awe with their fiery eye of Re and jaw structure of the goddess Sekhmet. The statue is a zoomorphic form of a lioness. Egyptian artists were great at putting human and animal forms together in equal power and truth. The head of the statues have a sun disk and Uraeus on the top which is connected by a dove tail groove. The sun disk would've been placed in the back pillar. There are rare depictions of the statue wearing a double crown representing the fusion of Sekhmet and Mut. The statues are made in pieces and we know that from the fragments and unfinished statues. The statue wears a tight fitting gown/garment and the bodice rises up to the breasts. The upper body is nude. There is a broad collar on the shoulders and it is visible between the dress straps. The aegis is represented in the metal collar. The gown is tight all the way down to the legs below the hem and it's wide. The dress is meant to be the color red and would represent mistress aspect and symbolize lower Egypt and warlike nature. Sekhmet statues have accessories like ankle bands and bracelets. The dress is conservative for the time period. There is a daisy over each breast. This daisy can be seen on Queen Tia, Queen Tiy and on the private people of Amenhotep III. The large rosette over the greats are meant to reflect patterns in the shoulder hair of lions and another theory is that they reflect astronomical symbolism of the shoulder star of the constellation Leo in Egyptian astronomical paintings.

Sekhmet statues wear a wig arranged in separate strands like real hair. The wig falls down to the breasts. The Sekhmet statues show the anatomy of the Sekhmet. They have a low rolling back. The ruff on the lions face from the statue is female and is different from the ruff of a male. There are detailed carved whiskers, furrows, hair tiffs and elaborate ankh signs. On the standing statues the whiskers and papyrus scepter are more detailed. The standing Sekhmet statues all hold a papyrus scepter in the left hand and the ankh sign which is the symbol of life in the right hand. The papyrus the statue holds is a symbol of her native lower Egypt and is meant to unite upper and lower Egypt. The seated statues all hold the ankh sign on the left hand and their right hand flat on the thigh. The seated statues feet are always together. The standing statues should have an inscribed base but is sometimes found missing. The seated statues all are on Royal thrones similar to what kings would use. The kings name is on the front of the throne and is dedicated to Sekhmet. The thrones are ornamented on the sides of the seated statues. The statues throne include hieroglyphics and a regulated border pattern and lower corner of the rectangle design. The thrones are inscribed with the names of past kings not just Amenhotep III but of Ramsess II, Pinudjem II, Sheshonk I that are from later dynasties and was a convenient quarry for them. The inscriptions on the statues let us know from what period they're from. They also tell us about Sekhmet and the king.

== Epithets ==
Epithets are inscriptions on the throne of statues. They show characteristics of kings, gods/goddesses. There are many epithets found on the Sekhmet statues, for example:

- "The good god lord of the cult act, Nebmaatre, beloved of Sekhmet, given life forever."
- "The son of Re Amenhotep, ruler of Thebes beloved of Sekhmet, the great, mistress of the sky, forever."
- "The king of upper and lower Egypt, lord of appearances Nebmaatre, beloved of Amun, king of the god, forever, the son of Re of his body Amenhotep ruler of ruler of Thebes, beloved of Amun Re, lord of the thrones of the two lands forever."

These types of epithets show the Sekhmet statues connection to Jubilees, sed festivals and calendar aspects. Sekhmet's nature is shown from the epithets on the statue as fierce and powerful. She's depicted on the statues as a mistress and smiter of the Nubians. There are so many epithets found from the Sekhmet statues that tell us about the kings of Egypt, Sekhmet and the culture. The epithets on the thrones are single perpendicular lines down either side of the front seat. There are prenomens and nomens of the king.

== Theories ==
Some Egyptologists question if all statues came from Amenhotep III mortuary temple because the saite proportion standing of the statues. Some of the statues have a uniform matte finish which can mean they're from different times or from different workshops. Some say the finest works are from Amenhotep III because of the detailed filled dots for the whiskers and talon shaped hooks beneath the inside corner of each eye on the Sekhmet statue. Yoyette links Amenhotep III Sekhmet statues epithets to various recessions of late Sekhmet litanies from the edfu dendera Kom ombo and Tod. Litany was used to help the goddess from destruction. Sekhmet has been around long and can be connected to Hathor, Bastet for good fortune. Yoyette, Germond, Betsy believes the statues were designed for festival rituals.

== Location/excavations ==
The statues can be found throughout the temple of Mut and the mortuary temple of Amenhotep III. Many excavators have documented their finds. From excavations, Egyptologists have come across both completed, destroyed and fragments of the statues. In 1915 the Met Museum received a Sekhmet statue as a gift of Henry Walters and that particular statue can be traced to the Amenhotep III mortuary temple. The statues at the Met Museum were found at the latter site of Amenhotep III. At the temple of Amenhotep III the statues were set in lavish fashion in double rows, one behind the other. The statues looked as if they were ready for battle. Sekhmet statues at Kom el Heittan can be found at the courts aligned with other divine statues. The statues would form a celestial map that would be the kings eternal ritual calendar. This would explain why there were so many statues built.

The statues at Amenhotep III's temple wasn't a good place for them topography wise because they were put in an area that suffered from rising ground water and would destroy the statues. For that reason the statues were moved to other sites like the temple of Mut. Sekhmet statues found at the temple of Mut on the east bank at Luxor were the same ones used in Amenhotep III courts. The Sekhmet goddess and goddess Mut are linked together. Mut is the wife of Amun and was worshipped at the Mut Precinct. The Sekhmet statues had begun to be moved to the temple of Mut by the 19th dynasty. The statues were identified together and give religious influence. The two statues religious influence were meant to balance each other with fierce and gentle attributes and avoid destruction.

The British Museum has the largest collection of Sekhmet statues outside of Egypt. Many of the statues can still be found at their original sites. The statues were positioned near the sacred lake in the temple of Mut. Other areas where rituals that involve Sekhmet are by similar kidney shaped lakes. Many felt the number of statues found is unusual, but when looking at the evidence they were used as a calendar and for sed festivals. The statues were used in rituals to please the goddess. Sekhmet statues at Mut at Karnak on the east bank at Luxor were from Amenhotep III courts. The statues can be traced back through the epithets found on the statues.

Albert's excavations in 1831 found the Sekhmet statues at the mortuary temple in Thebes. Albert discusses how well the statues were put into rows at the Amenhotep III mortuary temple. Marriette describes the Sekhmet statues in the temple of Mut in double rows and are on the north east, west sides of the first court and some were in a single row along the south side at the court. At four sides of the second court behind the square Piers of a colonnade on the north east and west sides of the court, south side along the main wall depressing this second court from hypostyle. The statues are at Mut in rows in the north side of the first court looking north west. They're on the north side of 2nd court look northwest and are on the foreground south side of the 2nd court. They can be seen in the western corridor from the north Belonzi and at Karnak. Egyptologists like Betsy Bryan have connected the statues to the new year and jubilee festivals of Amenhotep III. Egyptologists use Decans that of southern heavens that link to Sekhmet. Decans are time keepers and help the king in appeasement. Decans are found on the sides of the Sekhmet statues. Sekhmet statues are connected with jubilee festivals through hymns. 730 Sekhmet statues are on the Kom ombo hymn and speaks of the statue as "she whom his majesty follows in the number of 730 lady of years, so reigned of months and of days argues large numbers of statues".

Using hymns, epithets and seeing how the statues were placed egyptologist believe Sekhmet statues make a sky map for the jubilee. Sourouzian gives great chronology from excavations she's been a part of at the temple of Amenhotep. He shows how different stones were implemented into the statues. Betsy Bryan and her team at Mout in 2004 wanted to bring back the statues to Kom el Heittan. There were many opinions of how many statues there were at the temple of Mut and at Amenhotep III mortuary temple. Yoyette said 730 Sekhmet statues and Marriette guessed 572 Sekhmet statues. Benson and Gourlay believed Mut had 500 statues.

Sourouzian found many statues at Amenhotep III temple, temple of Amun at Karnak and on the Montu temple precinct at Karnak north. During the 20th century H Swiss institute uncovered Sekhmet statues from Kom el Heittan. Bases of the Sekhmet statues were stored in Medinet Habu. No 1999/2000 statues were found at the peristyle court and second pylons. In 2003 six statues were found at the hypostyle square. In 2005 five statues found at peristyle north and east portico. In Spring of 2005 statues were found on the east portico and on the west trench. In 2006 after removing the water blocking the excavations there were more statues found at the peristyle court and hypostyle hall. Usually feet and bases are missing from the statues. The Sekhmet statue is found at the sanctuary at Abusir from the Graeco Roman period. The Sekhmet statues led to further cult centers at Kom el Hisn in the western delta with Hathor. The statue at the Temple of Ptah at Karnak was broken in the 20th century since the locals feared she might harm their kids. Museums will set up the statues in a similar fashion in the same way that they were placed at the Temple of Mut.

== Bibliography ==
1. "Black Granite Statues of Sekhmet". British Museum.org. Trustees of the British Museum photo. Accessed January 31, 2016.
2. Bryan, Betsy M. 1997. "The statue program for the mortuary temple of Amenhotep III". In: Quirke, Stephen (ed.), The temple in ancient Egypt: new discoveries and recent research, 57-81. London: British Museum Press.
3. Kozloff, Arielle P. and Betsy M. Bryan, Egypt's Dazzling Sun. Amenhotep III and his World. With Lawrence M. Berman and an essay by Elisabeth Delange, Cleveland, Published by The Cleveland Museum of Art in cooperation with Indiana University Press, 1992.
4. Lythgoe, Albert M. “Statues of the Goddess Sekhmet”. The Metropolitan Museum of Art Bulletin. October 1, 1919. Accessed January 31, 2016. https://archive.org/details/jstor-3253827
5. "Statue of the Goddess Sakhmet". The Metropolitan Museum of Art. 2000-2015. Accessed January 31, 2016.
6. Sourouzian, Hourig, Rainer Stadelmann, Myriam Seco Álvarez, Josef Dorner, Nairy Hampikian, and Ibrahim Noureddine 2007. "The temple of Amenhotep III at Thebes: excavations and conservation at Kom el-Hettân. Fourth report on the sixth, seventh and eighth season in 2004, 2004-2005 and 2006. Mitteilungen des Deutschen Archäologischen Instituts, Abteilung Kairo",63, 247-335.
7. Wilkinson, Richard H. The Complete Gods and Goddesses of Ancient Egypt. Publisher Thames & Hudson; 1st edition (May 26, 2003).
