= Colossal red granite statue of Amenhotep III =

Granite head of the 18th Dynasty ancient Egyptian Pharaoh Amenhotep III

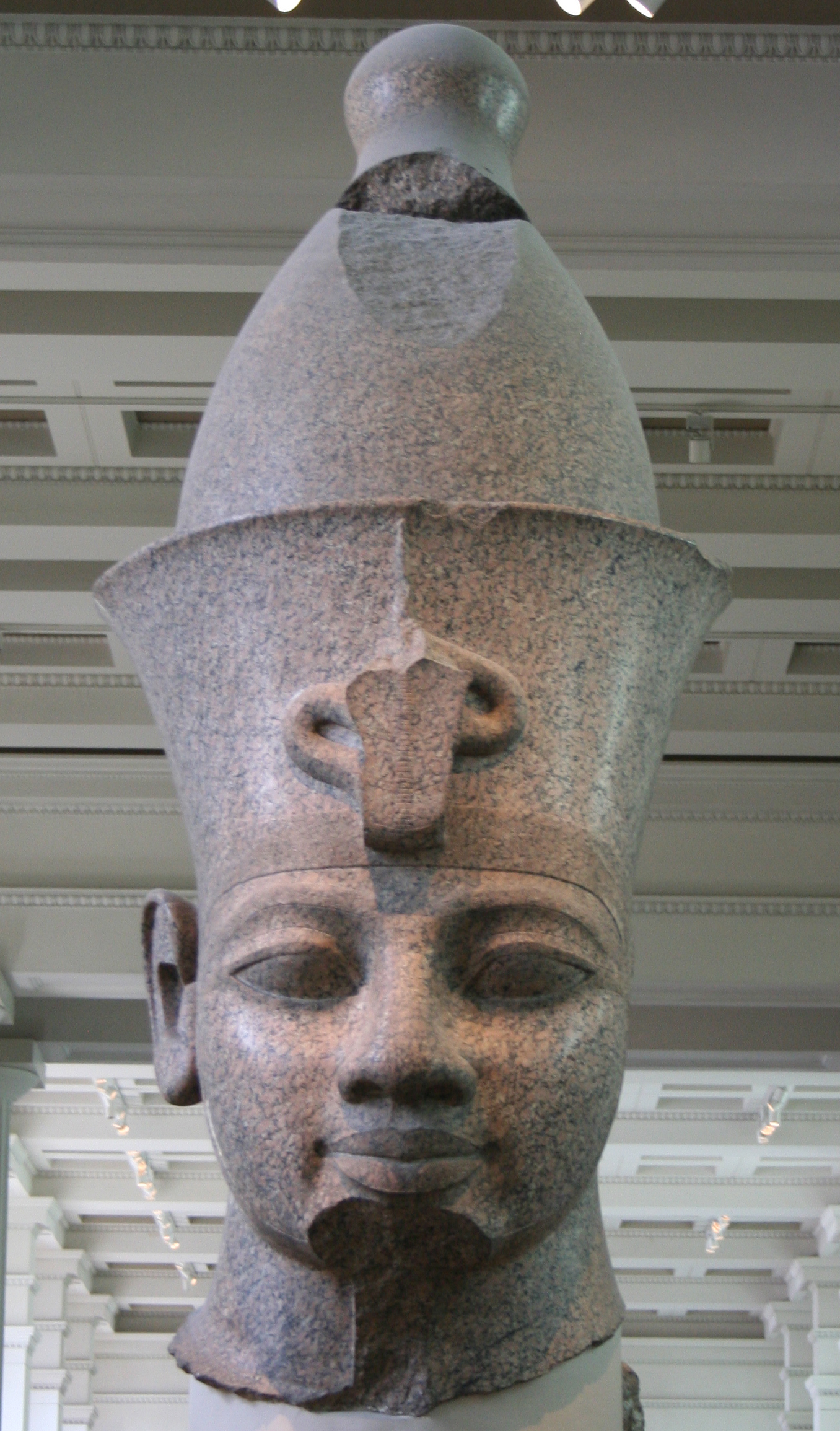
- Material: Granite
- Height: Head: 2.9 meters
- Created: c. 1370 BC
- Discovered: 1817; Luxor, Egypt
- Discovered by: Giovanni Belzoni and Henry Beechey
- Present location: British Museum, England, United Kingdom

The Colossal red granite statue of Amenhotep III is a granite head of the 18th Dynasty ancient Egyptian Pharaoh Amenhotep III. Created around 1370 BC, it was found in the temple enclosure of Mut at Karnak in Upper Egypt. Two parts of the broken colossal statue are known: the head and an arm. Both parts are now in the British Museum.

The statue is made of red granite. It is fragmentary: only the head and an arm are known to have survived.

== History ==
The statue is thought to have been erected by King Amenhotep III, one of the huge number of statues that he had ordered to be built in ancient Thebes (Luxor).

It is uncertain whether it was originally erected at its findspot at the Temple of Mut in Karnak, or if it came to be there having been removed in antiquity from Amenhotep III's mortuary temple on the West Bank of the Nile River at Kom el-Hitan. Other colossal statues of Amenhotep III include the two Colossi of Memnon, which still stand at his mortuary temple at Kom el-Hitan.

After its discovery, the statue was originally ascribed by scholars as a statue of King Thutmose III. The confusion has arisen from modification of the head by later rulers; it was common practice in Ancient Egypt for pharaohs to usurp statues of earlier rulers, modifying and re-inscribing them. The lips have had their corners drilled to suggest a smaller mouth, and the heavy cosmetic lines around the eyes, suggestive of the style of cosmetic fashion in Amenhotep III's time, have been largely erased. It is now thought that the alterations were made in the time of and to represent Ramesses II.

== Discovery ==
The broken statue was discovered in the temple enclosure of Mut at Karnak by Giovanni Belzoni and Henry Beechey in 1817. The head was found in front of the temple of Khonsupakhered. After being uncovered, the head needed to be moved to Luxor on the Nile River for transport upriver to Alexandria and then to London. Moving the head was not easy: it took eight days to transport it the single mile (1.6 km) to Luxor. Belzoni does not mention the exact location where the arm was found, though it is assumed to have been found with the head.

The head was stored for a period in the house of a Signor Rossi in Cairo:

One evening, Salt took him [a Captain FitzClarence] to call on Signor Rossi, where he had deposited some interesting items brought from the neighbourhood of Thebes, including a head of "Orus", "10 feet from the top of the mitre to the chin, having a band at the bottom part of it not unlike a turban ... made of red granite ... and in a very fine state of preservation ... an arm 18 feet long of the same statue with the fist clenched."

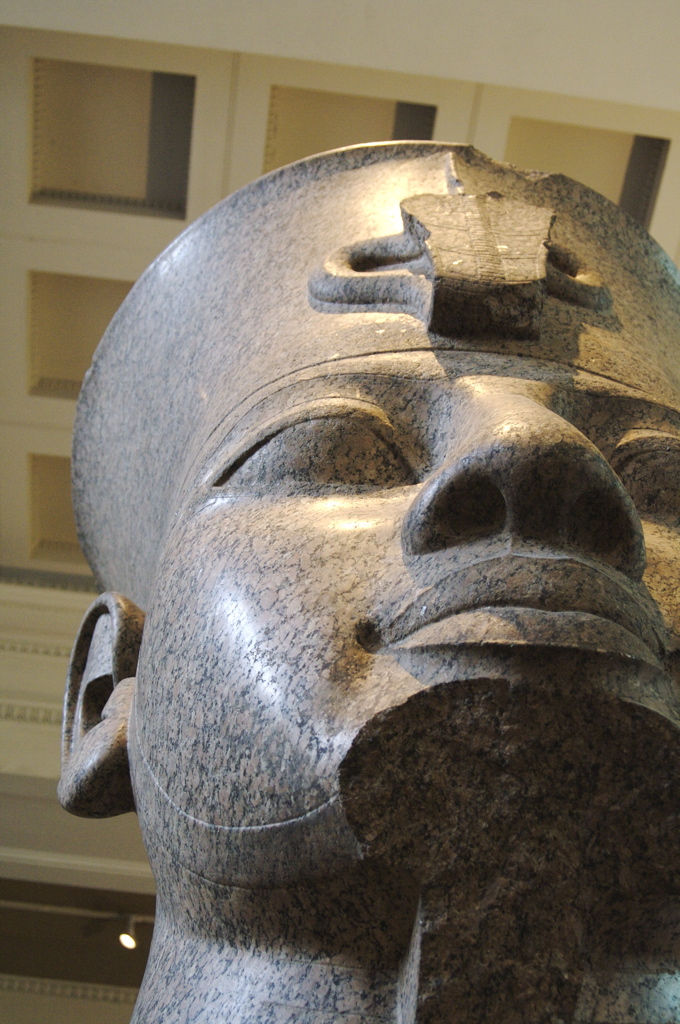
The statue from below

== The head ==
The head is 2.9 meters high, and is depicted wearing the pschent, the double crown of Upper and Lower Egypt. The British Museum has been in possession of the head since acquiring it from Henry Salt in 1823. It has the reference number EA 15 and is displayed in Room 4 of the Museum.

== The arm ==
The arm, a left arm, is 3.3 meters long and terminates in a clenched fist. The British Museum has been in possession of the arm since acquiring it from Henry Salt in 1823. It has the reference number EA 55 and is displayed in Room 4 of the Museum.

== Reading ==
- T.G.H. James and W.V. Davies, Egyptian sculpture (London, The British Museum Press, 1983)
- A.P. Kozloff and B.M. Bryan, Egypts dazzling sun: Amenhotep (Cleveland Museum of Art, 1992)
- Deborah Manley and Peta Rée, Henry Henry Salt: artist, traveller, diplomat, Egyptologist London: Libri, 2001)
- Strudwick, Nigel, Masterpieces of Ancient Egypt, London: British Museum Publications, 2006 p160-1
