= Statue of Sekhmet =

Ancient Egyptian statue

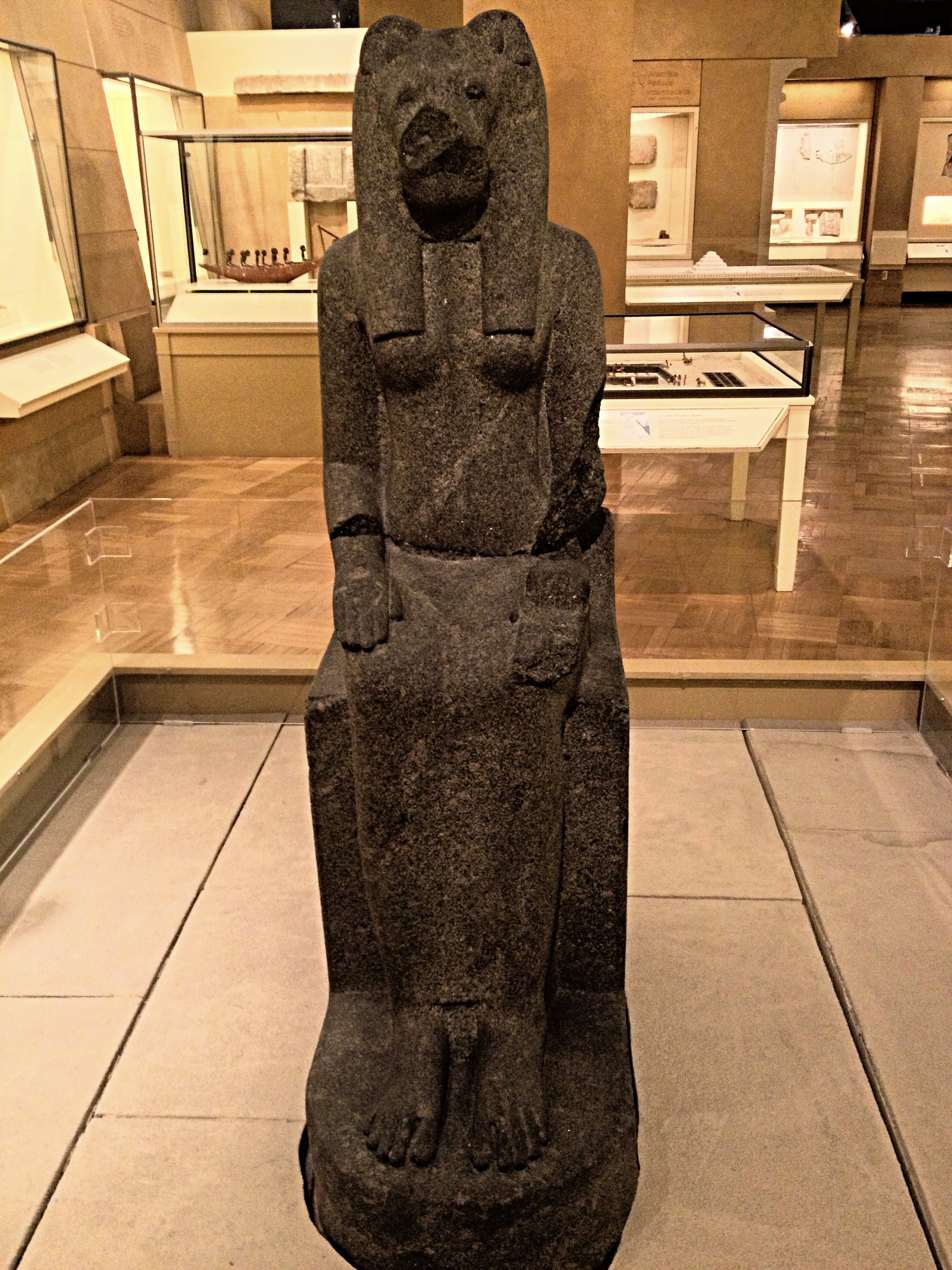
- Height: c. 1.84 meters
- Created: c. 1360 BC
- Present location: Royal Ontario Museum, Ontario, Canada

The Statue of Sekhmet /ˈsɛkˌmɛt/ currently housed in the Gallery of Ancient Egypt at the Royal Ontario Museum (ROM) is a life-sized sculpture of one of the oldest known Egyptian deities. Her name is derived from the Egyptian word "sekhem" (which means "power" or "might") and is often translated as the "Powerful One". Depicted as a woman with the head of a lioness – sometimes with the addition of a sun disc and the uraeus serpent atop her head – Sekhmet is the ancient Egyptian goddess of war who was believed to be a protector of Ma'at (balance or justice) and of the Egyptian people. She was also associated with healing and medicine, and her priests were known for being trained doctors and surgeons of remarkable calibre.

The acquisition of this piece of Egyptian art was made possible by the support of the Louise Hawley Stone Charitable Trust, and is now one of the museum's iconic objects. The statue dates back to the 18th dynasty around 1360 BC, during the reign of Amenhotep III, and is thought to have originated from the Temple of Mut at Karnak, Egypt. The Temple of Mut is perhaps best known for its many statues of Sekhmet, which number in the hundreds. Sekhmet is usually depicted with a lotus flower (symbolising Upper Egypt, the sun, creation, and rebirth) in her right hand, and an ankh (also known as the key of life, which symbolises eternal life) in her left. The statue is made of carved and polished granite and depicts the goddess in a seated position holding only an ankh in her left hand, and stands at a height of around 1.84 meters (6 feet).

The Statue of Sekhmet can be found on Level 3 of the ROM in the Galleries of Africa: Egypt, where close to 2,000 objects from the ROM's Egyptian collection are showcased. The ROM's Egyptian collection comprises around 25,000 artefacts.
