= Colossal quartzite statue of Amenhotep III =

Ancient Egyptian statue, c. 1350 BC

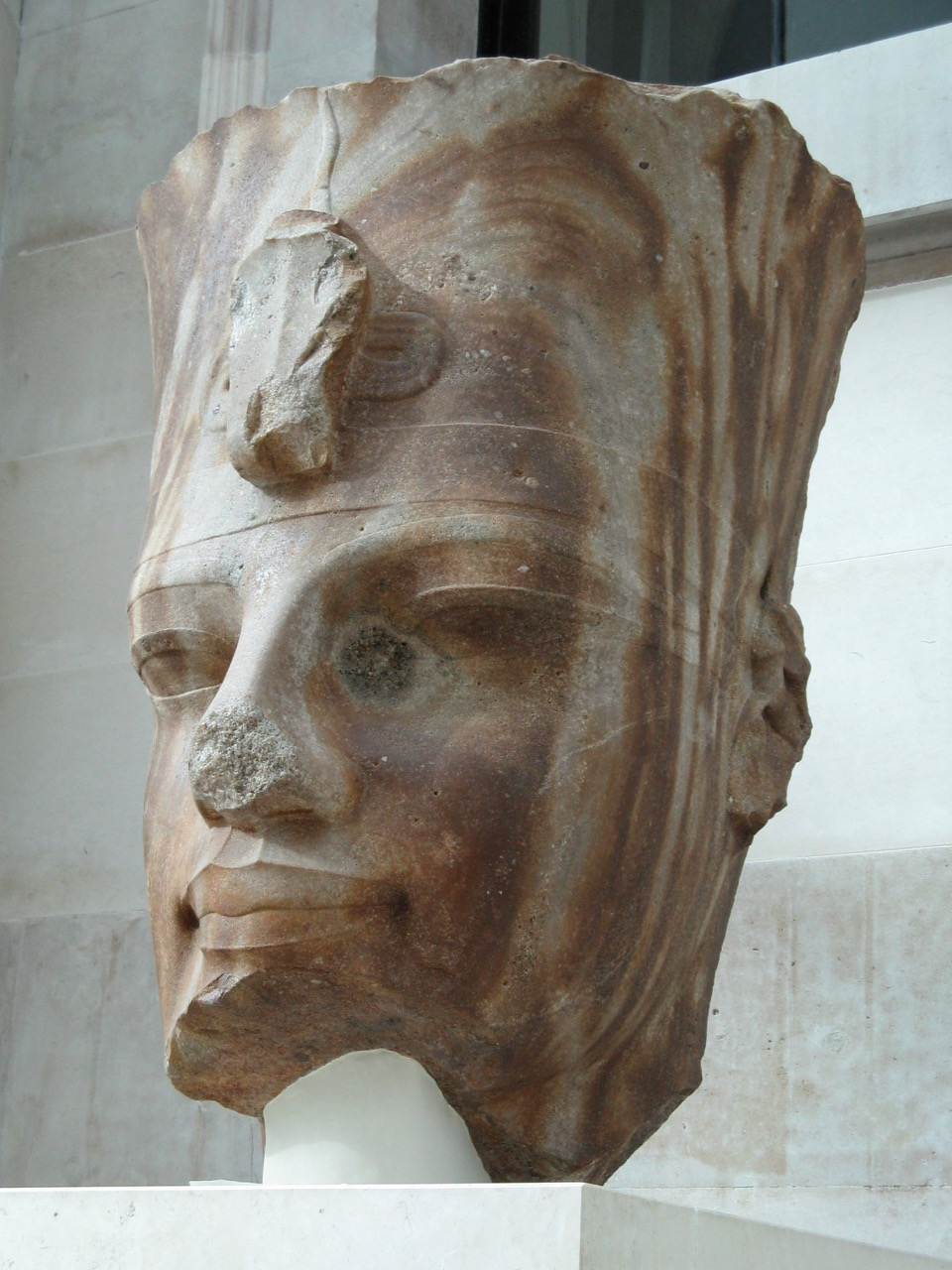
- Material: Quartzite
- Length: 81 cm
- Height: c. 8 meters (original); 1.17 meters
- Width: 66 cm
- Created: c. 1350 BC
- Discovered: Luxor, Egypt
- Present location: British Museum, England, United Kingdom
- Identification: EA 7

The Colossal quartzite statue of Amenhotep III is an ancient Egyptian sculpture created around 1350 BC. It was found in the massive mortuary temple of the pharaoh Amenhotep III on the West Bank of the Nile River at Thebes (Luxor) in Egypt. Only the head of the broken colossal statue survives. It is part of the British Museum's Department of Ancient Egypt and Sudan collection.

This brown quartzite statue was one of a series of near-identical statues that flanked the west side of a colonnaded courtyard. When complete, it would have measured more than 8 metres (26 feet) high without its base, and the body would have stood in the classic pose of the deity Osiris with legs together and arms crossed, holding the crook and the flail, which were symbols of Egyptian kingship. The statue would have worn a short royal kilt and the red crown of Lower Egypt. The discovery in 1964 of the head of one other statue and numerous body-fragments of yet more has allowed the reconstruction of the statue's pose. The statues on the other side of the courtyard were similar, but were made of red granite and wore the white crown of Upper Egypt.

The pose has been interpreted as symbolising the first Sed festival of Amenhotep III, when it was believed that the pharaoh underwent a rite of rejuvenation and became a god while still living. This happened on the 30th anniversary of his rule. As a god, Amenhotep III was then worshipped through this statue and similar ones.

The head is 1.17 meters high, 81 cm long and 66 cm wide. It was purchased from Henry Salt in 1823. It has the reference number EA 7 and is currently displayed in the museum's Great Court. From September 2006-February 2008 it was sent on loan to the United States of America as part of the "Temples and Tombs" travelling exhibition.

== Reading ==
- B. Porter & R. Moss, Topographical Bibliography of Ancient Egyptian Hieroglyphic Texts, Reliefs and Paintings II (Oxford, 1972), p. 453 (with earlier bibliography)
- T. G. H. James & W. V. Davies, Egyptian Sculpture (London, 1983), p. 38, fig.45
- P. Kozloff, B. Bryan and M. Berman, Egypt's Dazzling Sun (Cleveland Museum of Art, 1992), pp. 156–158 = Le Pharaon-Soleil (Paris, 1993), pp. 126–128
- G. Robins, The Art of Ancient Egypt(London, 1997), p. 122, fig.135
- Art and Afterlife in Ancient Egypt (Japan 1999-2000), p. 32
- Temples and Tombs [exhibition catalogue] (American Federation of Arts, 2006) 52, cat no. 10
- P. Nicholson and I. Shaw, Ancient Egyptian Materials and Technology (Cambridge 2000), p. 54
- E.R. Russmann, Eternal Egypt: Masterworks of (University of California Press, 2001)
- N. Strudwick, Masterpieces of Ancient Egypt, London: British Museum Publications, 2006, pp. 154–5
