= Barbara Scholkmann =

German archaeologist

Barbara Scholkmann (born 1941 in Heidenheim) was professor of medieval archaeology at the University of Tübingen until her retirement in 2007. From 2001 to 2006, she was vice-chancellor for study and teaching at Tübingen. Scholkmann is a corresponding member of the German Archaeological Institute. She is a former school teacher.

== Awards ==
- 1999 Research award of the Jubilee Foundation of the Swedish Central Bank.
- 2007 Honorary doctorate of the University of Lund.

== Selected publications ==
- B. Scholkmann: Sindelfingen – Obere Vorstadt. Eine Siedlung des hohen und späten Mittelalters. In: Forsch. u. Ber. Arch. Mittelalter Bad.-Württ. 3, Tübingen 1978.
- B. Scholkmann: Burg Baldenstein. Das „Alte Schloß“ bei Gammertingen. Sigmaringen 1982, ISBN 3-7995-4038-5.
- G. P. Fehring, B. Scholkmann, P. Anstett: Die Stadtkirche St. Dionysius in Esslingen. In: Forsch. u. Ber. Arch. Mittelalter Bad.-Württ. 13, Stuttgart 1995.
- B. Scholkmann, Sönke Lorenz (Hrsg.): Schwaben vor 1000 Jahren. Filderstadt 2002, ISBN 3-935129-03-3.
- B. Scholkmann, Das Mittelalter im Fokus der Archäologie. Archäologie in Deutschland. Sonderheft Plus 2009 (Darmstadt 2009).
- B. Scholkmann/S. Frommer/C. Vossler u. a. (Hrsg.), Zwischen Tradition und Wandel. Archäologie des 15. und 16. Jahrhunderts. Tübinger Forsch. hist. Arch. 3 (Büchenbach 2009).
- B. Scholkmann/S. Frommer, St. Martin in Kornwestheim. Archäologie und Geschichte einer Kirche. Forsch. u. Ber. Arch. Mittelalter Bad.-Württ. 33 (Stuttgart 2012).
- B Scholkmann "The discovery of the hidden middle ages: the research history of medieval archaeology in Germany" in European Journal of Post-Classical Archaeologies, Vol. 3, 2013.

== Festschrift ==
- Jochem Pfrommer, Rainer Schreg (Hrsg.): Zwischen den Zeiten. Archäologische Beiträge zur Geschichte des Mittelalters in Mitteleuropa. Festschrift Barbara Scholkmann. Leidorf, Rahden/Westfalen 2001, ISBN 3-89646-395-0. (Internationale Archäologie – Studia honoraria 15), (mit Schriftverzeichnis bis 2001).
