= Cerro del Villar =

Phoenician city

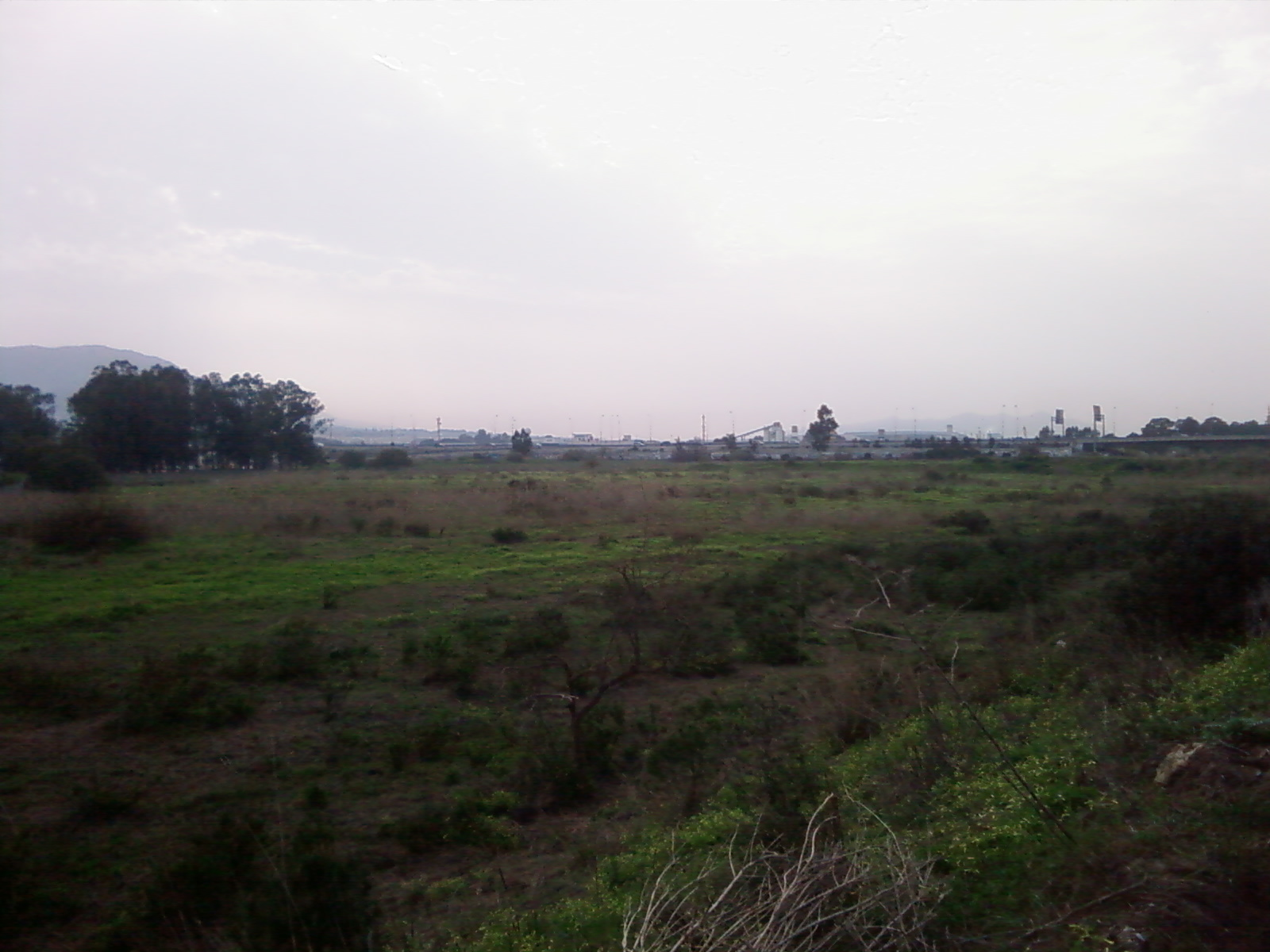

- Location in the Province of Málaga Location in Andalusia Location in Spain
- 36°40′19″N 4°27′49″W
- Type: City
- Periods: Ninth century BC
- Cultures: Phoenicia
- Location: Málaga
- Region: Spain

History
- Abandoned: 584 BC

Site notes
- Archaeologists: María Eugenia Aubet (2003)
- Discovered: 1960
- Condition: BIC
- Owner: City de Málaga
- Public access: Closed

Cerro del Villar, located in the mouth of Guadalhorce river, southern Spain, was a Phoenician city founded in the ninth century BC or eighth century BC. It was abandoned possibly in 584 BC. Since 2003, there have not been any archeological excavations, which was resumed in 2025. Previous excavations were directed by María Eugenia Aubet.

It was declared Bien de Interés Cultural on 9 June 1998.

== Bibliography ==
- Collado Hinarejos, Benjamín (September 2017). Los fenicios en la península Ibérica. Historia del mundo (in Spanish). Madrid: Akal. p. 64. ISBN 978-84-460-4482-6.
