= Mortuary Temple of Amenhotep III =

18th Dynasty temple built for Amenhotep III

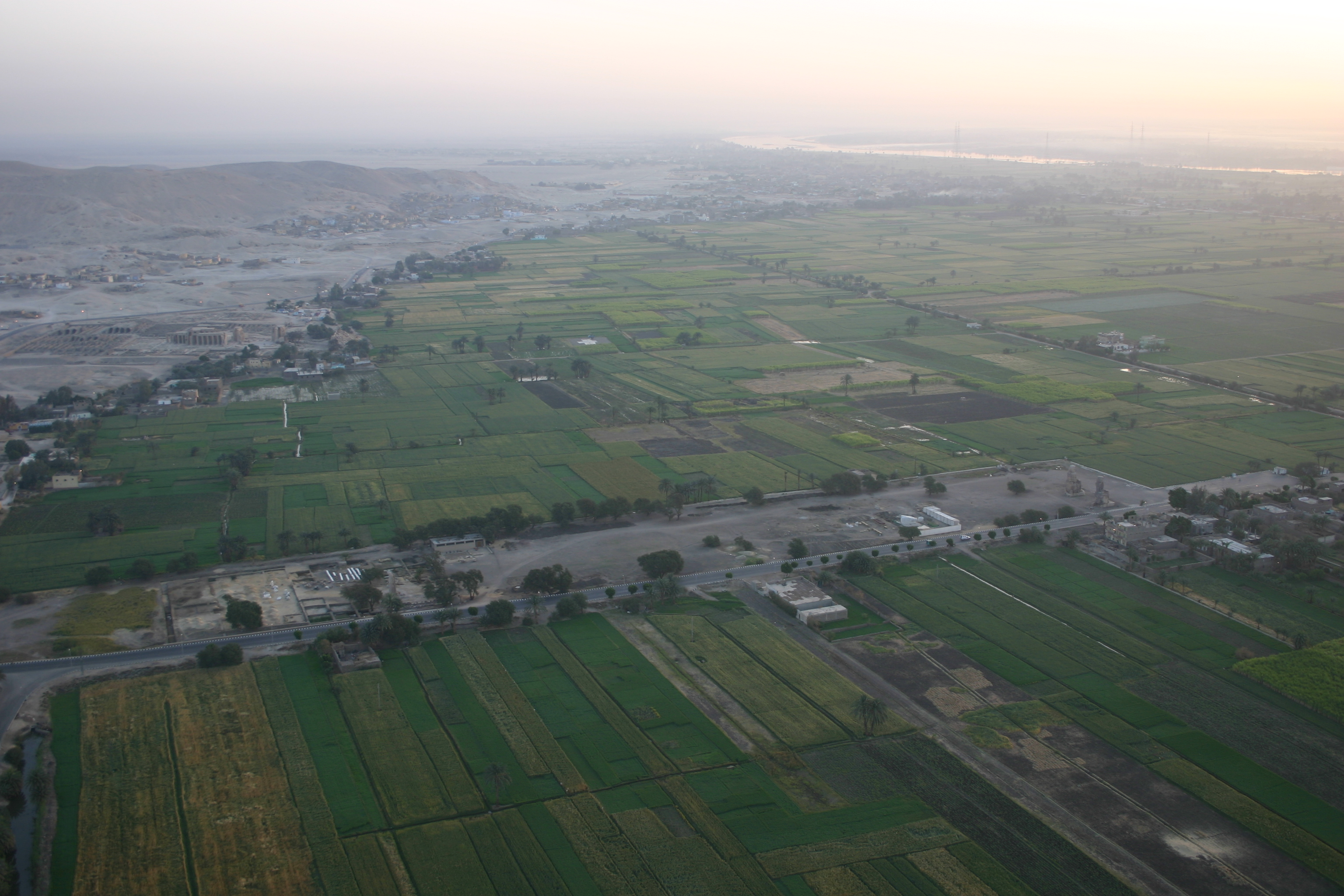
- Aerial view of the Mortuary Temple
- 25.721°N 32.610°E
- Type: Mortuary temple
- Location: Luxor, Egypt

History
- Built: c. 1360 BC

Site notes
- Architect: Amenhotep

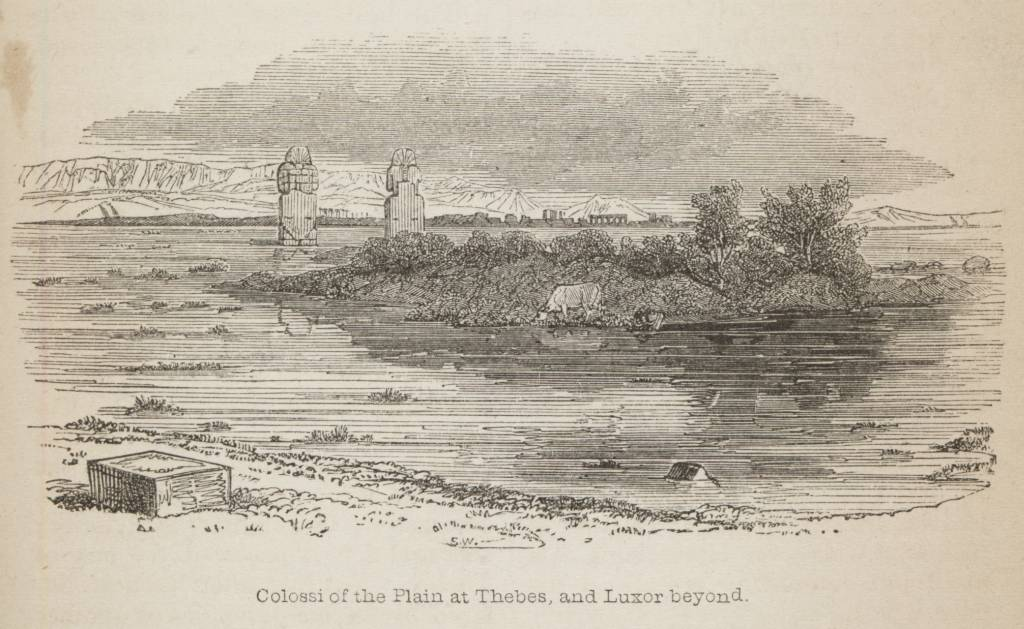
Colossi from a distance in front of the mortuary temple

The Mortuary Temple of Amenhotep III, also known as Kom el-Hettân, was built by the main architect Amenhotep, for Pharaoh Amenhotep III during the 18th dynasty of the New Kingdom. The mortuary temple is located on the Western bank of the Nile River, across from Luxor. During its time, the Mortuary Temple of Amenhotep III was the largest funerary complex in Thebes that was built. Only parts of the mortuary temple's layout remain, as well as the Colossi of Memnon, which are two large stone statues of Amenhotep III and his family guarding the entrance measuring 18 meters (59 feet) high. Because the mortuary temple was built relatively close to the river, the annual flooding caused the site to decay at a more rapid rate. New research indicates that a large majority of the destruction on the mortuary temple can be attributed to the effects of an earthquake. It was long speculated that the earthquake occurred around 27 BC; however, investigations into the mortuary temple and surrounding colossi have debunked this time frame and instead have demonstrated it occurred around 1200 BC. Additional earthquakes after the one in 1200 BC have not been ruled out. The Colossi of Memnon and Amenhotep III Temple Project have helped conserve the site as much as possible.

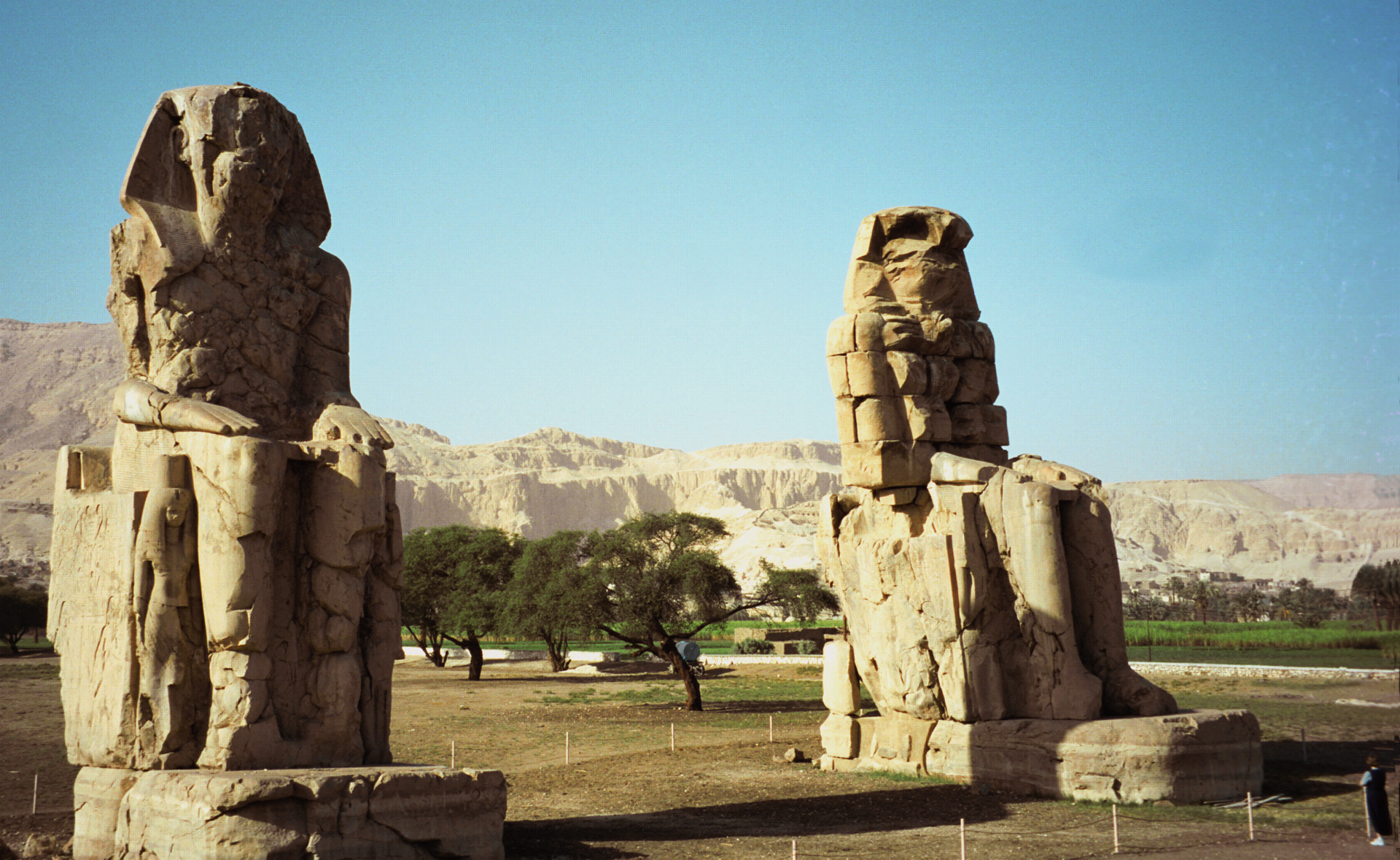
Colossi of Memnon

== Excavation history ==
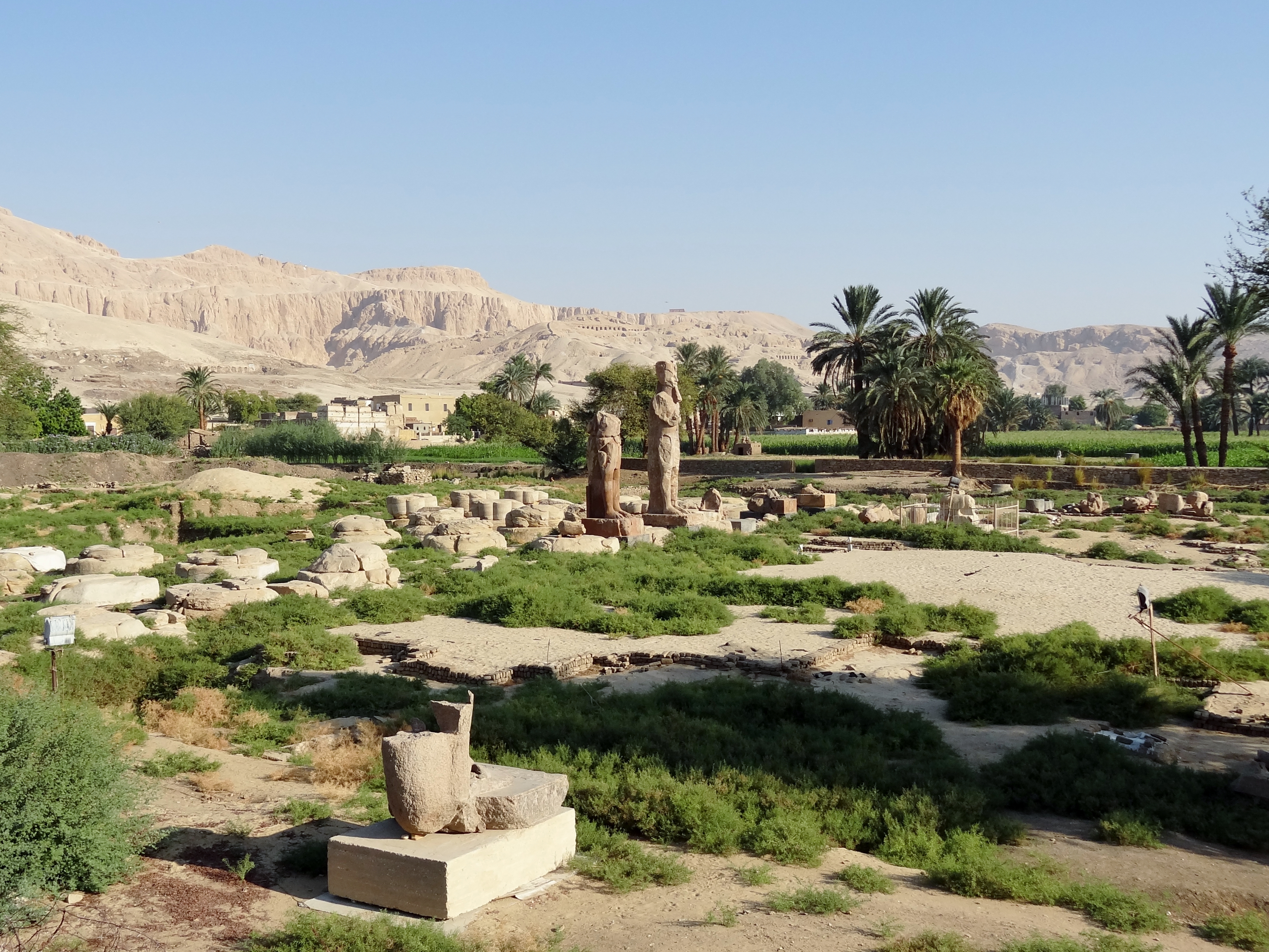
View of the site in 2014

Dr. Hourig Sourouzian was the main excavator in the early 2000s, and the site was visited by Zahi Hawass, although the mortuary temple was previously excavated in the late 1900s. Laurent Bavay examined the pottery from the 1999-2002 excavation seasons at the site. The Hypostyle Hall was cleared by Myriam Alvarez. The mortuary temple has undergone several excavations since the early 2000s, which have garnered new information, including the north wall, undecorated granite pieces, Kushites as bound captives, lists of Nubian towns surrounding the Nile, and red granite colossal statues. Recent geoarchaeological research has shown that the main axis of the temple was constructed on a natural, elongated mound that stood well above the floodplain level of the New Kingdom period. As a result, the Temple area at the west end stood high and dry most of the time and would have been subject to flooding only during very rare high flood events. Another important discovery by the same project has been a previously unknown branch of the Nile on the west side of the Nile Valley. It ran approximately south–north with the Colossi of Memnon placed on the west bank of the river, giving a dramatic riverside entrance to the Temple complex. This branch then ran north past the Ramesseum and other mortuary temples before swinging back east to rejoin the main channel of the Nile somewhere opposite Karnak Temple. This same branch was probably used in the various processional ceremonies that linked the east and west bank temples. It was probably also used to deliver building materials to the site, including the Colossal statues.

== Layout ==
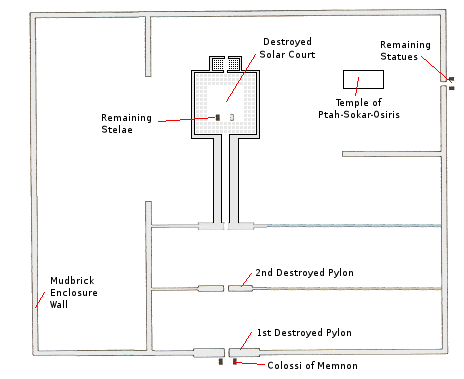
Layout of the Mortuary Temple of Amenhotep III

The temple faced to the east, most likely due to the sun rising in the east since Amenhotep III revered the sun god Amun. The Colossi of Memnon can be found at the front of the mortuary temple. As one enters, the long Hypostyle Hall leads to the Peristyle Sun Court and the whole area is surrounded by three pylons, also known as gates. The Sun Court is divided into the north and south halves and consists of statues of Amenhotep III and the gods. The north side had brown quartzite statues from Lower Egypt, while the south side had red granite statues from Aswan in Upper Egypt.

== Purpose ==
The mortuary temple's primary purpose was as a place for offerings for Amenhotep III after his passing and movement into the afterlife. The whole temple also symbolizes a mound and the "emergence of the world from the primeval waters of creation" every time the Nile River flooded the temple since the Egyptians believed that the ground was formed by a mound emerging from the water. Therefore, it is believed that the temple was intentionally built on a flood plain so that this ideology could come true. Amenhotep III wanted to be revered as a god on Earth, not just in the afterlife. He built this enormous mortuary temple to leave a legacy that he ruled on Earth as a living god. Examining the remains within the temple, the temple indicates the unification of Egypt and the Sed Festival of Amenhotep III. The statues within the temple were used during rituals commonly found within the Sed Festival; however, relief fragments show that the temple was not yet standing during Amenhotep III's first Sed Festival. A time frame for when a celebration at a later date may have occurred within the temple is II peret 29 or III peret 1. These celebrations took place in a courtyard within the temple during the last 10 years of Amenhotep III's reign. The importance of the Sed Festival is that it portrays a reenactment of the unification of Egypt. To further reinforce the idea of unification, building materials from Upper and Lower Egypt were used, demonstrating Amenhotep III maintained sema-tawy (unification) of both lands. Additionally, Amenhotep III established the idea of Maat (justice and peace) over Islet (chaos) by having the statues of fauna and therefore having control over them, as well as depicting bound Egyptian enemies (such as the Nubian, Asiatics, Mesopotamians, Aegeans, and Hittites) next to statues of himself.

== Major findings ==
=== Statues ===
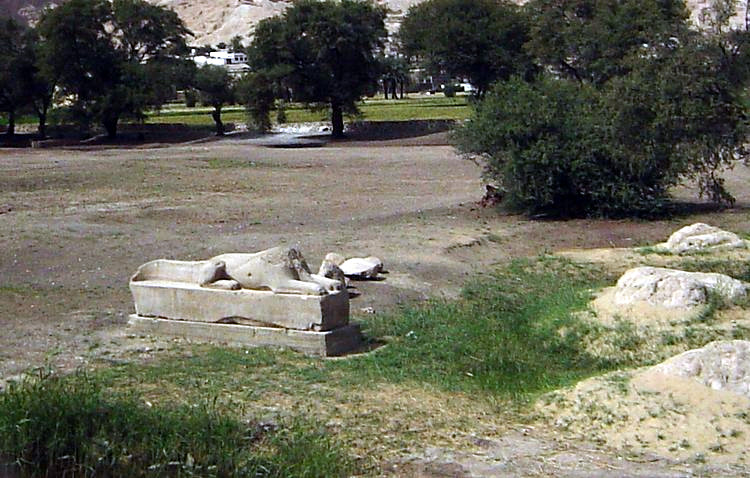
Crocodile sphinx seen from the road

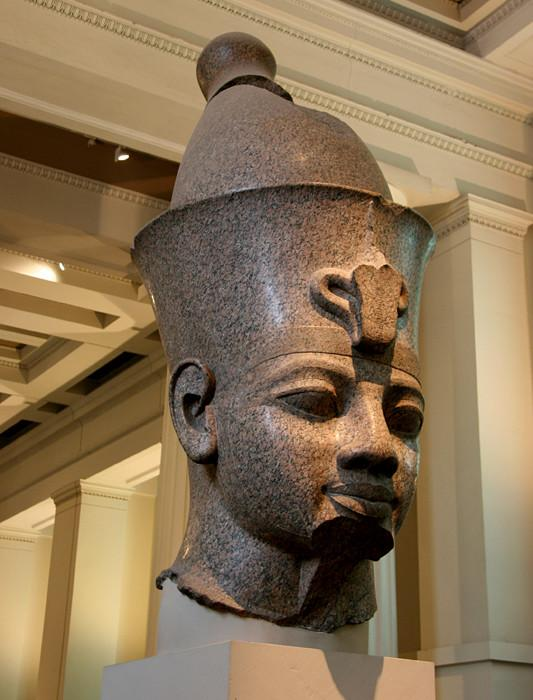
Colossal red granite statue of Amenhotep III

There are hundreds to possibly thousands of statues within the temple. Many statues are unique to the temple, and their rarity and form are also specific to this temple. The majority of the statues were for Gods such as the Sekhmet (lion-headed goddess), animals (such as lion-crocodile sphinx, jackals, scarabs beetles, and a white hippopotamus), other Egyptian gods, and Amenhotep III as a god. The statues' purpose correlates with the mortuary temple's purpose: the sed festival. Within the festival, there are many rituals that make up Amenhotep's III first Sed. The Sekhmet statues served an important purpose in the ritual festivals. Looking at the statues, some Sekhmet statues are standing, some are sitting, and some are holding a papyrus scepter in the left hand and the symbol of life in the right. Jean Yoyotte, a French Egyptologist, comments that the goddess Sekhmet served an important role as the "mistress of drunkenness" who provides healing qualities, which are meant to cure any illnesses of Amenhotep III. Also, she played an important role in the royal jubilee to "protect the sun-king against the enemies of the sun."

Two specific rituals in which the other animal statues were used are the solar ritual and the creation of the sky map. The creation of the sky map in the mortuary temple was seen throughout the 18th dynasty, especially Thutmose III, to honor the deities of the heavens. Sekhmet statues were used in creating the sky map in addition to the lion-crocodile sphinx, statues of a Hippo, and bull statue. The lion-crocodile sphinx is the third-dimensional representation found. The white hippopotamus is thought to have served a role in the white Hippopotamus ritual, which had been seen under Thutmose III. For the specific solar festival, statues of Asbet, Maat, Hu, Horus, and Isis for times of the day were seen. Outside of the Sed-Festival statuary, recent excavations around the pylons have found several colossi scattered throughout the temple. The most notable preserved colossi are the Colossi of Memnon, located at the first pylon. Fragments of a quartzite colossus, such as the chest, fallen torso, and knee, were found behind the Colossi of Memnon. Near the second pylon, another colossus of Amenhotep III made of monolithic quartzite was found. Examinations of the plinths of the colossi revealed imagery of the unification of Egypt and foreign lands that were under Egypt's rule.

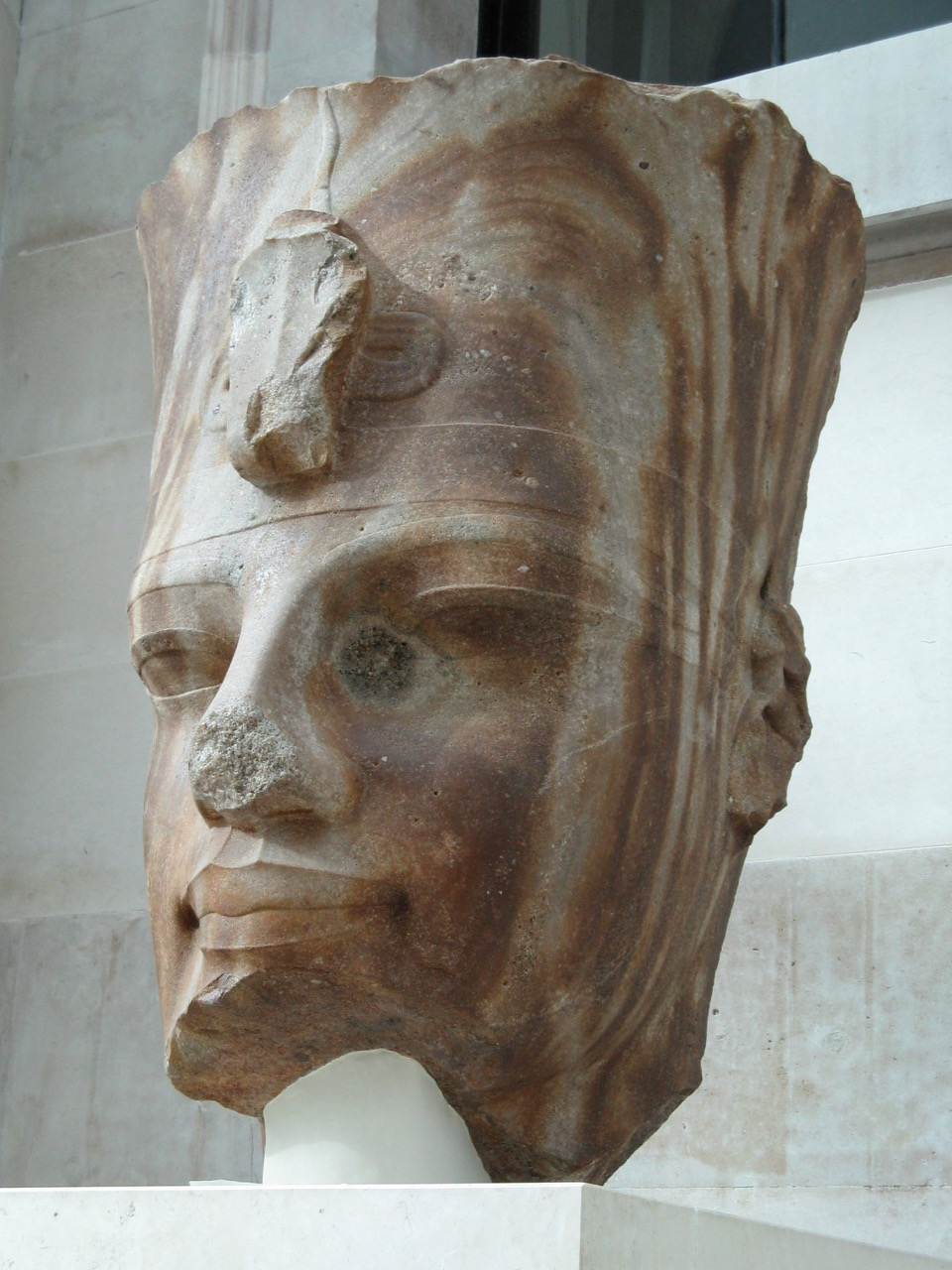
Colossal quartzite statue of Amenhotep III

=== Pottery ===
Laurent Bavay, a Belgian Egyptologist, examined some of the pottery and found ring-based cups, beer jars, and wine amphorae. These pieces were found in the Peristyle Sun Court and Third Pylon. Pottery found within the mortuary temple can be dated back to the New Kingdom and the Late Roman Period. Moreover, pottery shards found on the eroded northern wall of the temple provided evidence for the occurrence of earthquakes.

=== Stelae ===
The two most prominent stelae within the mortuary temple are the Northern and the Southern Stelae. The northern, found in the Peristyle Court, which stands in full form, underwent several conservation efforts in 2010–2012. Similarly, the Southern Stelae was raised in the middle of the 20th century and mentions Amenhotep III describing the temple as "magnified".

== The temple's future ==
Zahi Hawass, Mansour Boraik, Ali el-Asfar, and Ibrahim Soliman want to bring back the artifacts and findings from the Mortuary Temple of Amenhotep III to the original site since they are dispersed in different museums. Many new statues and colossi continue to be excavated, but many more statues and artifacts damaged by the earthquake are waiting to be erected and displayed. Those working on conserving the temple hope to form an open-air museum and eventually bring awareness of the importance of on-site conservation; however, due to a lack of funding, no current progress has been made.

== See also ==
- Colossal quartzite statue of Amenhotep III found at the Mortuary Temple
- Medinet Habu (Mortuary Temple of Ramesses III)
