= María Eugenia Aubet =

Spanish archaeologist (1943–2024)

María Eugenia Aubet Semmler
- Born: 30 April 1943; Barcelona, Spain
- Died: 18 February 2024 (aged 80); Barcelona, Catalonia, Spain
- Education: University of Barcelona (BA)

María Eugenia Aubet Semmler (30 April 1943 – 18 February 2024) was a Spanish archaeologist and historian. A professor of prehistory and founding director of the Archaeology Laboratory at Pompeu Fabra University, she was considered a pioneer of Phoenician and Punic archeology in Europe.

== Biography ==
María Eugenia Aubet Semmler was born in Barcelona, Spain, in 1943. She attended the University of Barcelona, graduating with a bachelor's in ancient history in 1969 and a doctorate in history in 1970.

After over a decade at the Autonomous University of Barcelona, in 1993, Aubet became a senior professor of prehistory at Pompeu Fabra University in Barcelona, where she founded and directed the Archaeology Laboratory. Her primary research areas were Phoenician–Punic archaeology and Mediterranean protohistory.

From 1986 to 1992, she led research on Phoenician colonization in the Bay of Málaga and its hinterland, financed by the Andalusian government. The Catalan government also supported her work on Mediterranean prehistory and archeology. Other significant projects included her 1991 research on Tartessian cultural exchange and mechanisms of social transformation during the Atlantic Bronze Age and the Orientalizing period; her work as co-director of research on the Phoenicians in the Nerja area, also in 1991; explorations of colonial commerce in the Mediterranean in the 8th–6th centuries BCE, which she conducted in 1991–1993 and 1994–1997; and various excavations and studies on Phoenician–Punic cultural contact and colonialism, from 2000 to 2008.

Notably, she led the archaeological excavations of the Phoenician necropolis of Tir Al-Bass in Tyre, Lebanon, as part of a project by the Spanish Ministry of Education. She and her collaborators were the first to obtain permission from the Lebanese authorities to excavate in the area of what was once the center of ancient Tyre, where the city's temples, palaces, and markets were located. Between 1997 and 2009, she and her collaborators excavated almost 300 Phoenician tombs. These remains from the necropolis, at the entrance to the city of Tyre, were dated to the 9th and 10th centuries BCE, and were uncovered alongside hundred of funerary amphoras, amulets, and jewels. After three years' pause, Aubet and her team resumed excavations in May 2014.

She also worked on various projects to coordinate research around the Mediterranean. From 1994 to 1997, she directed the European Union's Med-Campus "Odysseus" research exchange program, focusing on Phoenician archaeology, which connected experts in Barcelona, Beirut, Cyprus, Tübingen, Cagliari, and Malta.

Aubet was the author of various books on Mediterranean archaeology. Her 1987 work Tiro y las colonias fenicias de occidente is one of the most consulted and translated books in the field of Mediterranean protohistory; it was first published in English as The Phoenicians and the West: Politics, Colonies, and Trade in 1993.

In 2005, she was honored by the government of Catalonia for her work promoting university research. After retiring in 2016, she was awarded the Gold Medal of Merit in the Fine Arts in 2019.

She died in 2024, at age 79, in Barcelona.

== Selected works ==
- Tiro y las colonias fenicias de occidente (1987)
- Los fenicios en Málaga (1998)
- La colonización fenicia de Occidente: estado de la investigación en los inicios del siglo XXI (2002)
- Comercio y colonialismo en el Próximo Oriente Antiguo: los antecedentes coloniales de III y II milenios a.C. (2007)
- Tiro y las colonias fenicias de Occidente (2009)
- La necrópolis fenicia de Al-Bass. Informe preliminar de la campaña de excavaciones de 2008–2009 (2015)
