= Hajjaj =

Hajjaj (Arabic: حجاج, romanized: Ḥaǧǧāǧ or Ḥadjdjādj), also sometimes spelled Haggag or Haggiag, may refer to:

== People ==
- Al-Hajjaj ibn Yusuf (661-714), military governor of the Umayyad caliphate
- Emad Hajjaj, Palestinian-Jordanian editorial cartoonist
- Al-Ḥajjāj ibn Yūsuf ibn Maṭar (786-833), translated Euclid's Elements into Arabic
- Al-Hajjaj ibn Ustadh Hurmuz (d. 1009), Buyid general and governor
- Muslim ibn al-Hajjaj, Islamic author of Hadith
- Yusuf Abu al-Haggag, patron of the Abu Haggag Mosque

== Places ==
- Hajjaj, Iran, a village in Semnan Province, Iran
- Abu Haggag Mosque

== See also ==
- Raef Haggag, full name of singer Raef
- Hajj (disambiguation)
