= History of the Karnak Temple complex =

History of temple complex in Egypt

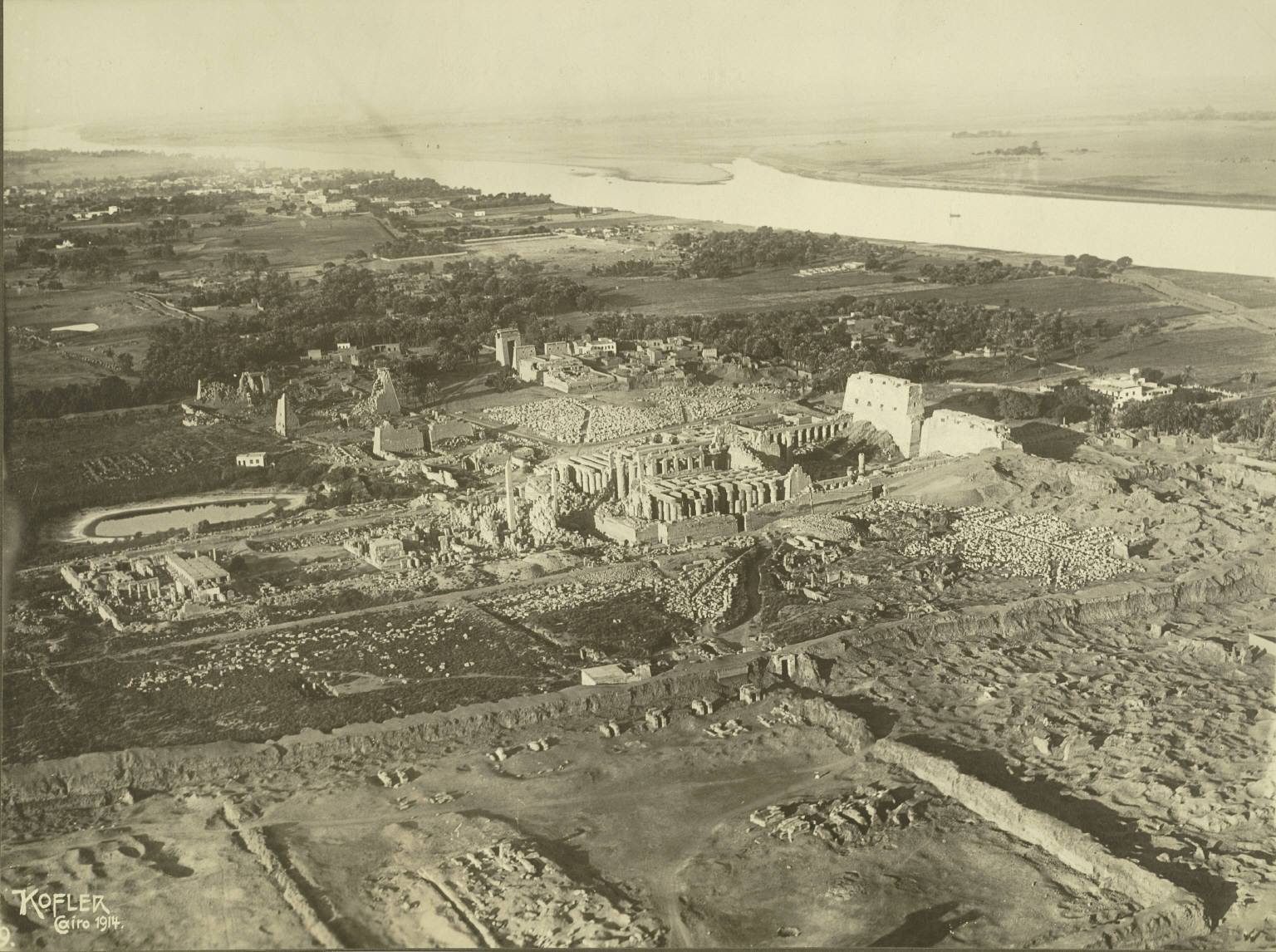
Photograph of the Karnak Temple complex taken in 1914, Cornell University Library

The history of the Karnak Temple complex is largely the history of Thebes. The city does not appear to have been of any significance before the Eleventh Dynasty (c. 2150–c. 1991 BC), and any temple building here would have been relatively small and unimportant, with any shrines being dedicated to the early god of Thebes, Montu. The earliest artifact found in the area of the temple is a small, eight-sided column from the Eleventh Dynasty, which mentions Amun-Re. An inscription in the tomb of Intef II (r. 2112–2063 BC) mentions a 'house of Amun', which implies some structure, whether a shrine or a small temple is unknown. The ancient name for Karnak, Ipet-Isut (usually translated as 'most select of places') only really refers to the central core structures of the Precinct of Amun-Re, and was in use as early as the 11th Dynasty, again implying the presence of some form of temple before the Middle Kingdom expansion.

Map of Karnak Temple complex

== Middle Kingdom ==
By the time the Eleventh Dynasty Theban kings had become rulers of all Egypt, the area of Karnak was already considered holy ground, some form of structure for the worship of Amun probably existed before the reunification, and it seems to have been located somewhere within the Karnak area. The unification of Egypt brought Amun (the tribal god of the region) increased power and wealth, and he was gradually merged with the sun god Ra, to become Amun-Ra. The White Chapel of Senusret I and the Middle Kingdom court are the earliest remains of buildings within the temple area. Close to the Sacred lake, excavations have located a planned settlement.

The major construction of this era was the laying out of the Middle Kingdom court.

== New Kingdom ==
The New Kingdom saw the relatively modest temple expanded into a huge state religious centre, as the wealth of Egypt increased.

=== Eighteenth Dynasty ===
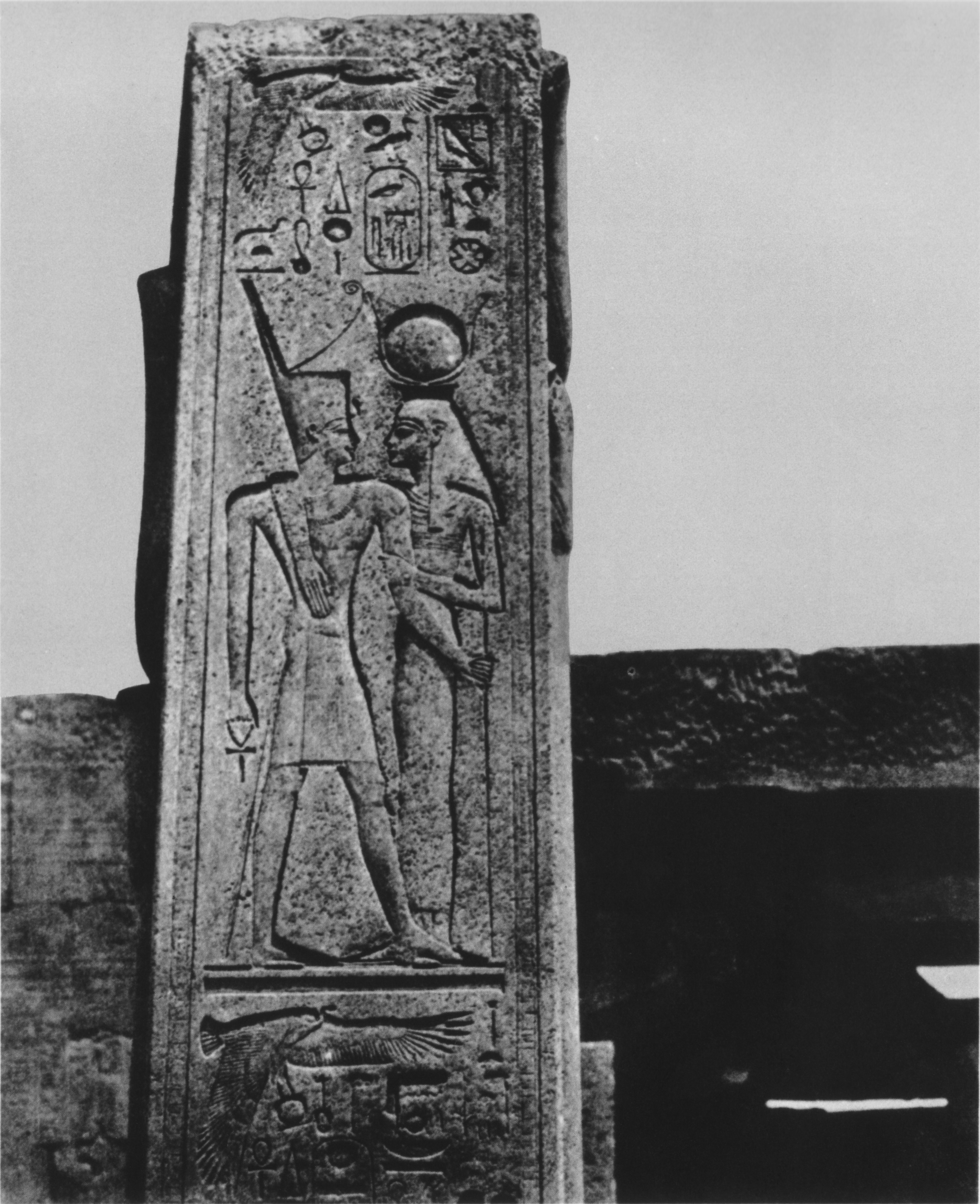
Stele of Karnak, taken by Maxime Du Camp, around 1850

Major expansion of the temple complex took place during the Eighteenth Dynasty. Amenhotep I constructed a barque shrine and a gateway. Thutmose I erected an enclosure wall around the Middle Kingdom temple, connecting the Fourth and Fifth pylons, which comprise the earliest part of the temple still standing in situ. They contain fourteen papyrus columns and the two obelisks of Hatshepsut, which were later hidden from view by walls set up by Thutmose III. Thutmose II laid out a Festival Courtyard at the front of the temple, removed by later construction, but block of which have been recovered from the fill in the Third Pylon. Under Hatshepsut and Thutmose III, another enclosure wall fortified with towers was erected, and the nearby Sacred Lake was either constructed or enlarged. During the reign of Thutmose III, the main temple itself was extended by 50% with the addition of a building called the Akh-menu. This is normally translated as "the most glorious of monuments", but there is an alternative translation. According to Gardiner's Egyptian Grammar, the word akh can mean either glory or blessed/living spirit (For instance, Akhenaten is often translated as "living spirit of Aten"). So an alternative translation is "monument to living spirit". It is now known as the Festival Hall of Thutmose III, which is seemingly decorated to echo a huge tent shrine, complete with awnings and tent poles.

In this temple, the Karnak king list, shows Thutmose III with some of the earlier kings that built parts of the temple complex. After a brief period of interruption during the Amarna Period, when the Egyptian capital was moved to Akhetaten, construction resumed at Karnak under Tutankhamun and Horemheb. The Ninth pylon was erected along the southern axis using material known as talatat from the now demolished Akhetaten.

=== Nineteenth Dynasty ===
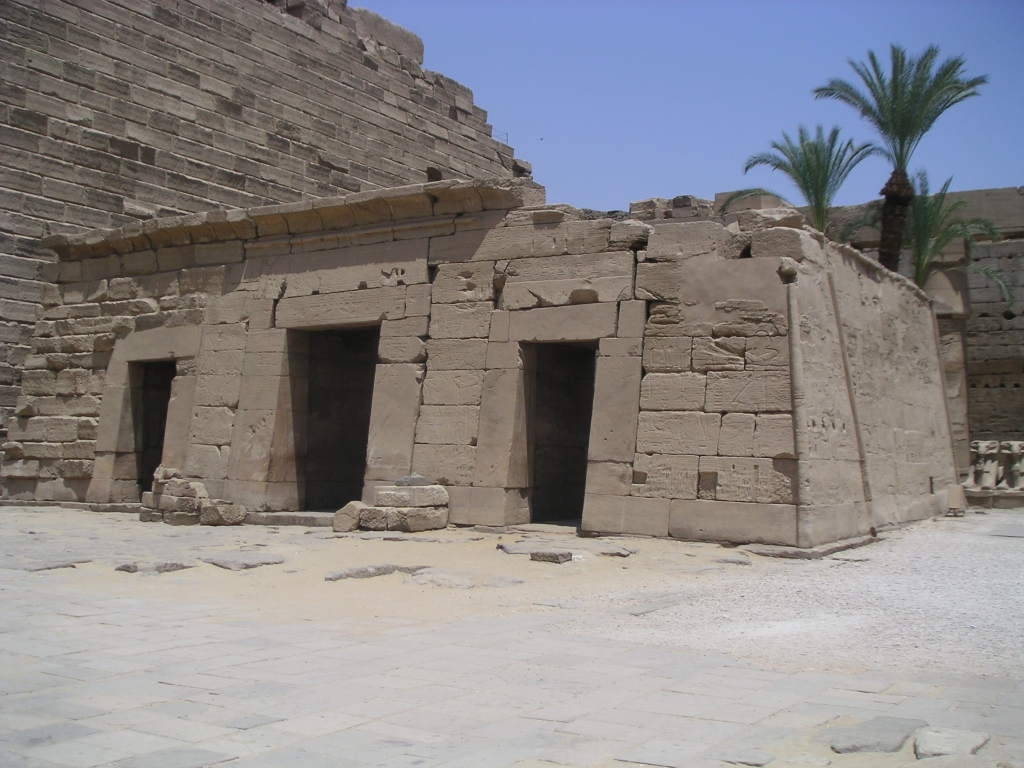
Seti II's barque shrine

Construction of the Great Hypostyle Hall may have also begun during the Eighteenth Dynasty, though most building was undertaken under Seti I and Ramesses II. Merenptah commemorated his victories over the Sea Peoples on the walls of the Cachette Court, the start of the processional route to the Luxor Temple. This Great Inscription (which has now lost about a third of its content) shows the king's campaigns and eventual return with booty and prisoners. Next to this inscription is the Victory Stela, which is largely a copy of the more famous Israel Stela, which was found on the West Bank funerary complex of Merenptah. Merenptah's son Seti II added 2 small obelisks in front of the Second Pylon, and a triple bark-shrine to the north of the processional avenue in the same area. This was constructed of sandstone, with a chapel to Amun flanked by those of Mut and Khonsu.

The last rulers of this dynasty added little to the temple complex.

=== Twentieth Dynasty ===
As the power of the Egyptian Empire declined, construction declined in all of Thebes, and this is reflected in the building work carried out during this time. The Temple of Khonsu was also built and then expanded during this period under Ramesses III and IV, and a large barque station was added in front of the Second pylon. This construction is large enough to be a major temple elsewhere, and is similar to the mortuary temple of Ramesses III at Medinet Habu.

After this, the later kings of the period added little to the overall complex, and concentrated on the Temple of Khonsu. The fading power of the dynasty is illustrated by the depiction of the High Priest Amenhotep being shown in the same scale as Ramesses IX.

== Third Intermediate Period ==
In the Third Intermediate Period, a fragmentation of Egypt took place, with the pharaoh ruling in the north and the High Priests of Amun ruling in Thebes. The northern kings seem to have constructed nothing and added little to the complex, but the High Priests continued to decorate the Temple of Khonsu, especially Herihor and Pinedjem I.

=== Twenty second Dynasty ===
The Libyan kings of the 22nd Dynasty seem to have planned to layout the area to the of the Second Pylon with a colonnade and a new gateway (which has since been replaced by the First Pylon). This new construction surrounded the barque shrines of Seti II and Ramesses III. Between this later temple and the Second Pylon Shoshenq I commemorated his conquests and military campaigns in Syria-Palestine by constructing the Bubastis Portal.

=== Twenty-fifth Dynasty ===
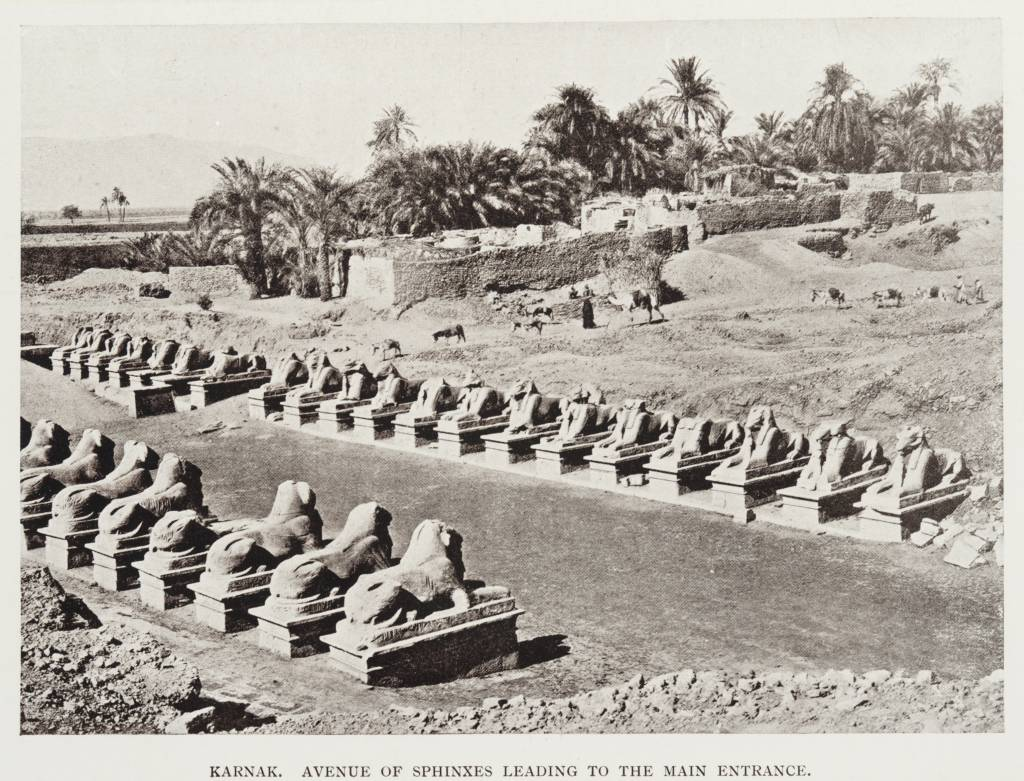
The Avenue of Sphinxes

Taharqa is the only king that made additions to the complex, building the Edifice of Tarhaqa to the forecourt between the First and Second Pylons. This meant that the Avenue of Sphinxes was moved to the sides of the court, where they are still located. He also added a colonnade to the Precinct of Montu

== Late Period ==
=== Thirtieth Dynasty ===
The last major change to the temple's layout was the addition of the First pylon and the massive enclosure walls that surround the whole Karnak complex, both constructed by Nectanebo I, completing the layout started by the kings of the 22nd Dynasty.

== Final developments ==
=== Ptolemaic ===
Philip Arrhidaeus replaced the shrine of Thutmose III with a red-granite shrine. It comprises 2 rooms, aligned with the main axis of the temple. The Opet temple was the last important cult building to be constructed in the Karnak complex.

=== Christian era ===
In 323 AD, Constantine the Great recognised the Christian religion, and in 356 ordered the closing of pagan temples throughout the empire. Karnak was by this time mostly abandoned, and Christian churches were founded amongst the ruins, the most famous example of this is the reuse of the Festival Hall of Thutmose III's central hall, where painted decorations of saints and Coptic inscriptions can still be seen.

== Rediscovery ==
=== Greek and Roman accounts ===
References to the complex are found in Herodotus’, Diodorus Siculus, Strabo and presumably Hecataeus of Abdera and Manetho, but we only retain fragments of their works, though none of these authors relates more than rudimentary information about the complex. Strabo states that Thebes at the time of his visit is nothing more than a collection of smaller villages, though its once grandness could still be imagined.

=== European rediscovery ===
Thebes' exact placement was unknown in medieval Europe, though both Herodotus and Strabo gave the exact location of Thebes and how long up the Nile one must travel to reach it. In addition, maps of Egypt, based on the 2nd century Claudius Ptolemaeus' mammoth work Geographia, had been circulating in Europe since the late 14th century, all of them showing Thebes' (Diospolis) location. Despite this, several European authors of the 15th and 16th century, who visited only Lower Egypt and published their travel accounts, like Joos van Ghistele and André Thevet, put Thebes in or close to Memphis.

The Karnak temple complex is first described by an unknown Venetian in 1589, though his account relates no name for the complex. This account, housed in the Biblioteca Nazionale Centrale di Firenze, is unique, in that it is the first known European mention, since the ancient Greek and Roman writers, of a whole range of monuments in Upper Egypt and Nubia, including Karnak, Luxor temple, the Colossi of Memnon, Esna, Edfu, Kom Ombo, Philae and others.

Karnak ("Carnac") as a village name, and name of the complex, is first attested in 1668, when two Capuchin missionary brothers, Protais and Charles François d'Orléans, travelled though the area. Protais' writing about their travel was published by Melchisédech Thévenot (Relations de divers voyages curieux, 1670s–1696 editions) and Johann Michael Vansleb (The Present State of Egypt, 1678).

The first drawing of Karnak, rather inaccurate and frequently confusing when viewed with modern eyes, is found in Paul Lucas' travel account of 1704, Voyage du Sieur paul Lucas au Levant. He had travelled in Egypt between 1699 and 1703. The drawing shows a mixture of the Precinct of Amun-Re and the Precinct of Montu, based on a complex confined by the three huge Ptolemaic gateways of Ptolemy III Euergetes / Ptolemy IV Philopator, and the massive 113m long, 43m high and 15m thick, first Pylon of the Precinct of Amun-Re.

Karnak was visited and described in succession by Claude Sicard and his travel companion Pierre Laurent Pincia (1718 and 1720–21), Granger (1731), Frederick Louis Norden (1737–38), Richard Pococke (1738), James Bruce (1769), Charles-Nicolas-Sigisbert Sonnini de Manoncourt (1777), William George Browne (1792–93), and finally by a number of scientists of the Napoleon expedition, including Vivant Denon, during 1798–1799. Claude-Étienne Savary describes the complex in rather great detail in his work of 1785; especially in light of the fact that it is a fictional account of a pretend journey to Upper Egypt, composed out of information from other travellers. Savary did visit Lower Egypt in 1777–78, and published a work about that, too.

== Modern archaeology ==
In April 2018, the Egyptian Ministry of Antiquities announced the discovery of the shrine of the Egyptian god Osiris- Ptah Neb, dating back to the 25th dynasty. According to archaeologist Essam Nagy, the material remains from the area contained clay pots, the lower part of a sitting statue and part of a stone panel showing an offering table filled with a sheep and a goose which werethe symbols of the god Amun.

== Bibliography ==
- Blyth, Elizabeth (2006). Karnak: Evolution of a Temple. Oxford: Routledge. ISBN 0-415-40487-8.
- Kemp, Barry (1989). Ancient Egypt: Anatomy of a Civilization. Oxford: Routledge. ISBN 0-415-06346-9.
- Smith, W. Stevenson (1998). The Art and Architecture of Ancient Egypt. Rev. by William Kelly Simpson (3rd ed.). New Haven: Yale University Press. ISBN 0-300-07747-5.
- Strudwick, Nigel & Helen (1999). Thebes in Egypt: A Guide to the Tombs and Temples of Ancient Luxor. Ithaca, New York. ISBN 0-8014-8616-5.
