= Opet Festival =

Ancient Egyptian festival

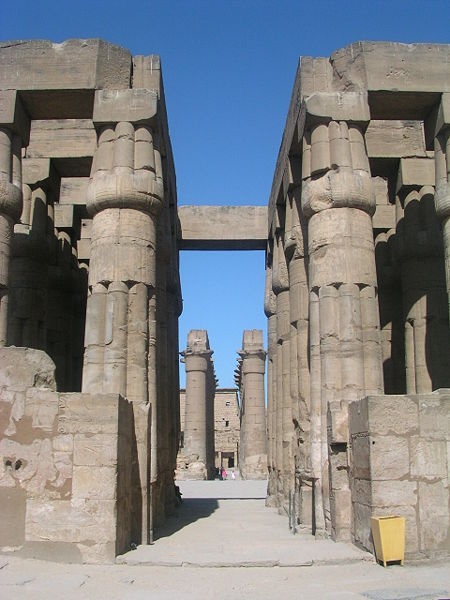
Luxor Temple, the final destination of the barque of Amun-Re during the Opet festival

The Opet Festival (Ancient Egyptian: ḥb nfr n jpt lit. 'beautiful festival of Opet') was an annual ancient Egyptian festival celebrated in Thebes (Luxor), especially in the New Kingdom and later periods, during the second month of the season of Akhet, the flooding of the Nile.

The festival was celebrated to promote the Fertility of Amun-Re and the Pharaoh, who was believed to be the spiritual offspring of Amun-Re – the son or daughter of Amun-Re. John Coleman Darnell argues that “Opet began on II Akhet 15 under Thutmose III and lasted 11 days (Sethe 1907: 824, line 10); by the beginning of the reign of Ramesses III, the festival stretched over 24 days.”

The festival included a ritual procession of the barque (a ceremonial boat used to transport statues of gods and deities) of the cult statue of “Amun-Re, supreme god, his wife Mut, and his son Khons.” The procession carried the statue for 2 km from Karnak Temple to “Luxor Temple, destination of the Opet Feast.” At the Luxor Temple, a ritual marriage ceremony took place in the Birth room between the Pharaoh and Amun-Re, spiritually linking them to ensure the Pharaoh’s fertility and reinstate the Pharaoh as the intermediary between the gods and Egypt. During the marriage ceremony, the Pharaoh was ceremonially reborn through a re-crowning ceremony, emphasising the fertile nature of the Pharaoh and legitimising his divine right to rule.

The ancient festival survives in the present-day feast of Sheikh Yūsuf al-Haggāg, an Islamic holy man whose boat is carried around Luxor in celebration of his life. This Mawlid celebration takes place around the vicinity of the Abu Haggag Mosque.

== History of the festival ==
The Opet festival became a mainstream festival in the early New Kingdom (circa. 1539–1075 B.C.) when the 18th dynasty came to power, after

“driving out the Hyksos invaders who had occupied the northern part of the Nile Valley for 200 years. Egypt’s new rulers wasted no time in making its capital city Thebes a vast ceremonial stage to celebrate the consolidation of power, and the Opet festival took centre stage”.

During the reign of Thutmose III (1458–1426 B.C.), the festival lasted for 11 days. By the start of the rule of Ramesses III in 1187 B.C., it had expanded to 24 days; by his death in 1156 B.C., it had stretched to 27.

The most accurate information of the history of the Opet festival comes from the changing nature of the route between Karnak and Luxor temples. Marina Escolano-Poveda provides a comprehensive analysis of the shifting path between the temples:

“The processional route between the temples varied with time, sometimes traveling by foot along the Avenue of Sphinxes, a road nearly two miles long, lined with statues of the mythical beasts.
At other times, the sacred statue traveled from Karnak to Luxor in a specially made bark, known in Egyptian as the Userhat-Amun (‘mighty of prow is Amun’). This vessel was built of Lebanon cedar covered with gold. Its prow and stern were decorated with a ram’s head, sacred to the god.”

Although the nature of the route between temples remained the same, the length of the festival changed with each ruler. In certain years, the barque of Amun-Re travelled only from Karnak to Luxor,

“... a ritual journey from their shrines at Karnak to the temple of Luxor”.

However, the return journey from Luxor to Karnak also acted as a celebration,

“... part of the Opet Feast, it must have taken place on the return journey to Karnak.”

== Importance of the festival to society ==
Amun, the king god in Ancient Egyptian mythology. The Opet festival incorporated him to promote the pharaoh's fertility.

New Kingdom Egyptian society depended on the generosity of the gods to ensure they received what they needed. Because they lacked scientific understanding to explain specific events, the Egyptians looked upon each natural event as a sign or intervention from a specific god who wanted them to maintain the natural order of the universe, or ma’at. To appease the gods, Egyptians routinely made offerings to the gods of sacrifices, prayers, and festivals. In this perceived symbiotic relationship, celebrations of the gods provided assurance to Egyptians, allowing them to live their lives without fear of divine intervention.

The Opet festival re-established essential communication between the gods and Egyptian society through the rebirth ceremony in the Temple of Luxor’s birth-room, which initiated the Pharaoh as an intermediary for the gods by being reborn as the son of Amun-Re, in “the rebirth of the sun-god.” This rebirth promoted the fertility of the pharaoh, ensuring his divine right to rule and consolidating his lineage.

The Opet festival also reinforced the fertility of the harvest, which fluctuated depending on the inundation of the Nile, and was therefore celebrated in the “second month of the Akhet season.”

It was not just the Pharaoh who was active during the festival; sailors and soldiers were the most prominent non-religious groups in the festival. They have been observed in the colonnade hall relief-scenes, which demonstrated that a large number of civil and military official partook in the preparations for, and running of, the Opet festival. John Coleman Darnell emphasises the importance of the general population in executing the festival: “Ramesses II listed amongst those responsible for arranging the festival: members of the civil administration, provincial governors, border-officials, heads of internal economic departments, officers of the commissariat, city-officials, and upper ranks of the priesthood.” Those who were not actively involved in the running of the festival were “able to observe from the riverbanks, and at least some may have had limited access to the forepart of the temple.” The festival also provided jobs for wab and lector priests, who were on three-month rotations. They recited spells and hymns among the general population on the riverbank to ensure that reverence was upheld.

== Role of the Pharaoh during the festival ==
“Common people took almost no part in religious rituals; that was the sacred responsibility of the priestly class.” The Pharaoh acted as the intermediary between Egyptian society and the gods during the festival at Luxor Temple, and although “the union of a god with his temple may appear as a sexual union”, the Pharaoh used this link to promote their divine fertility and re-establish their right to rule over Egypt. The Pharaoh’s marriage ceremony to the gods, “a divine marriage, the result of which was the renewal of Amun in the person of his ever-renewing human vessel, the reigning king” ensured that Egypt would be met with another fertile year; through population growth, large harvests, and a large inundation of the Nile. The Pharaoh’s religious role was reinforced through the Opet festival, as it re-affirmed their role as “The first prophet of Amun-Re, king of the gods”, the holiest title in Egypt. The promotion of fertility in the festival strengthened the validity of the Pharaoh’s lineage, as it “celebrated the renewal of the ka-force of Amun, and the transmission of the spirit of kingship in the eternal present”, allowing the Royal Family to maintain power over the social classes. The religious rites during the Opet Festival re-established and confirmed the Pharaoh’s possession of the royal Ka, the representation of the human soul’s lifeforce. “This life force inhabited the bodies of all legitimate pharaohs of Egypt and passed from the old to the new on the latter’s death. An annual confirmation of such a process would help bolster the king’s authority.”

== Archaeological sources ==
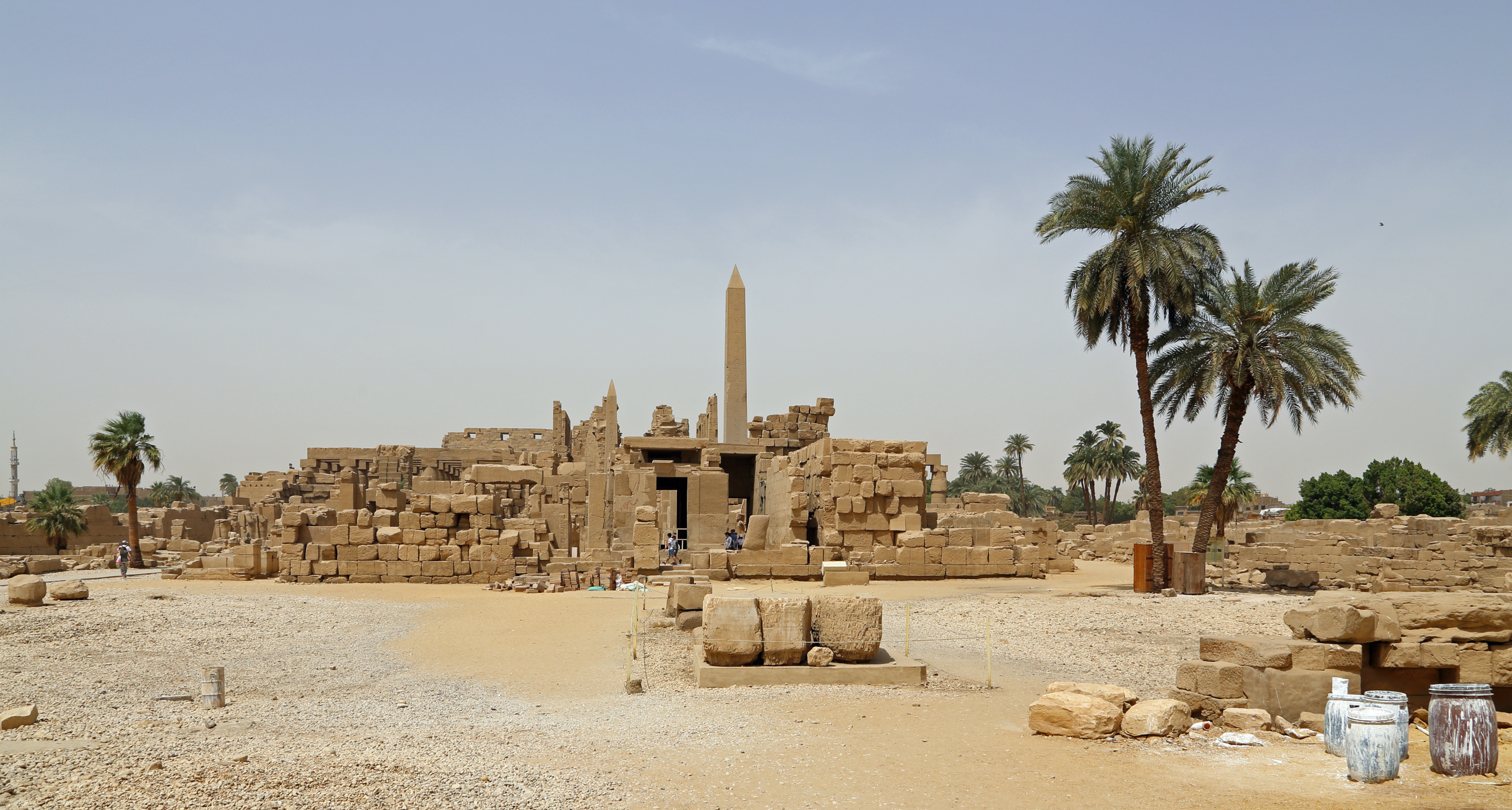
Karnak Temple, where the ritual procession of Amun's barque began

The Karnak (Temple of Amun) and Luxor Temples were the archaeological centrepiece of Thebes, being constructed on “the eastern bank of the Nile” with construction commencing c. 1970 BC by Senusret I and between 1390 and 1352 BC by Amunhotep III (see History of the Karnak Temple complex). Karnak was further expanded by Thutmose I early in the New Kingdom, measuring nearly two square miles. Thebes also provides archaeological sources for the Opet Festival and is “believed to have been an ancient observatory as well as a place of worship where the god Amun would interact directly with the people of earth.” Carvings on the Red Chapel’s south side at Karnak provide the oldest evidence for the festival of Opet. The Chapel was made of grey diorite and red quartzite and housed the ceremonial barque of Amun-Re when not in use.

Sources also provide information on the changing route of the cult statue of Amun-Re. The text on a sphinx of Nectanebo I on the route between Karnak and Luxor describes the construction (refurbishment) of the route for Amun, “so that he might carry out his good navigation in Luxor”, revealing that the basic sense of “navigation” would be the same for the deity traveling within the portable barque, both on the deck of the riverine barge and the shoulders of the priests. John Coleman Darnell believes that using the land route to Luxor was meant to evoke the dry period that preceded the Nile’s annual inundation and that the return to Karnak by river symbolised the onset of the flooding. He also argues that the contrasting land and water journeys symbolised the perilous journey which the sun was meant to take through “the dry realms of the Land of Sokar” (the underworld) each night.

Egyptologist Marina Escolano-Poveda outlined the importance of a relief in the Red Chapel of Hatshepsut in depicting the celebratory nature of the festival, “The reliefs make a great effort to depict the grand spectacle: many priests support the barks and statues, while a crowd makes a joyous din with sistrum rattles. The gods’ barks were brought alongside the jetty at the Temple of Luxor and were carried on the shoulders of the priests to the sacred precinct. A series of ceremonies were conducted in the outer courts, after which the barks were taken into the inner sanctuary, accompanied solely by high-ranking priests and the pharaoh. Once the ceremonies were completed, the barks returned downstream to Karnak.”

== Revival ==
On November 25, 2021, after a long renovation project, the Avenue of Sphinxes was re-opened in a grand ceremony similar to the Opet Festival. On December 7, 2021, the Ministry of Tourism and Antiquities announced that the ceremony would be held annually.

== See also ==
- History of the Karnak Temple complex
- Shemu
