= Festival Hall of Thutmose III =

Ancient shrine in Luxor, Egypt

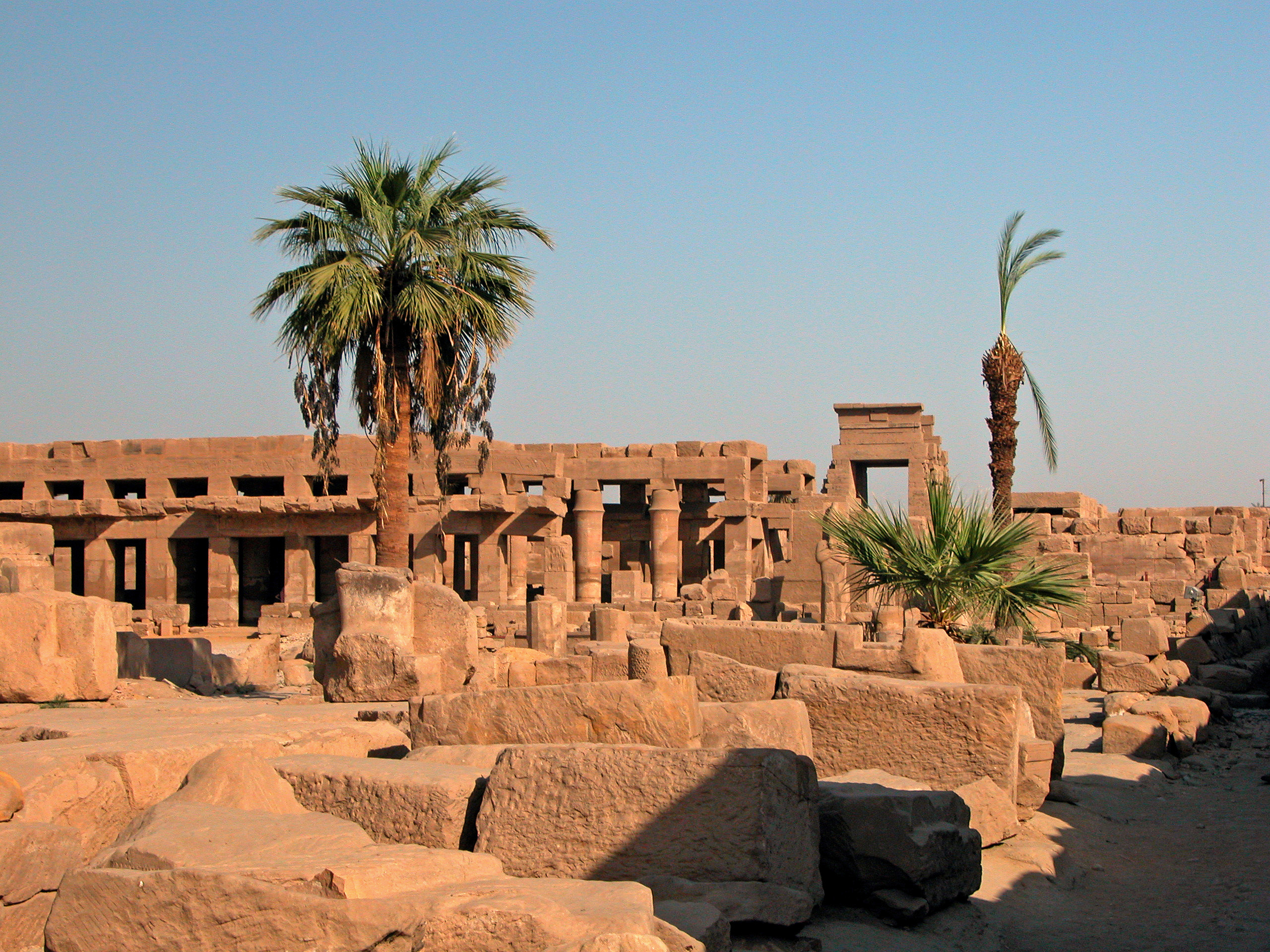
- Columns of the Festival Hall
- 25.71874°N 32.6574°E
- Type: Shrine
- Location: Luxor, Luxor Governorate, Egypt

History
- Built: c. 1440 BC

The Festival Hall of Thutmose III (Akh-menu) is an ancient shrine in Luxor (Thebes), Egypt. It is located at the heart of the Precinct of Amun-Re, in the Karnak Temple Complex. The edifice is normally translated as "the most glorious of monuments", but "monument to living spirit" is an alternative translation since akh can mean either glory or blessed/living spirit (For instance, Akhenaten is often translated as "living spirit of Aten").

The Festival Hall of Thutmose III is situated at the end of the Middle Kingdom court, with its axis at right-angles to the main east–west axis of the temple. It was originally built to celebrate the jubilee (Heb-Sed) of the 18th Dynasty pharaoh Thutmose III, and later became used as part of the annual Opet Festival. It is seemingly decorated to echo a huge tent shrine, complete with awnings and tent poles. Located in this temple, the Karnak king list shows Thutmose III with some of the earlier kings that built parts of the temple complex.

== Layout ==
Built at the eastern end of Karnak's main axis, and enclosed in its own walls, this building is little understood and its exact purpose is still unclear. It consists of three main parts, a suite of rooms dedicated to Sokar to the south-east, a solar complex to the north-east and the festival hall itself, from which the other areas of the building can be reached. This is known as the 'Hry-ib', or that which is at the heart of it. The only original entrance was in the south-west corner. The walls contain the Botanical garden of Thutmose III.

=== Main hall ===
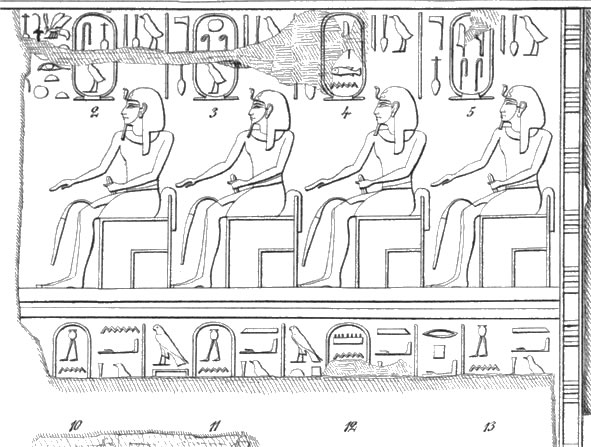
The Chamber of Ancestors, drawn by Karl Lepsius

In a small room off of the main hall, there is a room referred to as the Chamber of Ancestors, where a large inscription, the Karnak king list, shows Thutmose III making offerings to his 61 ancestors. The originals of these were removed and are now located in the Louve Museum in Paris.

== See also ==
- List of lists of ancient kings
