= Luxor Temple =

Ancient Egyptian temple

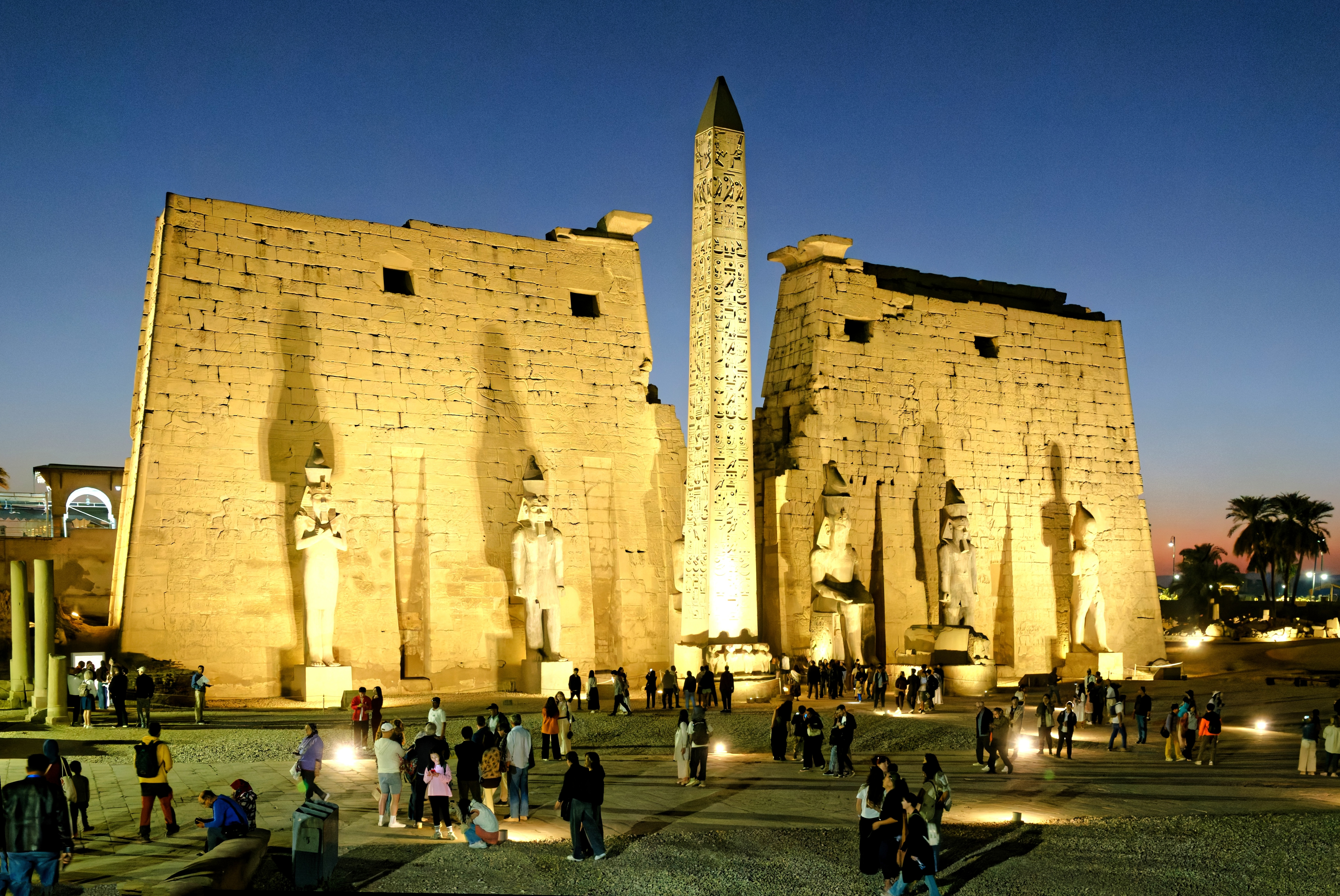
- The temple in 2025

- Location in Egypt
- 25°42′0″N 32°38′21″E
- Type: Temple
- Location: Luxor, Luxor Governorate, Egypt

History
- Built: c. 1400 BC

Site notes
- Material: Sandstone

UNESCO World Heritage Site
- Official name: Temple of Luxor
- Part of: Ancient Thebes with its Necropolis
- Criteria: Cultural: (i), (iii), (vi)
- Reference: 87-002
- Inscription: 1979 (3rd Session)
- Area: 7,390.16 ha (28.5336 sq mi)
- Buffer zone: 443.55 ha (1.7126 sq mi)

The Luxor Temple (Arabic: معبد الأقصر) is a large Ancient Egyptian temple complex located on the east bank of the Nile River in the city of Luxor (ancient Thebes) and was constructed around 1400 BC. In Egyptian it was known as ipet resyt, "the southern sanctuary". It was one of the two primary temples on the east bank, the other being Karnak.

Unlike the other temples in Thebes, Luxor temple is not dedicated to a cult god or a deified version of the pharaoh in death. Instead, Luxor temple is dedicated to the rejuvenation of kingship; it may have been where many of the pharaohs of Egypt were crowned in reality or conceptually (as in the case of Alexander the Great, who claimed he was crowned at Luxor but may never have traveled south of Memphis, near modern Cairo).

To the rear of the temple are chapels built by Amenhotep III of the 18th Dynasty, and Alexander. Other parts of the temple were built by Tutankhamun and Ramesses II. During the Roman era, the temple and its surroundings were a legionary fortress and the home of the Roman government in the area. During the Roman period a chapel inside the Luxor Temple originally dedicated to the goddess Mut was transformed into a Tetrarchy cult chapel and later into a church.

Along with the other archaeological sites in Thebes, the Luxor Temple was inscribed on the UNESCO World Heritage List in 1979.

== Construction ==
The original two obelisks, as seen in 1832. The one on the right is now in Paris, known as the Luxor Obelisk.

The Luxor Temple was built with sandstone from the Gebel el-Silsila area, which is located in South-Western Egypt. This sandstone is referred to as Nubian sandstone. It was used for the construction of monuments in Upper Egypt as well as in the course of past and current restoration works.

Like other Egyptian structures, a common technique used was symbolism, or illusionism. For example, to the Egyptian, a sanctuary shaped like an Anubis jackal was really Anubis. At the Luxor Temple, the two obelisks (the smaller one closer to the west is now at the Place de la Concorde in Paris) flanking the entrance were not the same height, but they created the illusion that they were. With the layout of the temple they appear to be of equal height, but using illusionism, it enhances the relative distances hence making them look the same size to the wall behind it. Symbolically, it is a visual and spatial effect to emphasize the heights and distance from the wall, enhancing the already existing pathway.

== Excavation ==
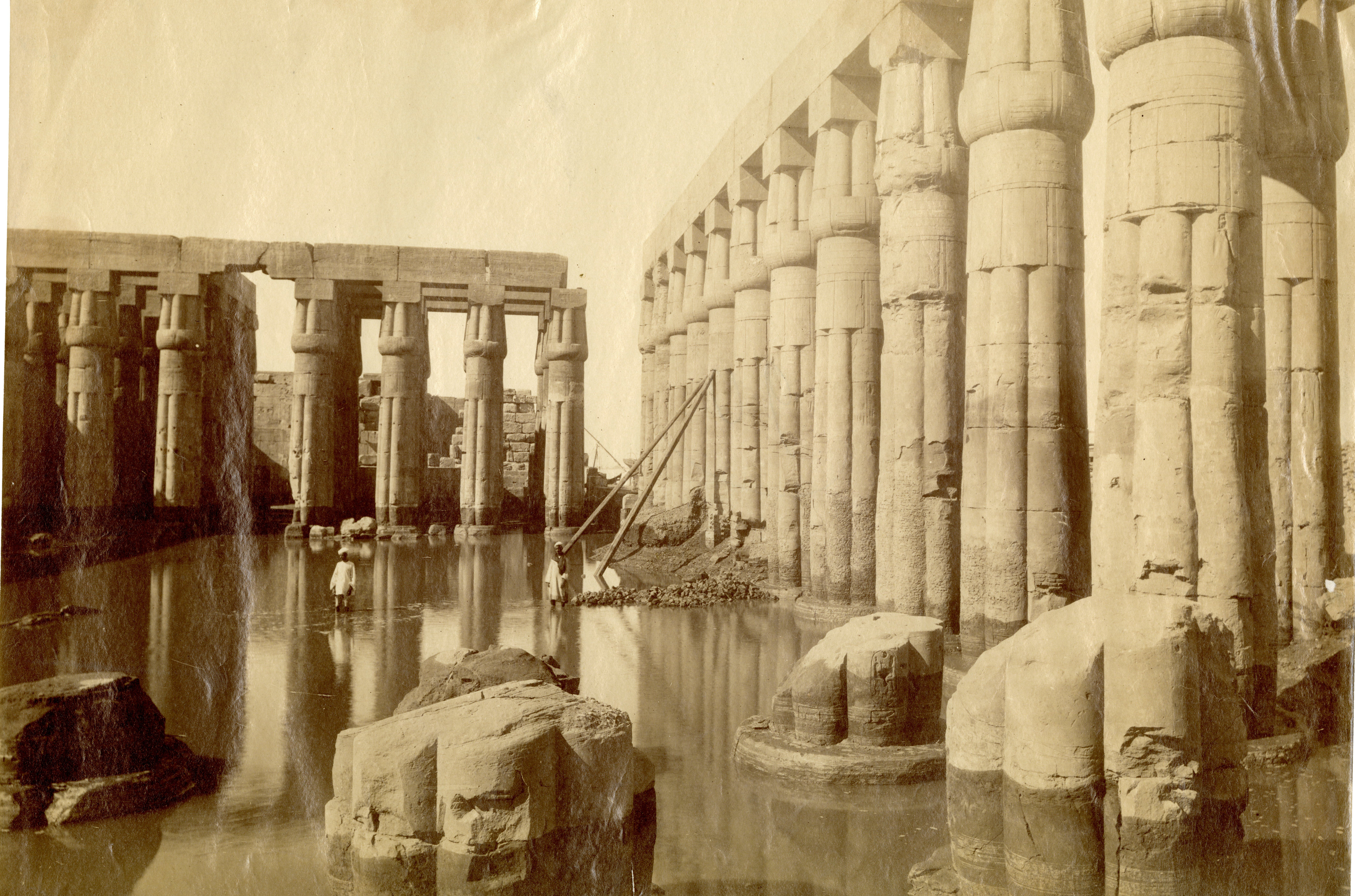
1870-1888 view of the ruins of the colonnade of the forecourt of Amenhotep III in the temple complex of Amun at Luxor, inundated during a flood of the Nile River.

From the Middle Ages, the population of Luxor had settled in and around the temple, at the southward end of the mount. Due to this, centuries of rubble had accumulated, to the point where there was an artificial hill some 14.5 to 15 metres (48 to 49 ft) in height. The Luxor Temple had begun to be excavated by Professor Gaston Maspero after 1884, once he had been given permission to commence operations. The excavations were sporadic until 1960. Over time, accumulated rubbish of the ages had buried three quarters of the temple which contained the courts and colonnades which formed the nucleus of the Arab half of the modern village. Maspero had taken an interest earlier, and he had obtained the post of Mariette Pasha to complete the job in 1881. Not only was there rubbish, but there were also barracks, stores, houses, huts, pigeon towers, which needed to be removed in order to excavate the site. (There still exists a working mosque within the temple which was never removed.) Maspero received from the Egyptian minister of public works the authorization needed to obtain funds in order to negotiate compensation for the pieces of land covered by the houses and dependencies.

== Festivals ==
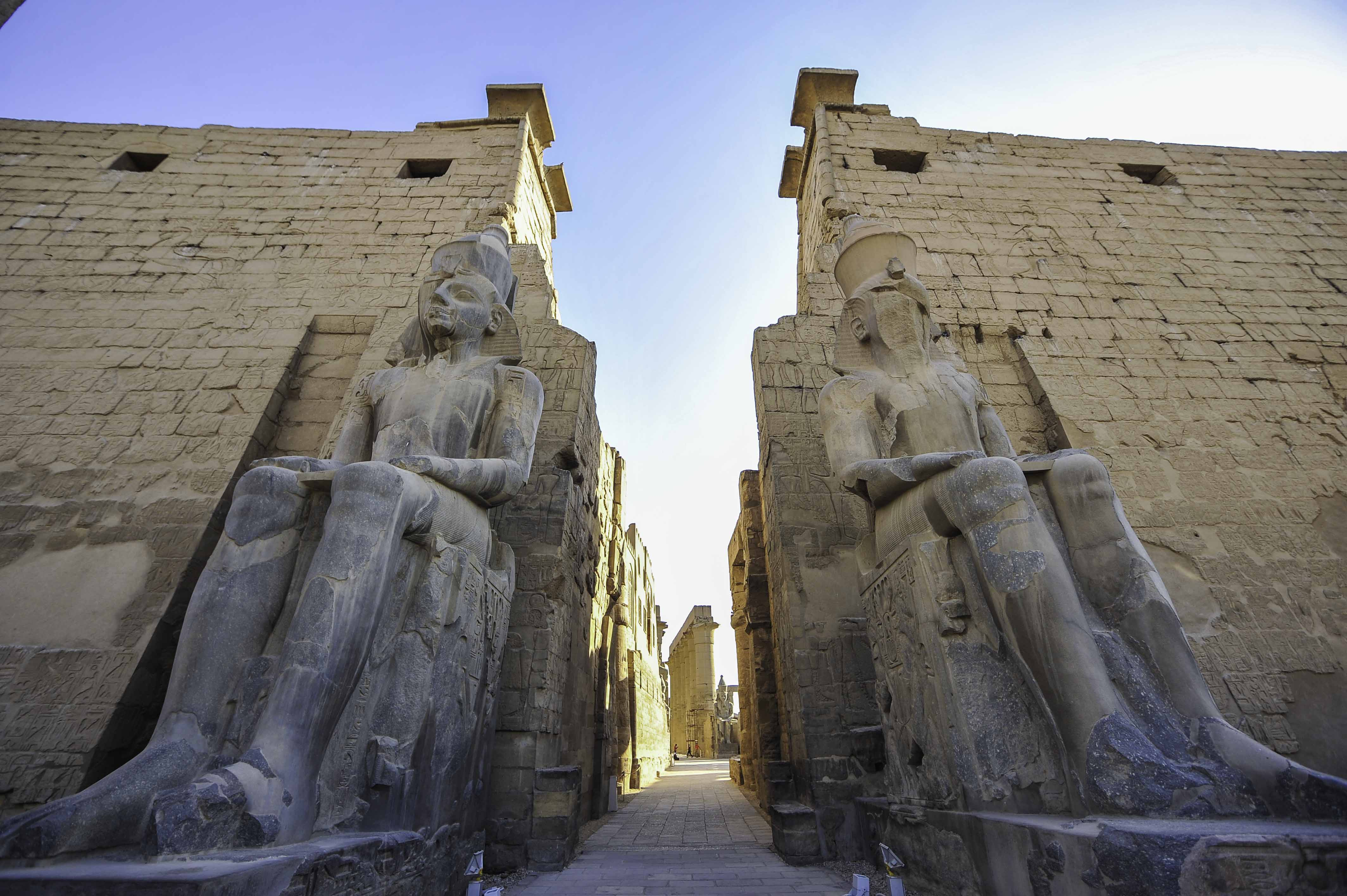
Statues of Ramesses II at the entrance through the first Pylon of Luxor Temple

The Luxor Temple was built during the New Kingdom and dedicated to the Theban Triad consisted of Amun, his consort Mut, and their son Khonsu. The focus of the annual Opet Festival, in which a cult statue of Amun was paraded down the Nile from nearby Karnak Temple (ipet-sut) to stay there for a while with his consort Mut, was to promote the fertility of Amun-Re and the Pharaoh. However, other studies at the temple by the Epigraphic Survey team present a completely new interpretation of Luxor and its great annual festival (the Feast of Opet). They have concluded that Luxor is the temple dedicated to the divine Egyptian ruler or, more precisely, to the cult of the Royal Ka. Examples of the cult of the Royal Ka can be seen with the colossal seated figures of the deified Ramesses II before the Pylon and at the entrance to the Grand colonnade are clearly Ka-statues, cult statues of the king as embodiment of the royal Ka.

== Avenue of Sphinxes and Shrine stations ==
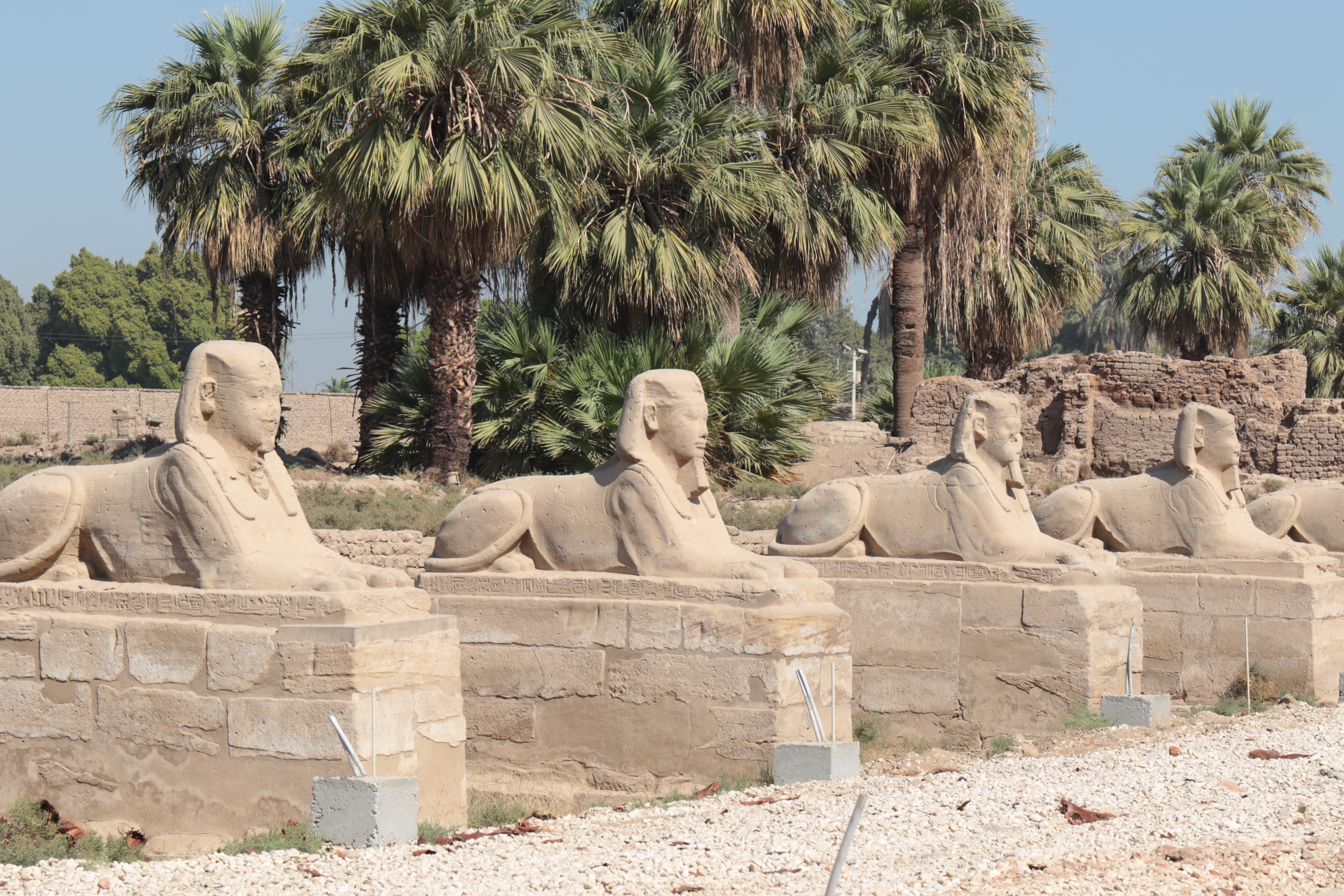
Luxor's Avenue of Sphinxes, an avenue of human headed sphinxes which once connected the temples of Karnak and Luxor

The avenue (known as wi.t ntr "path of god"; طريق الكباش) which went in a straight line for about 2.7 kilometres (1.7 mi) between the Luxor Temple and the Karnak area was lined with human-headed sphinxes; in ancient times it is probable that these replaced earlier sphinxes which may have had different heads. Six barque shrines, serving as way stations for the barques of the gods during festival processions, were set up on the avenue between the Karnak and Luxor Temple. Along the avenue the stations were set up for ceremonies such as the Feast of Opet which held significance to the temple. Each station had a purpose, for example the fourth station was the station of Kamare, which cooled the oar of Amun. The Fifth station of Kamare was the station which received the beauty of Amun. Lastly the Sixth Station of Kamare was a shrine for Amun, Holy of Steps.

A small mudbrick shrine was built in the courtyard of Nectanebo I in 126 and was dedicated to Serapis and Isis; it was presented to Roman Emperor Hadrian on his birthday.

== Abu Haggag Mosque ==
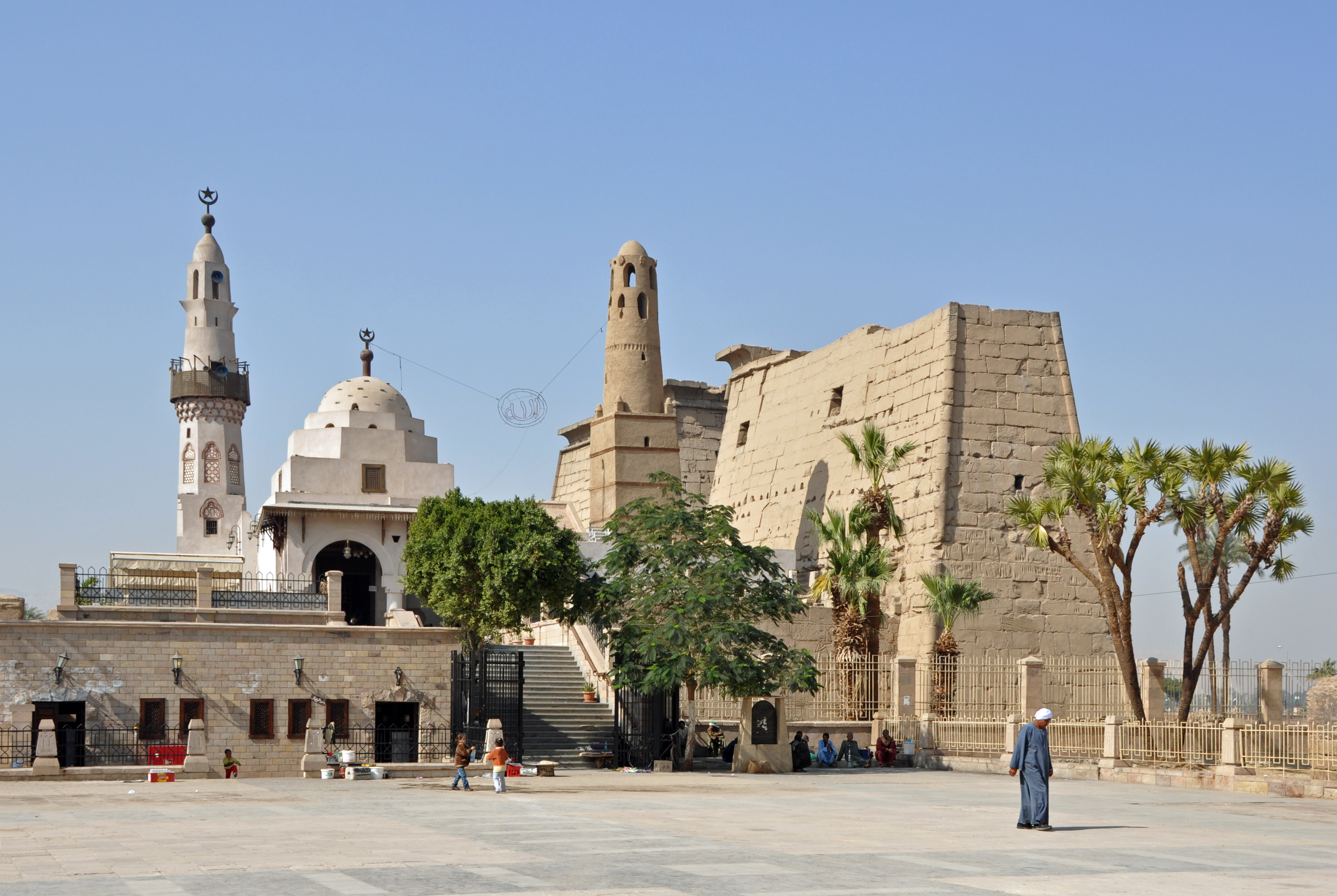
The Abu Haggag Mosque seen from the east

The active Abu Haggag Mosque (مسجد أبو الحجاج بالأقصر) is located within the temple, standing on the ancient columns themselves. That part of the Luxor Temple was converted to a church by the Romans in 395, and then to a mosque around 640, which is more than 3,400 years of continuous religious worship.

== Defacement ==
In 2013, a Chinese student posted a picture of engraved writing that read "Ding Jinhao was here" (Chinese: 丁锦昊到此一游) in Chinese on a sculpture. This discovery spurred debate about increased tourism after the media confirmed a Chinese student caused this and other defacements. The graffiti has since been partially cleared.

== Gallery ==
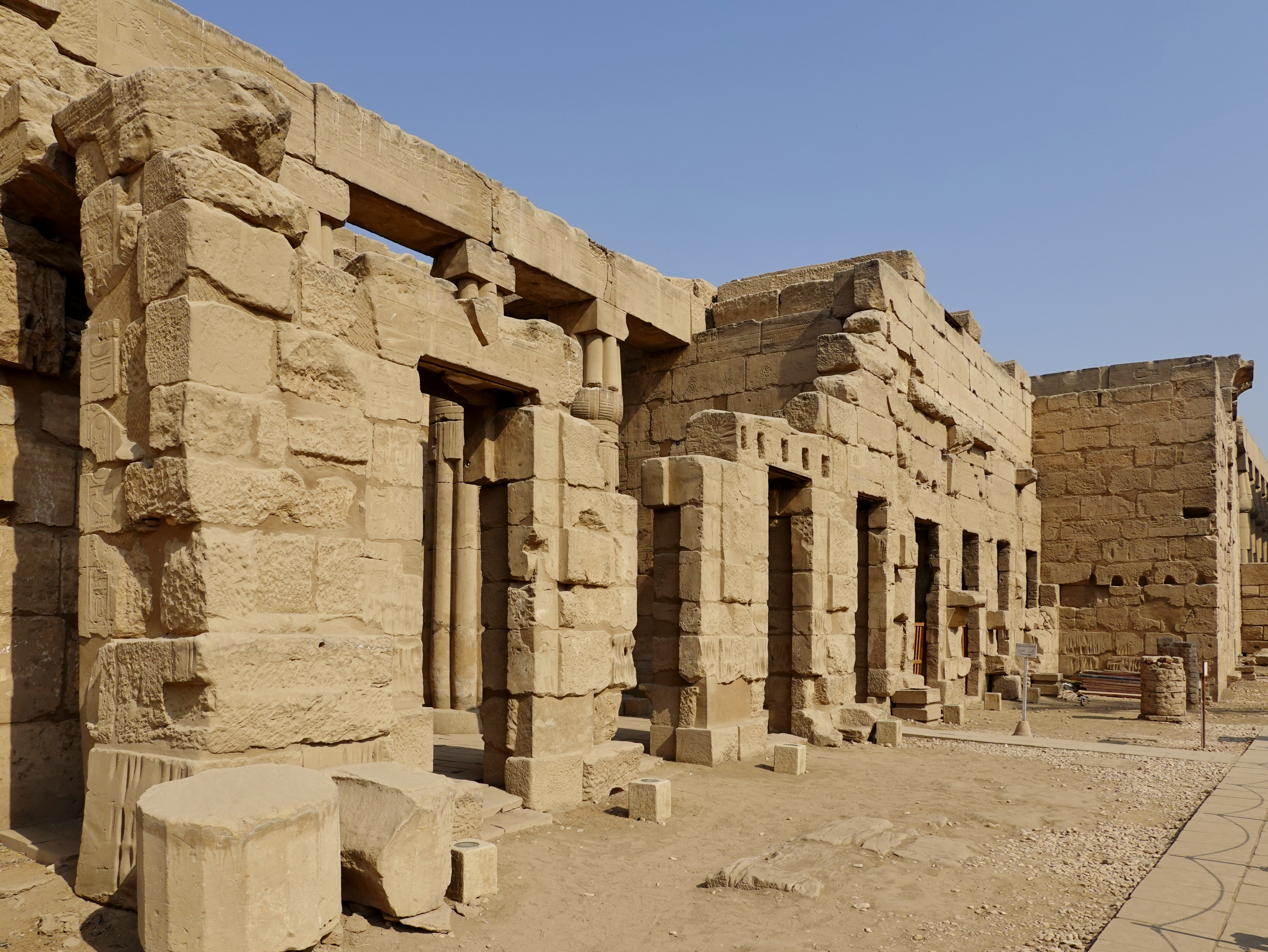
Sanctuary of Luxor Temple

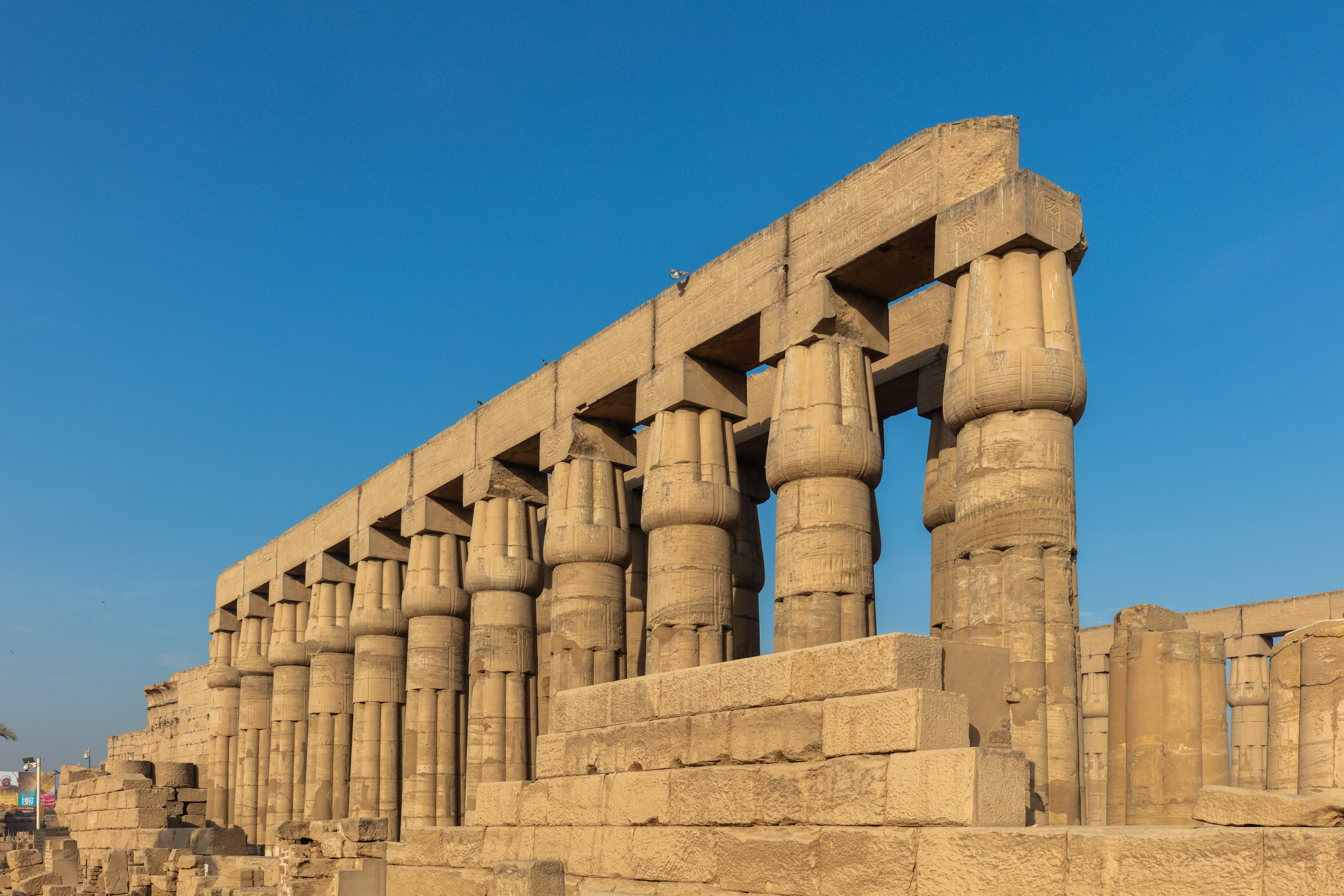
Sun court of Amenhotep III

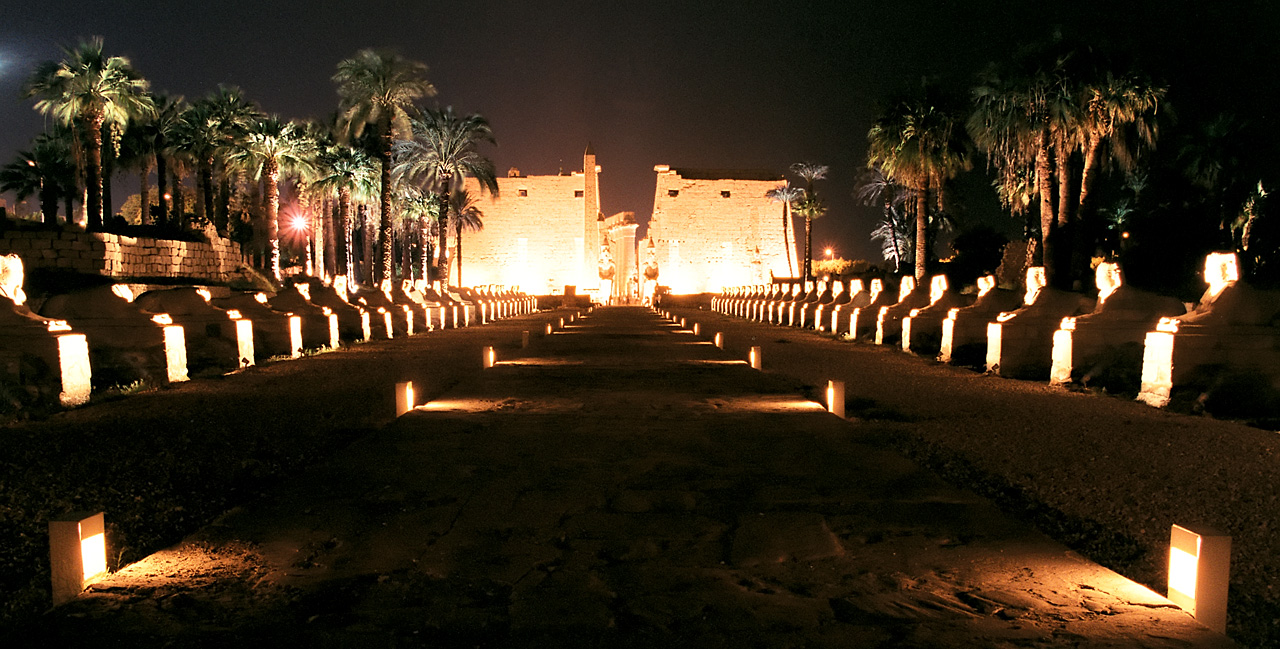
The Avenue of Sphinxes at night

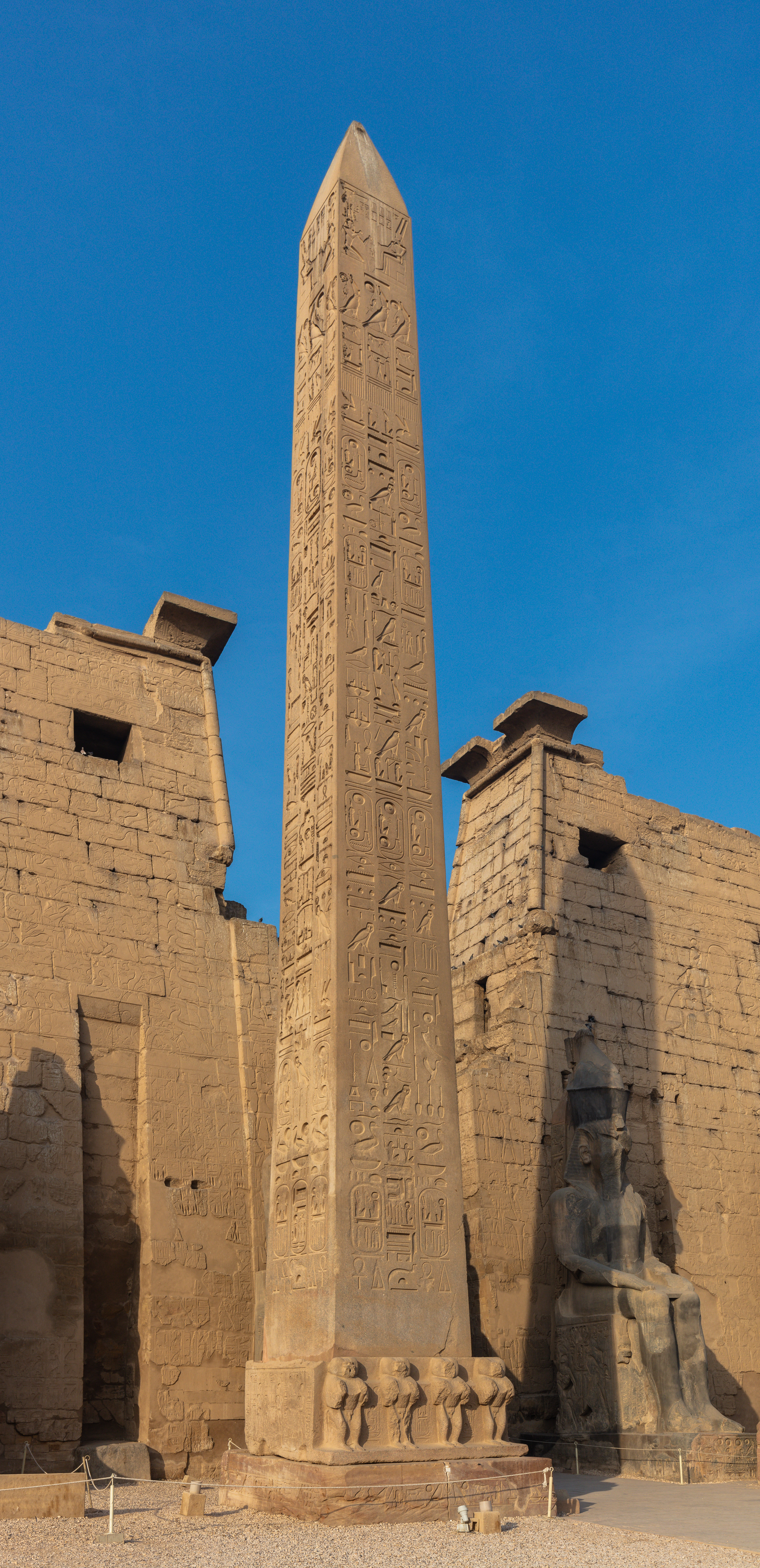
Pylon and Obelisk of Ramesses II

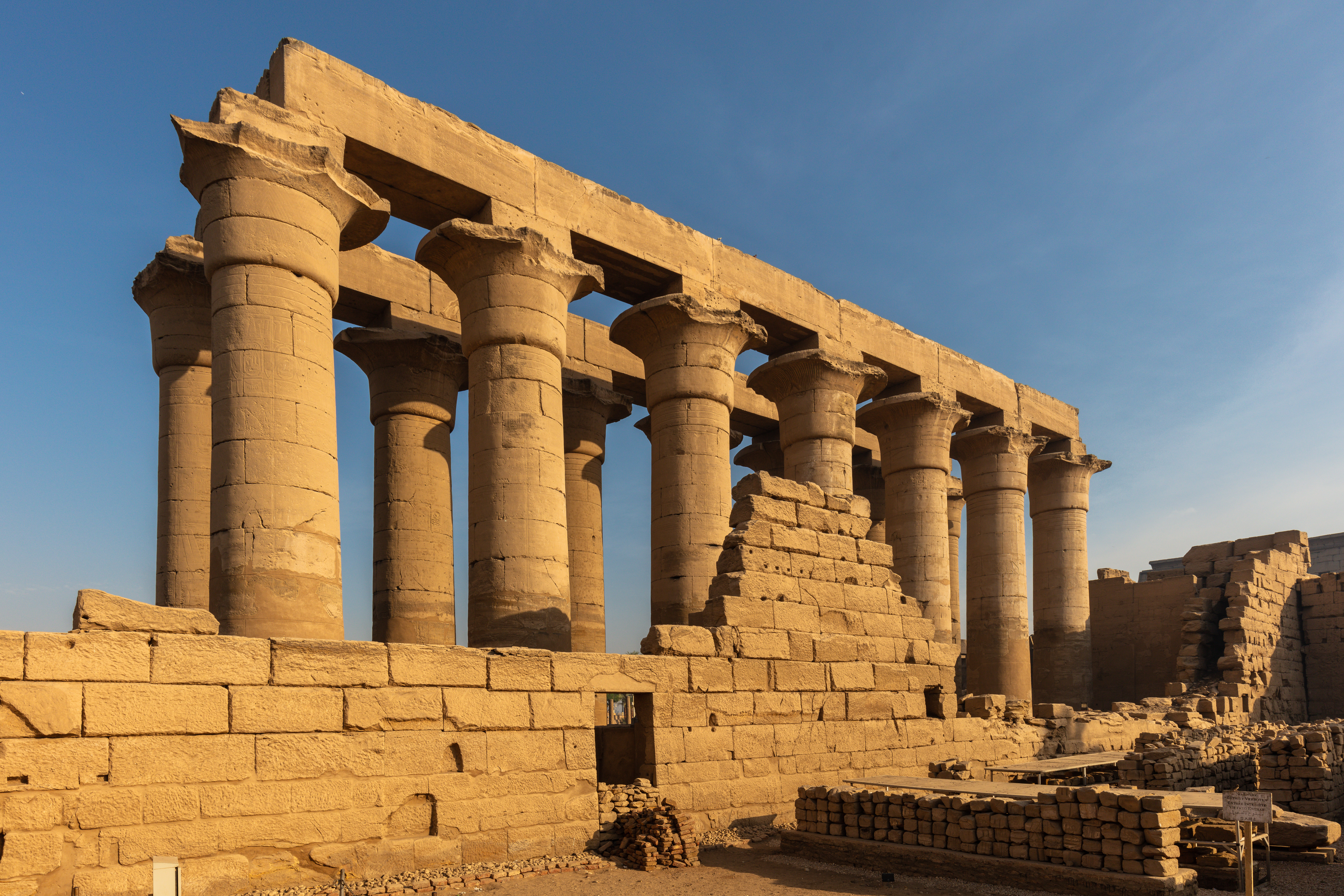
The Grand Colonnade

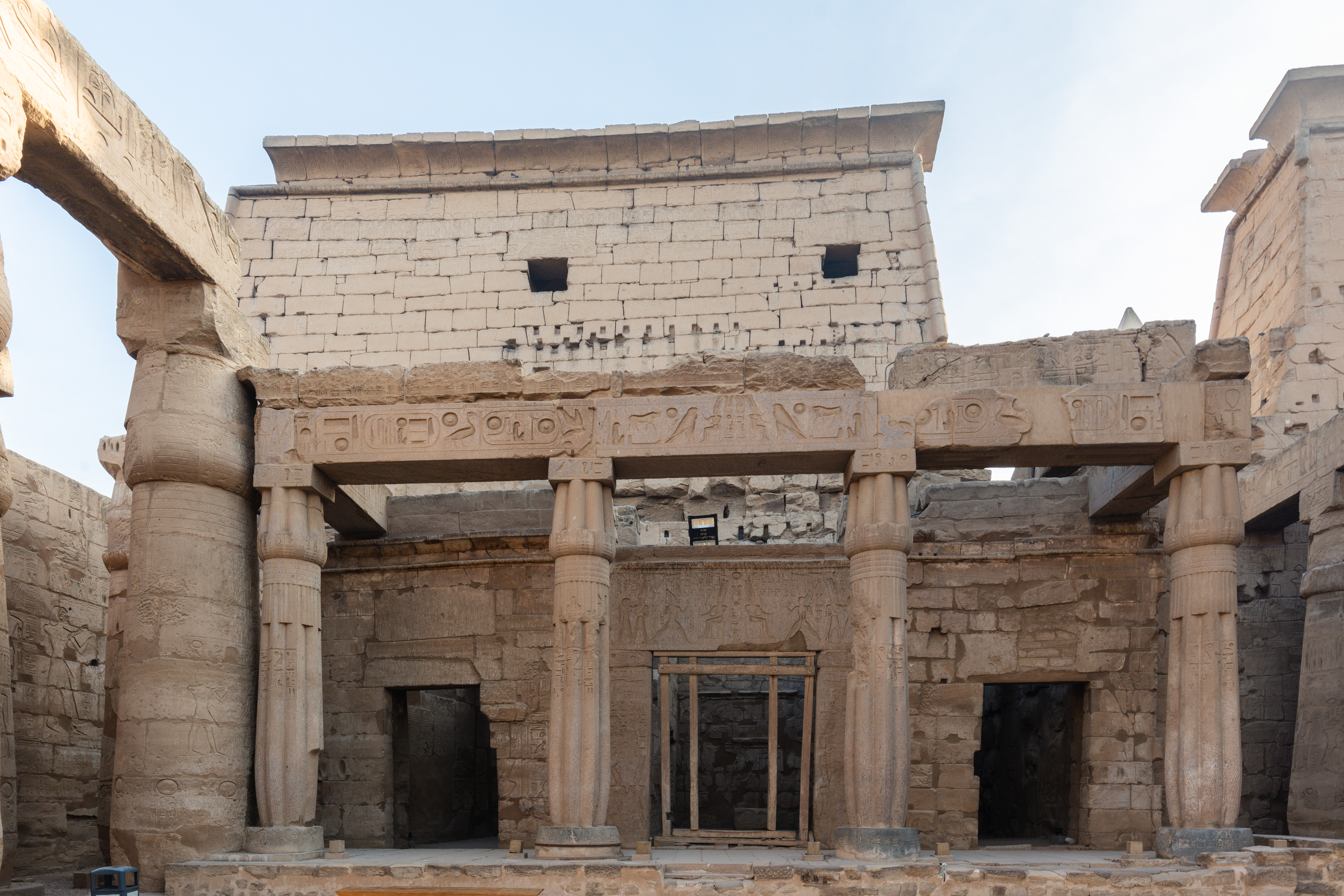
Barque Shrine of Theban Triad

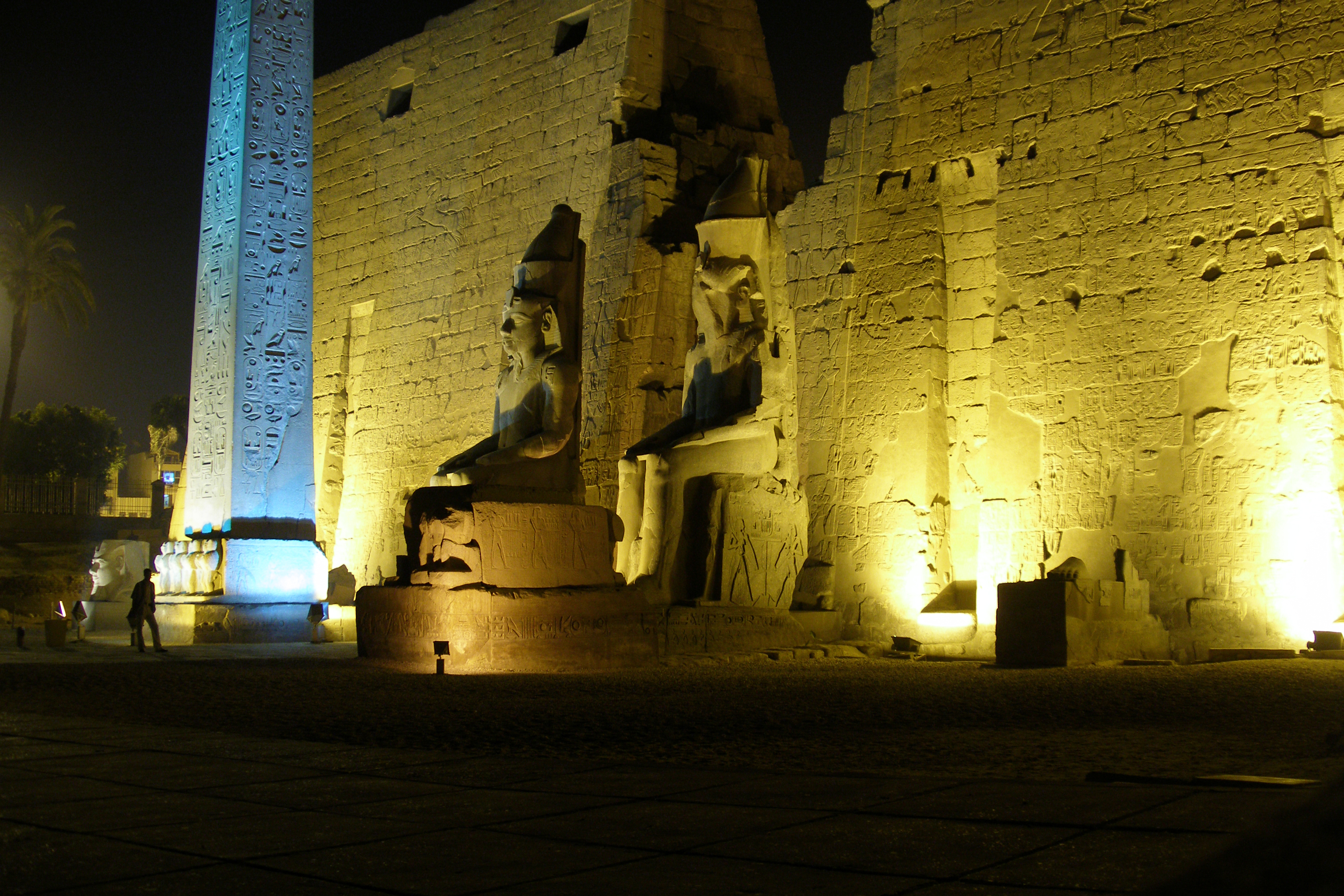
First pylon at night

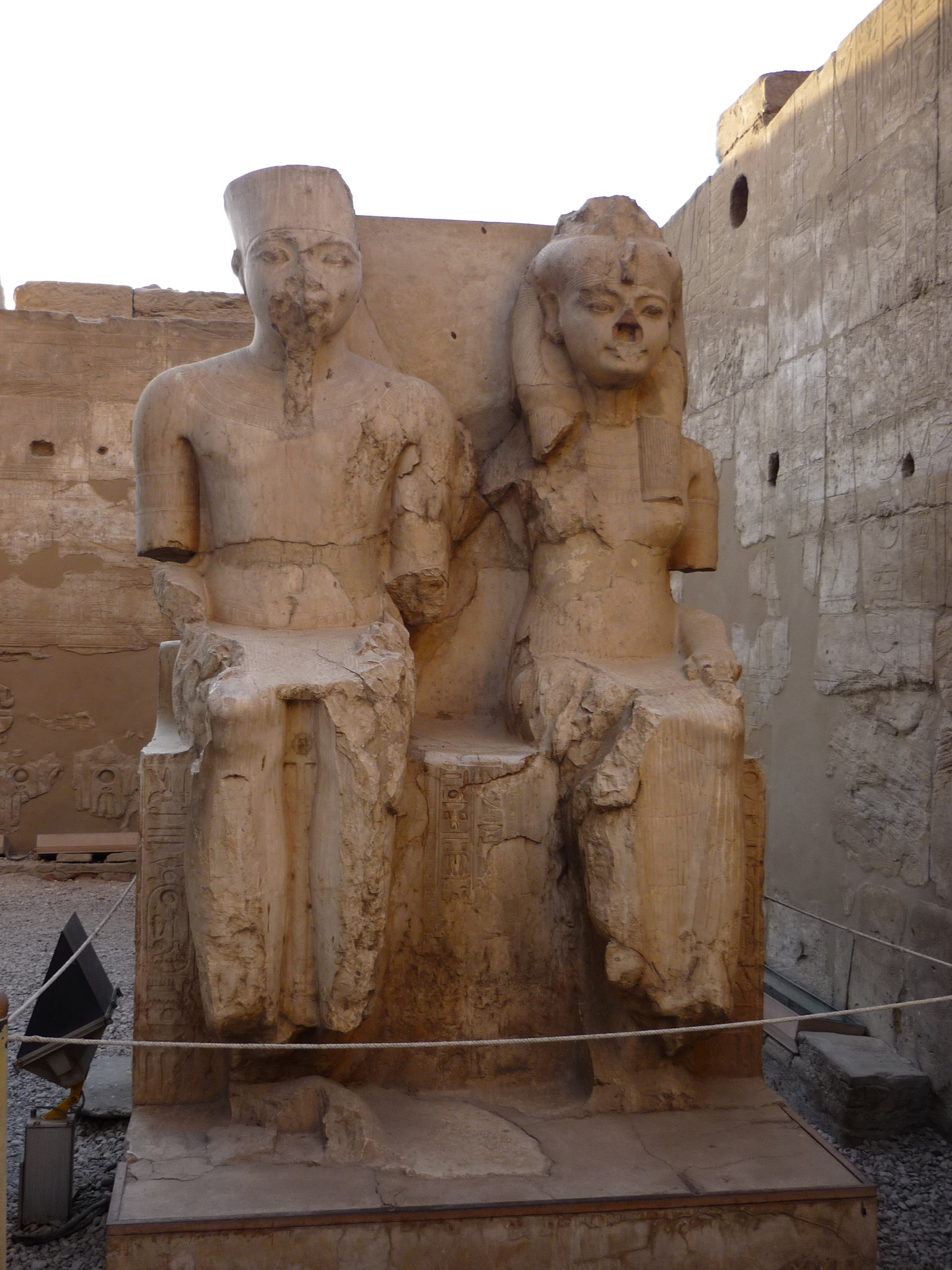
A double statue of Amun and Mut with the facial features of Tutankhamun and Ankhesenamun, respectively

== See also ==
- Temple of Khonsu
- Luxor Museum
