= Abu Haggag Mosque =

Mosque in Luxor, Egypt

- مسجد أبو الحجاج بالأقصر
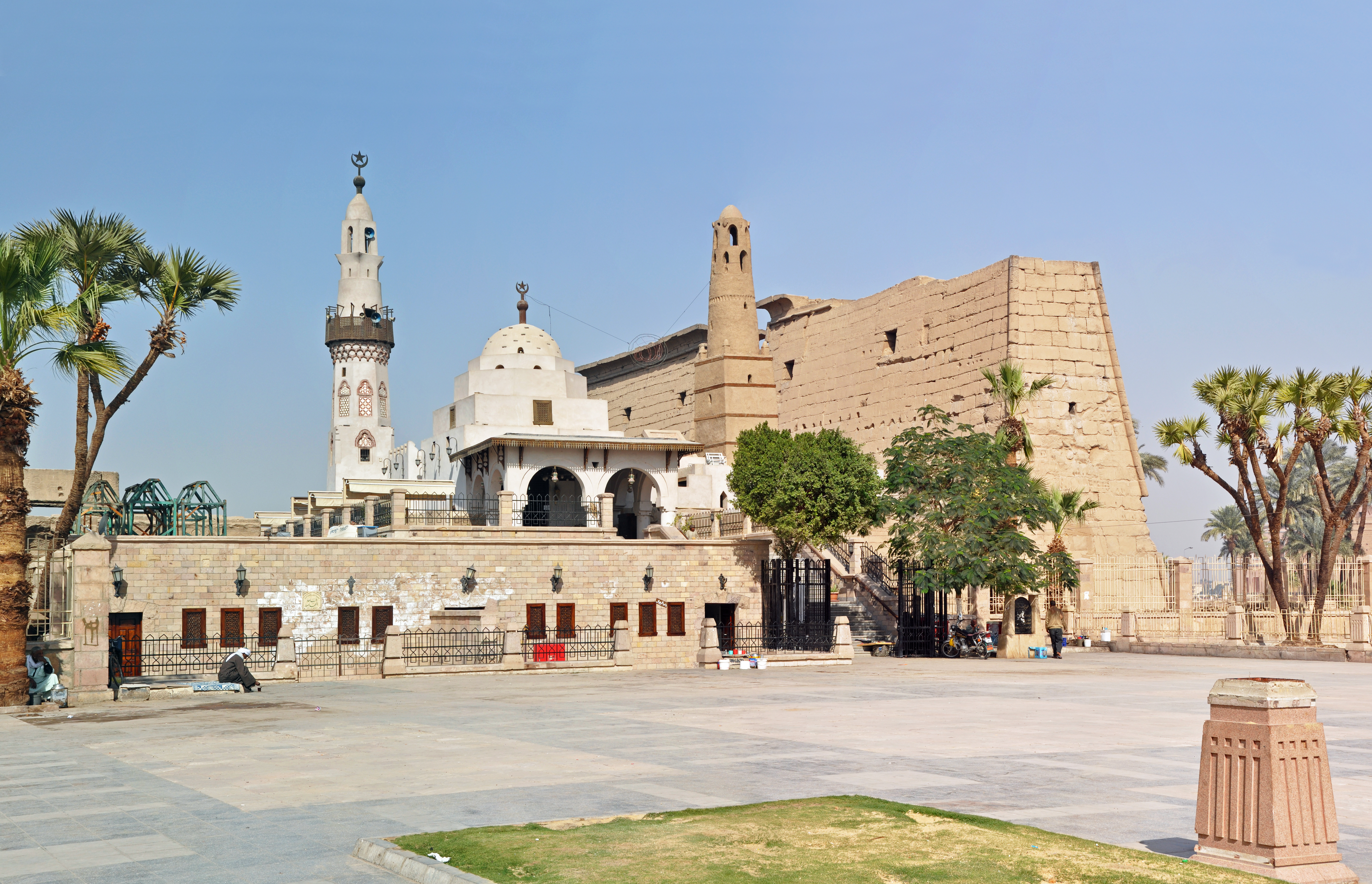

- Location within Egypt

Religion
- Affiliation: Islam
- Festival: Mawlid
- Ecclesiastical or organizational status: Mosque
- Patron: Yusuf Abu al-Haggag
- Status: Active

Location
- Location: Luxor Temple, Luxor, Luxor Governorate
- Country: Egypt
- Interactive map of Abu Haggag Mosque
- Coordinates: 25°42′00″N 32°38′22″E

Architecture
- Type: Mosque
- Style: Fatimid; Ayyubid
- Founder: As-Salih Ayyub
- Completed: 13th century CE; 2009 (renovations)

Specifications
- Dome: 1
- Minaret: 2
- Temple: 1 (built within temple compound)
- Shrine: 1: (Yusuf Abu al-Haggag)
- Materials: Mud brick

The Abu Haggag Mosque (Arabic: مسجد أبو الحجاج بالأقصر) (Note: Sometimes written as the Mosque of Abu Haggag.) is a mosque in Luxor, in the Luxor Governorate of Egypt. The mosque contains the tomb of Sheikh Yusuf Abu al-Haggag, after whom the mosque is named. The mosque is integrated into the structure of Luxor Temple, an Ancient Egyptian centre of worship, making it one of the oldest continuously used temples in the world, dating from the reign of Pharaoh Amenhotep III in the 14th century BCE.

== History ==
The mosque was built during the Ayyubid era of Egypt, specifically during the reign of As-Salih Najm al-Din Ayyub. It was built on the site of a demolished basilica located within the premises of the Luxor Temple.

In 2009, the mosque underwent restoration efforts. It took two years under the supervision of the Supreme Council of Antiquities and cost E£7 million. The new architecture included expanding the prayer square, strengthening the dome, and changing the ceilings, after the mosque was exposed to a fire in June 2007, and during that restoration. During construction, columns and lintels appeared bearing ancient Egyptian writings from the time of Pharaoh Ramesses II.

== Architecture ==
The mosque stands within the court of Ramesses II. This part of the Luxor Temple was converted to a basilica by the Coptic Christians in 395 CE, and then to a mosque in 640 CE. The site therefore has seen more than 3,400 years of continuous religious use, making the Luxor Temple the world's oldest building in active use, at least in part, for purposes other than archeological or tourist use.

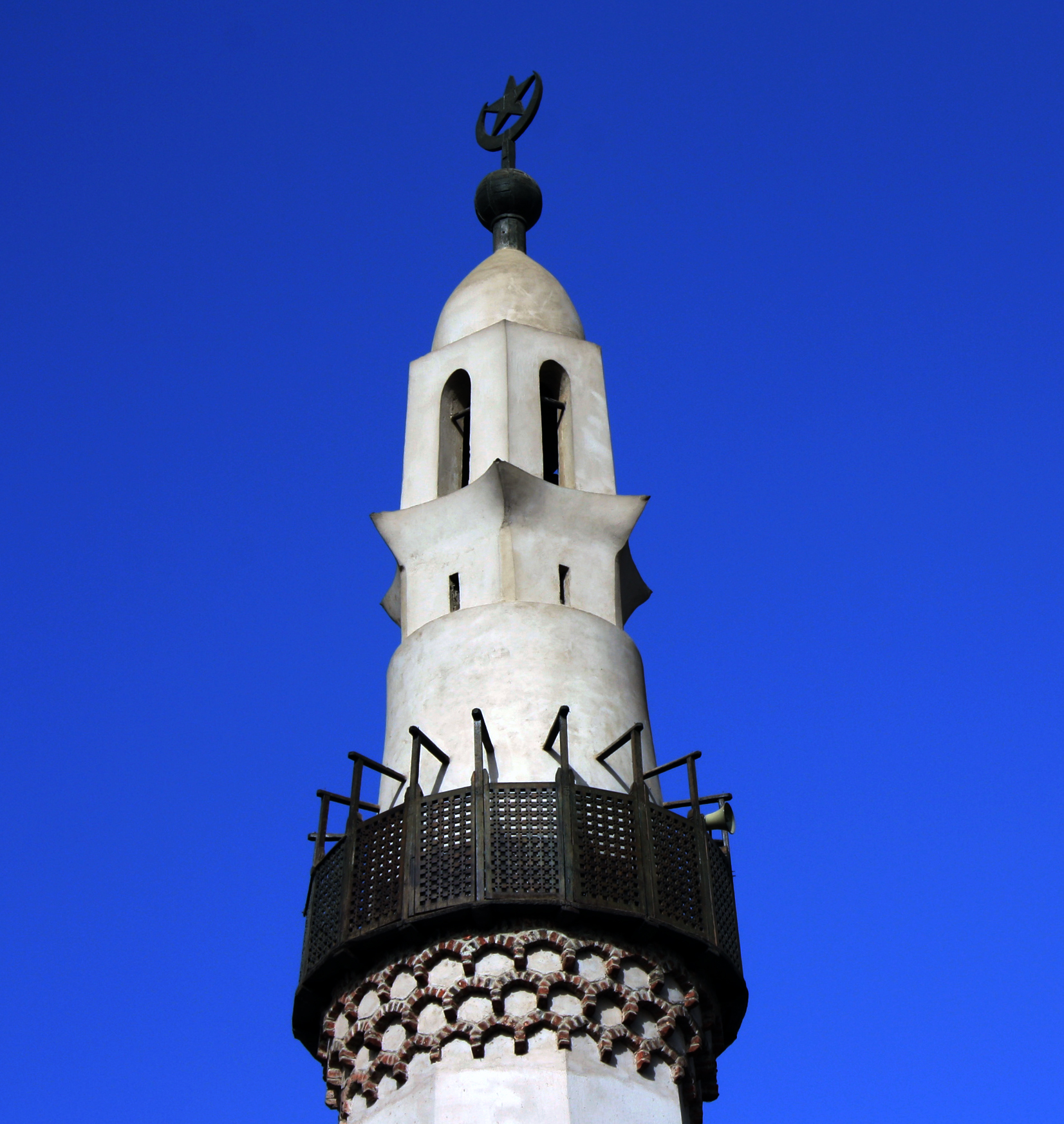
One of the mosque's two minarets.

The mosque has two minarets, made out of mud brick. The minarets are one of the oldest components of the current mosque. The older one consists of three floors; the first is square in shape, the second and third are cylindrical, and at the top is a group of windows and openings, and the square bottom part is reinforced with wooden columns.

The tomb of Yusuf Abu al-Hajjaj is located under the dome of the mosque. The ceiling of this tomb chamber is composed of a base of irregular dimensions, which descends until it reaches the circular shape of the dome.

== Mawlid celebration ==
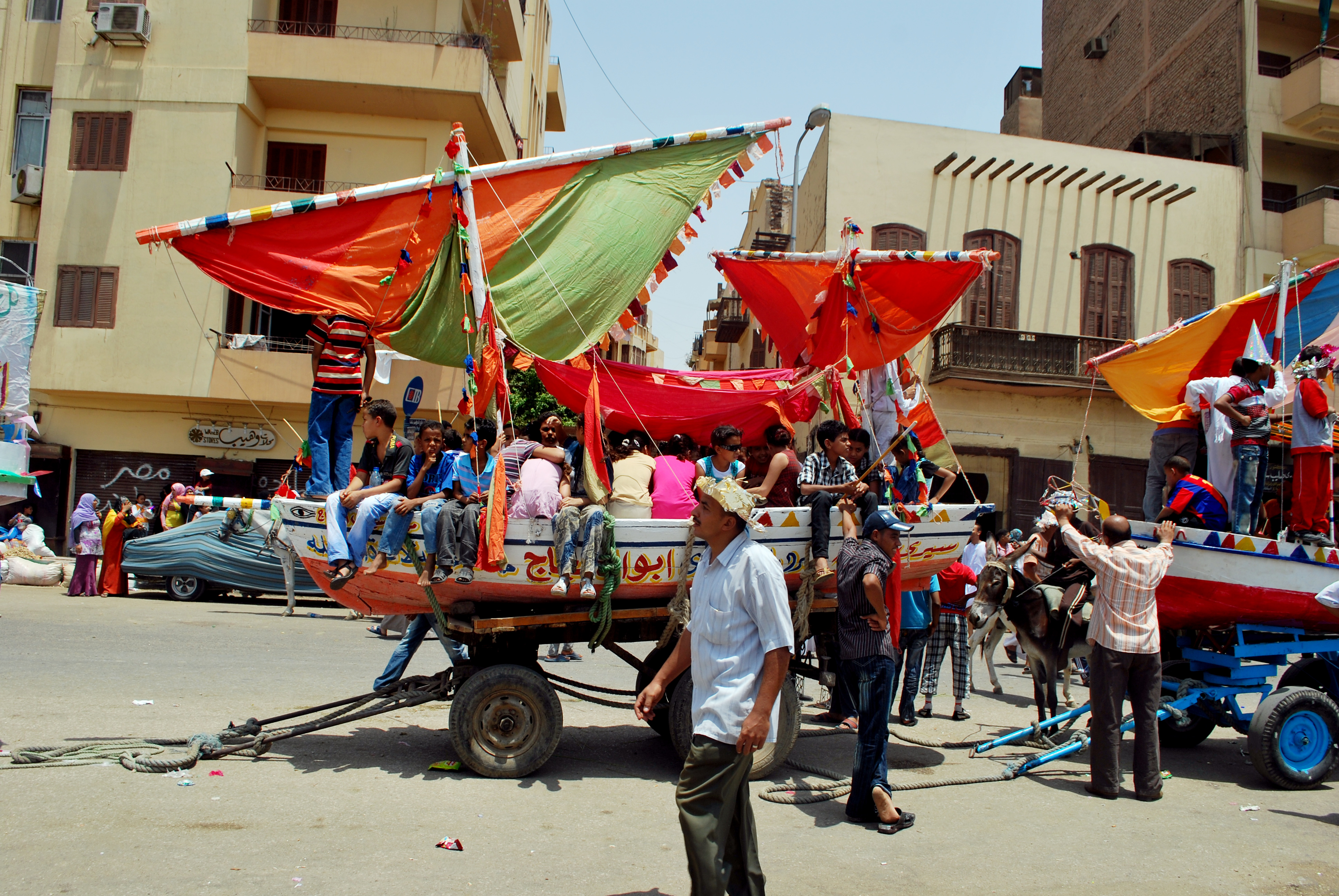
Boats paraded around the mosque during the Mawlid celebration.

The annual birthday celebration, or Mawlid, of Yusuf Abu el-Haggag is celebrated in the mosque. (Note: The birthday is known in Arabic as ‘Mawlid Abu al-Hajjaj al-Uqṣūrī’.) The celebration culminates 15 days before Ramadan and attracts large numbers of pilgrims. During this festival, a procession of boats parade around the temple, typically carried by the descendants of el-Haggag. These boats symbolise el-Haggag’s journey to Egypt. Residents of Luxor dress up in colourful outfits and attend the mawlid festival for three days. Activities of the festival often include horse races, performances of sufi music, stick fights and boat rides. Inside the mosque, the descendants of el-Haggag hold a council known as Al-Dayem, raise religious chanting, sing prophetic praises and read the Qur’an.

The celebrations bear a resemblance to Pharaonic rituals, being strongly reminiscent of the Opet. Ahmed Abu Haggag, an organiser of the event, has stated: “The mawlid celebrations feature ancient rituals and customs that are greatly intertwined with the pharaonic festivals”. The celebration is habitually attended by those who hold significant governmental positions in Luxor.

== Gallery ==
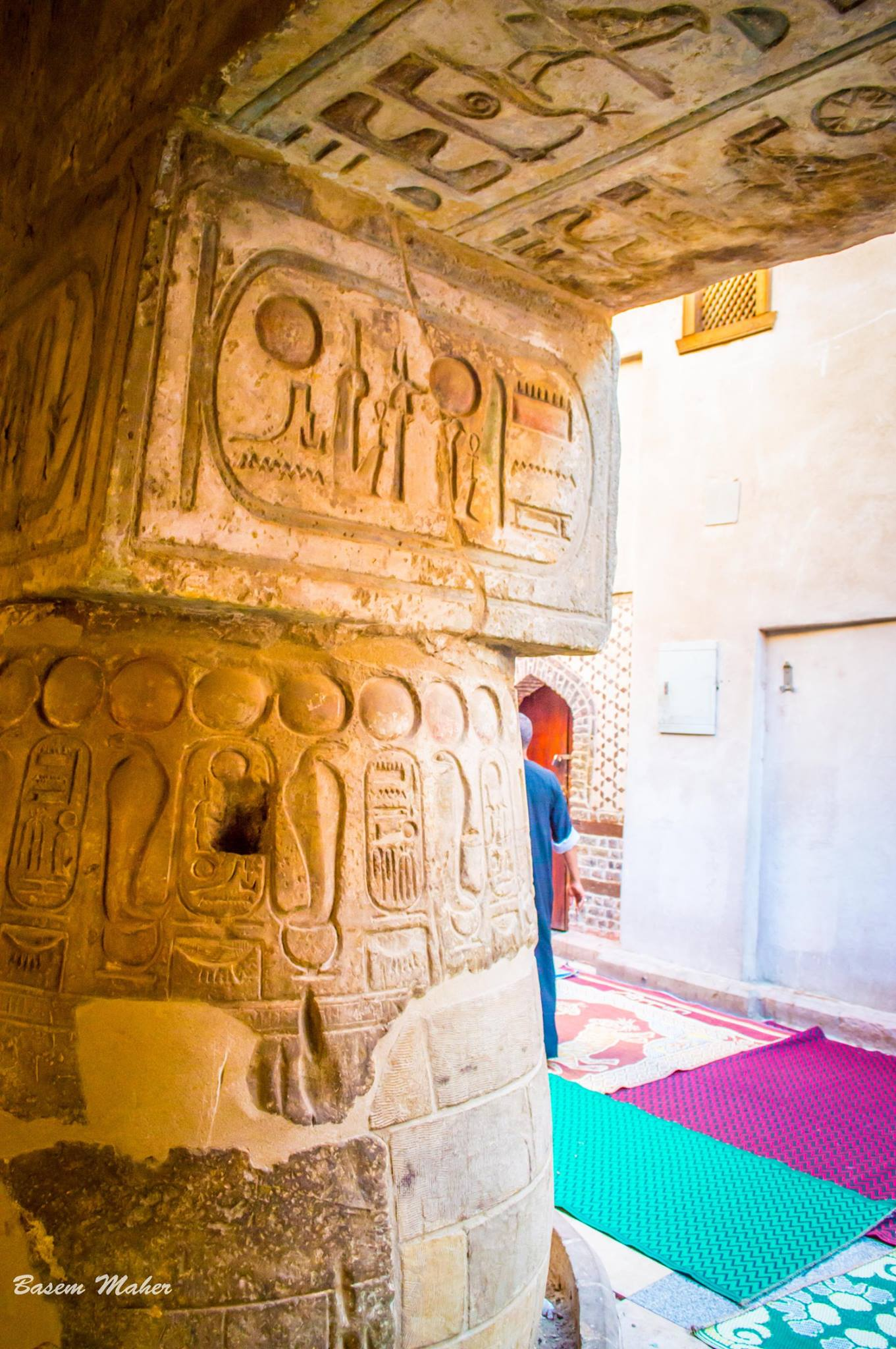

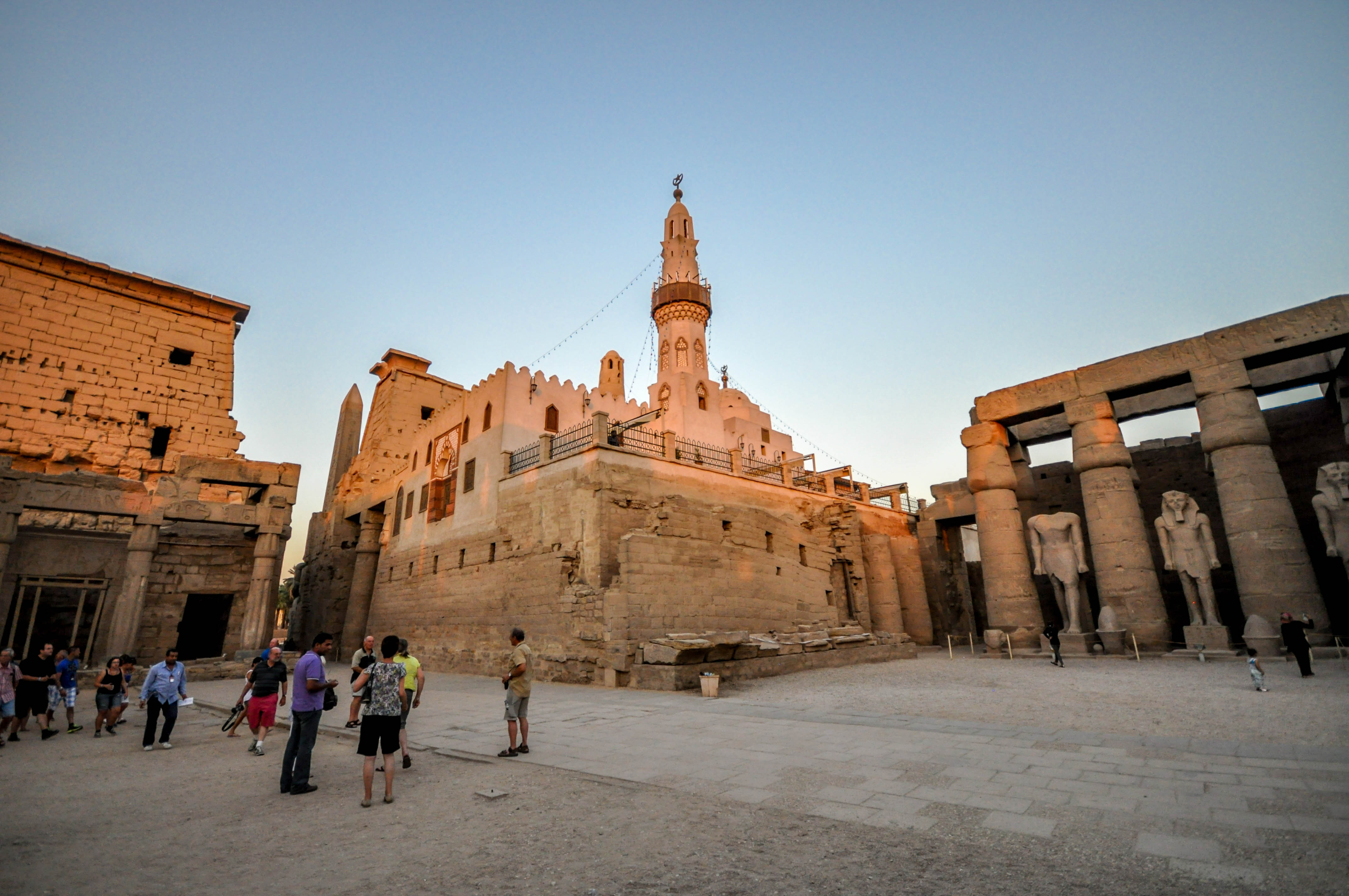

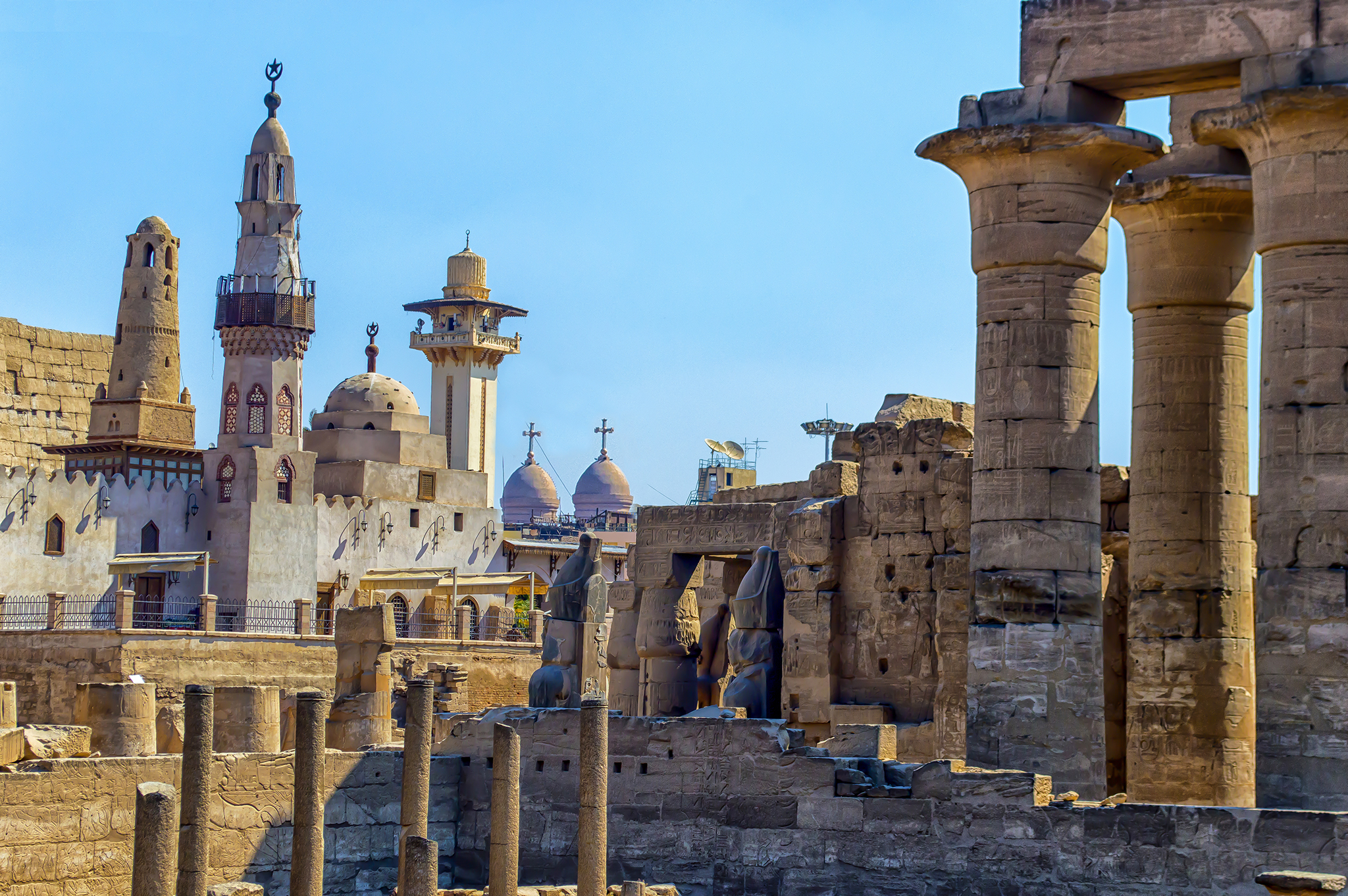

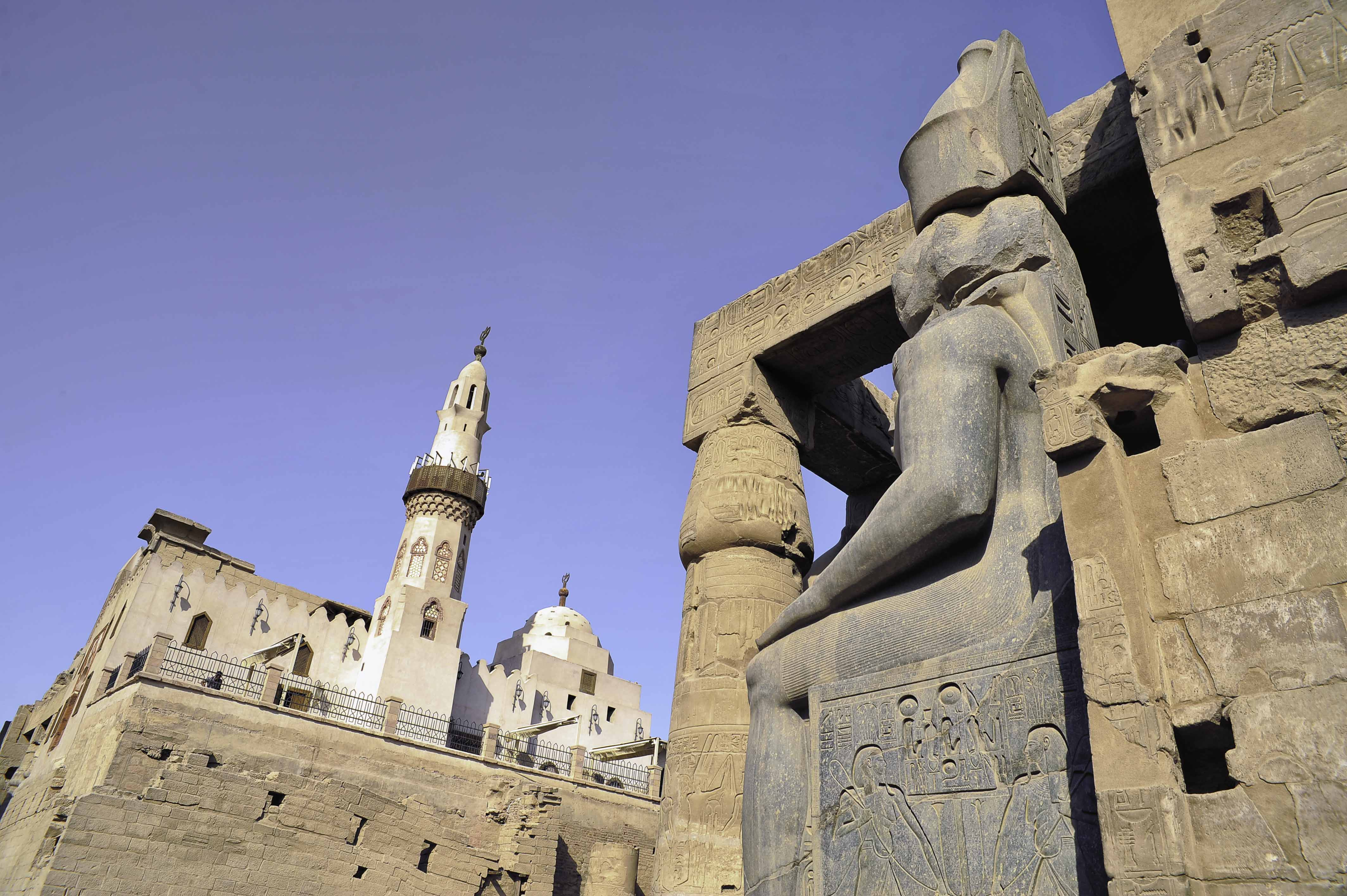

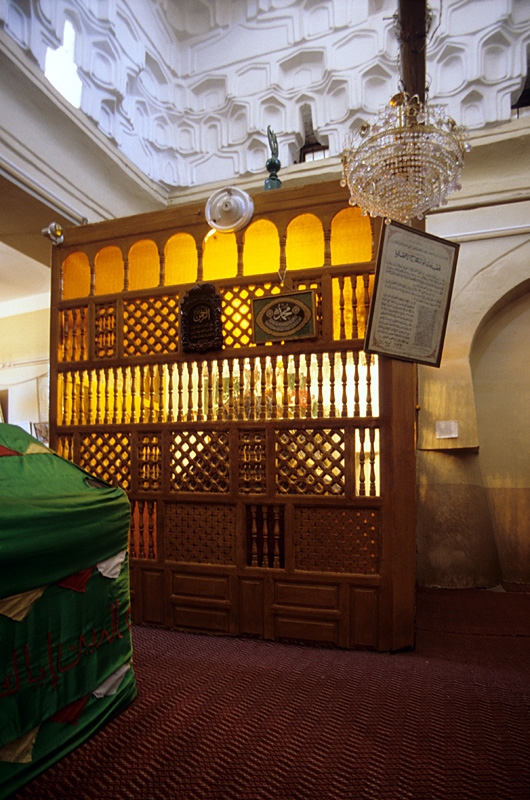

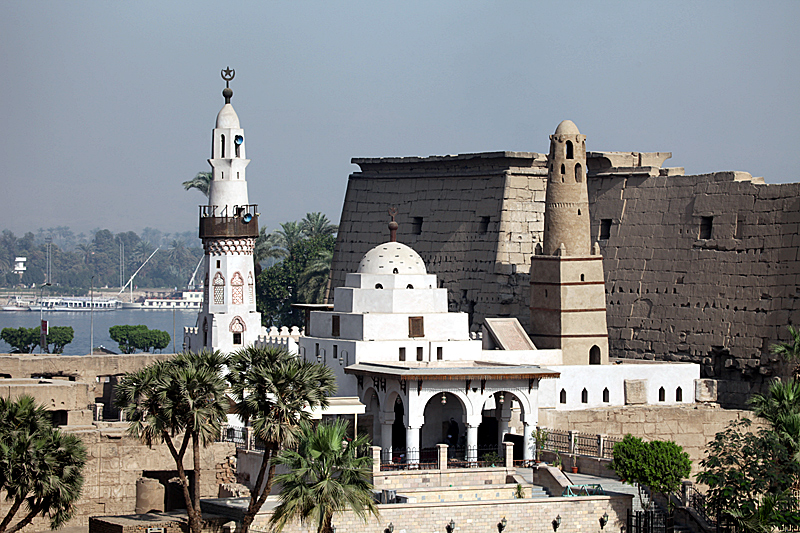

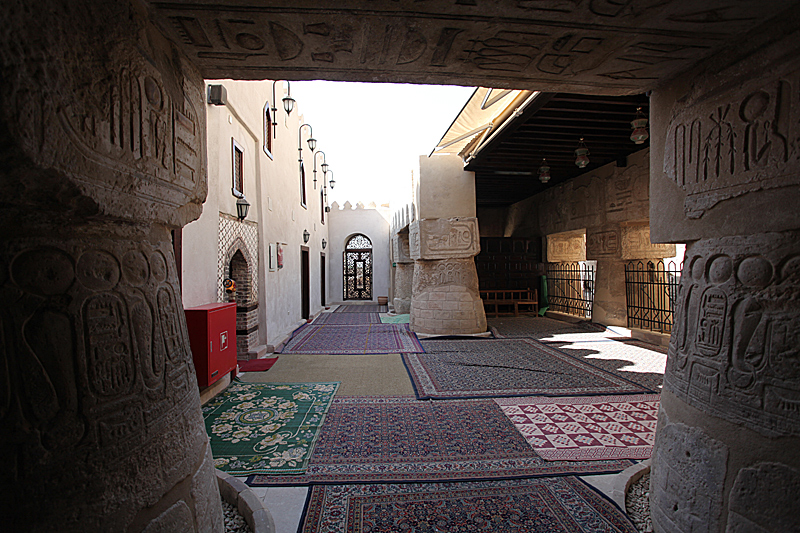

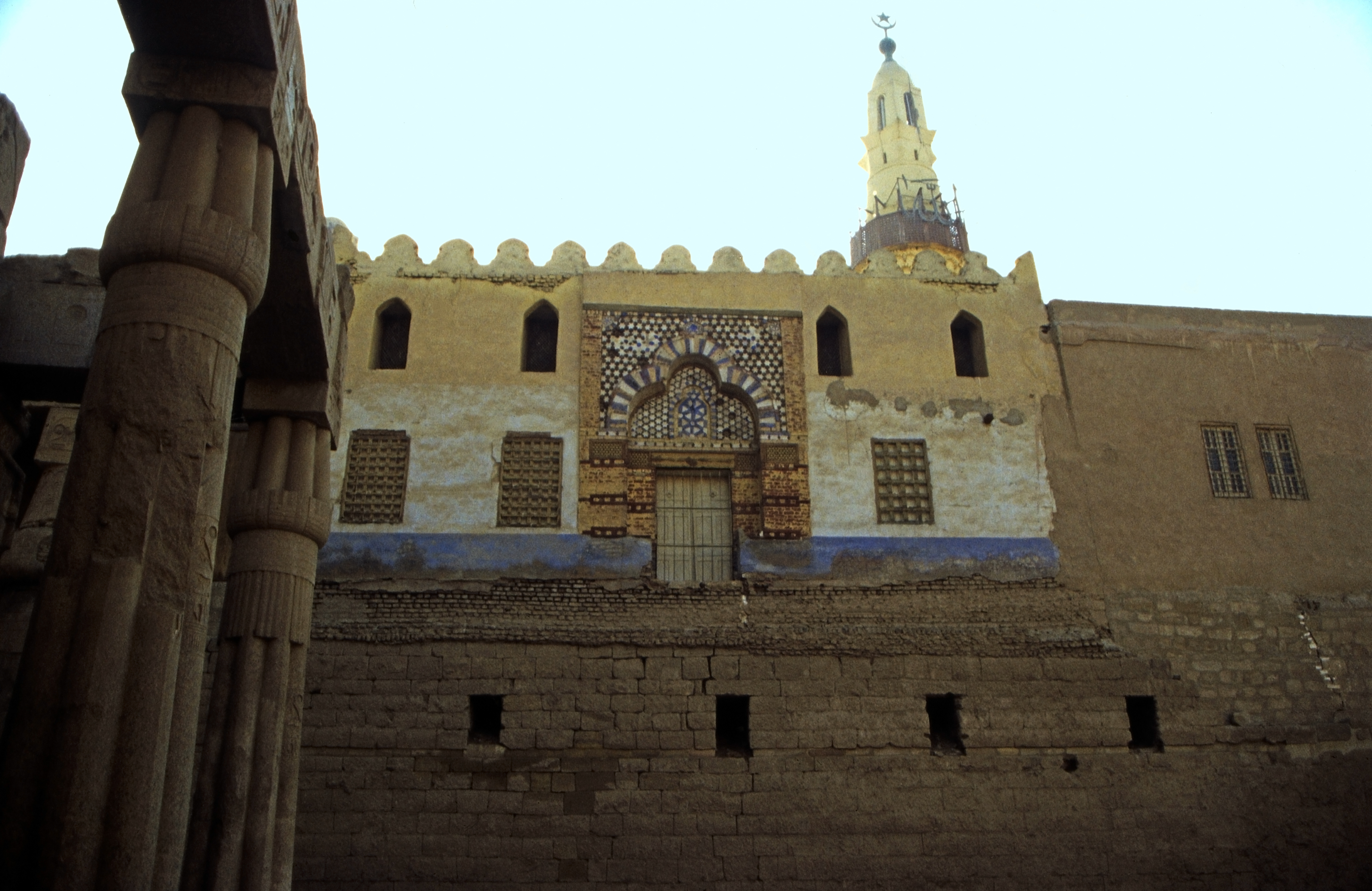

== See also ==
- Islam in Egypt
- List of mosques in Egypt
