= Yusuf Abu al-Haggag =

Egyptian Scholar and Saint of Luxor

Sheikh Yusuf Abu el Haggag
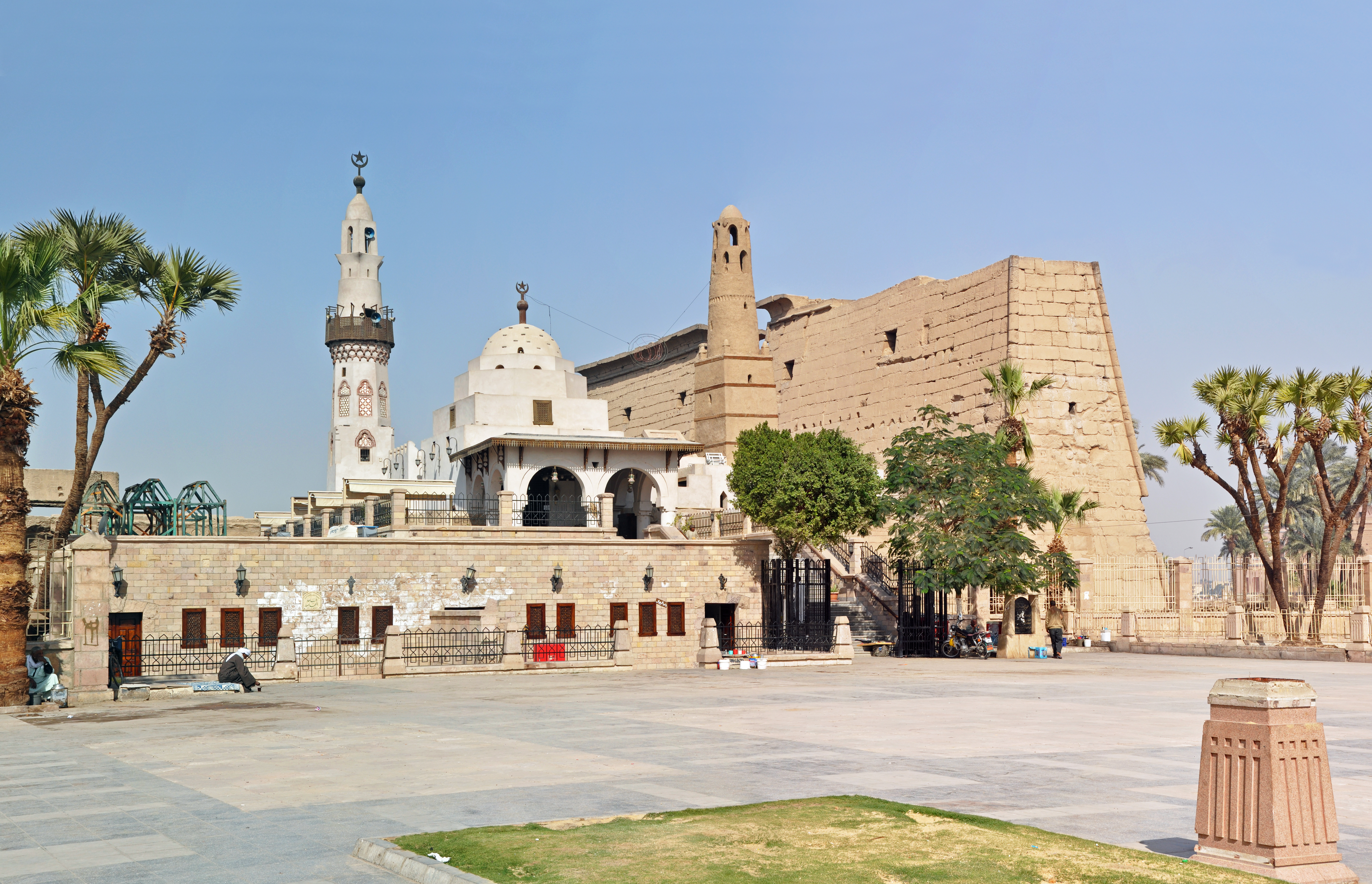
- Abu Haggag Mosque
- Born: c. 1150; Baghdad
- Residence: Luxor
- Died: c. 1245; Luxor
- Patronage: Abu Haggag Mosque
- Tradition or genre: Sufism

Sheikh Yusuf Abu el Haggag (Arabic: الشيخ يوسف أبو الحجاج; c. 1150 – c. 1245), also al Haggag or Al-Hajjaj, (Note: Other forms of the name are also utilised, such as al-Haggag, el-Hajjaj and el-Haggag.) was a mystic Sufi scholar and religious figure whose birthday is celebrated annually in the city of Luxor, Egypt.

== Early life ==
Yusuf Abu el-Haggag was born in Baghdad c. 1150 and is regarded as one of the Sharif, or one of the descendants of Muhammad. His lineage goes back to Husayn ibn Ali.

== Career ==
Abu el-Haggag moved to Mecca, likely between the years 1190 and 1200, and later settled in the upper Egyptian town of Luxor. He established a zawiya in the settlement and devoted himself to knowledge, asceticism and worship. He traveled to Alexandria, where he met prominent Sufis and became a student of Sheikh Abd Al-Razeq. He then returned to Luxor and convened with Sheikh Abdal Rahim Al-Qanai, the owner of the Qena mosque. In his pursuits, he earned the nickname "Father of the Pilgrim". (Note: "حاج" (Hajj) in Arabic means "pilgrim", not to be confused with حج which means "pilgrimage." However, "حجاج" (Hajjaj,) is the word denoting someone who performs the pilgrimage frequently and assiduously. Therefore, the name “Abu el-Haggag” translates to "Father of the Pilgrim".)

Abu el-Haggag is the patron of the Abu Haggag Mosque, where his birthday (Mawlid) (Note: The birthday is known as ‘Mawlid Abu al-Hajjaj al-Uqṣūrī’ in Arabic.) is celebrated annually. Local folklore indicates that he did not build the mosque, but saved it from later attempts by officials to demolish it. (Note: According to local legend, when a local official decided to destroy the mosque, Abu al-Haggag attempted to prevent him from doing so. Nevertheless, the official insisted that the mosque should be demolished. However, just before the mosque was to be torn down, the official woke up one morning to find that he could not move his body. Believing this condition to have been inflicted upon him by Abu al-Haggag, he decided to change his mind and keep the mosque.) el-Haggag likely lived within the site of the temple and conducted his religious teaching there.

== Death and burial ==
Abu el-Haggag died c. 1244 during the reign of Sultan As-Salih Ayyub. By the time of his death, he had amassed a large and devoted following in Luxor. His body was placed in a mausoleum located on the roof of the ancient church, which at this time was buried below ground level. This site is where the early structure of the current mosque was erected a decade later by el-Haggag's son. el-Haggag may have been buried on the site of an already existing mosque.

== Legacy ==
Haggag’s descendants constitute the Haggag family, who organise the celebrations devoted to him. Ahmed Al-Hajj, the head of the Heritage Series at the Egyptian Ministry of Culture, states: “Based on my background and experience working in Luxor, I can say that the annual Sufi Mawlids are unique and highly anticipated rituals for the people of Luxor.”

== See also ==
- Islam in Egypt
