= Ancient Egyptian architecture =

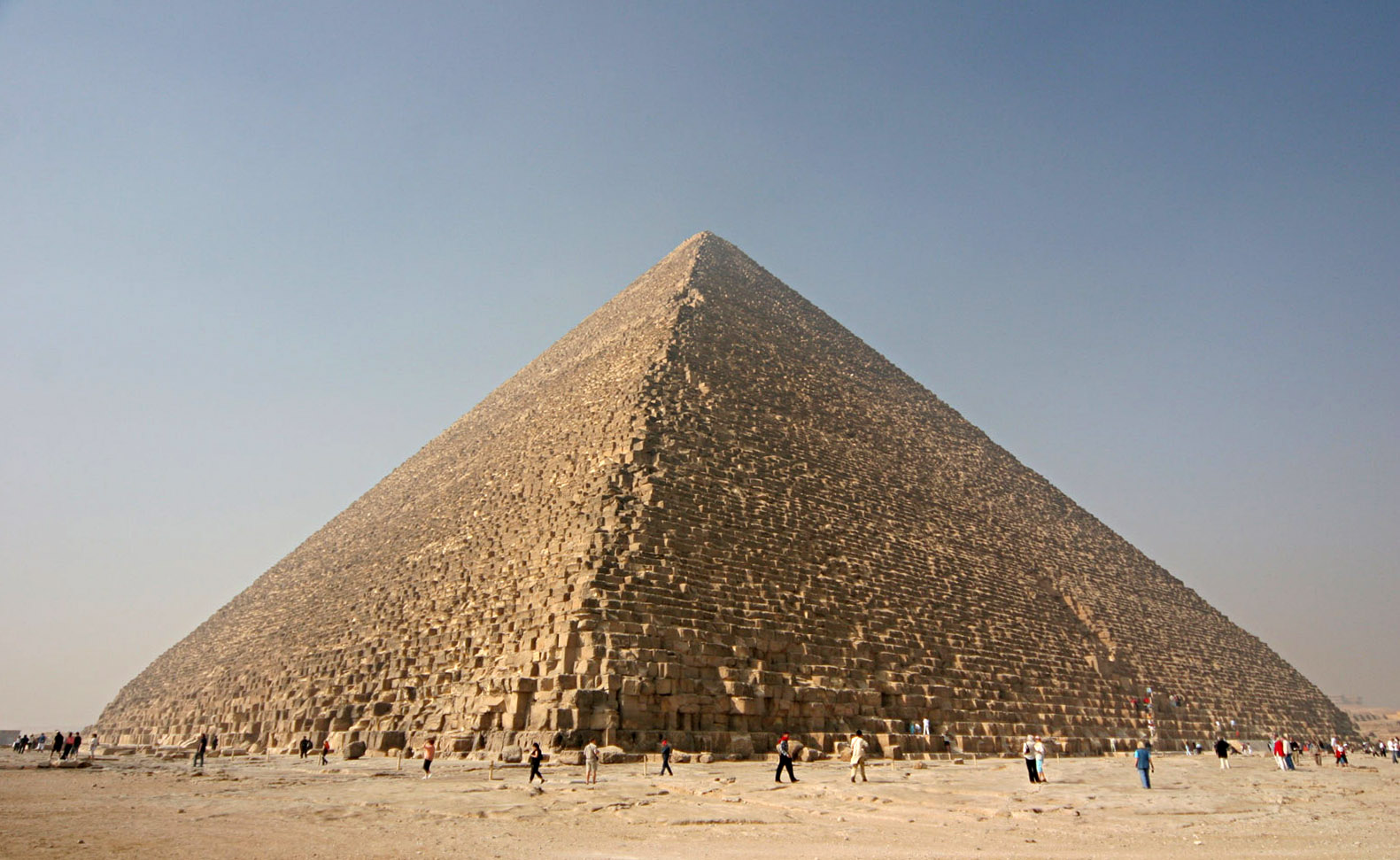
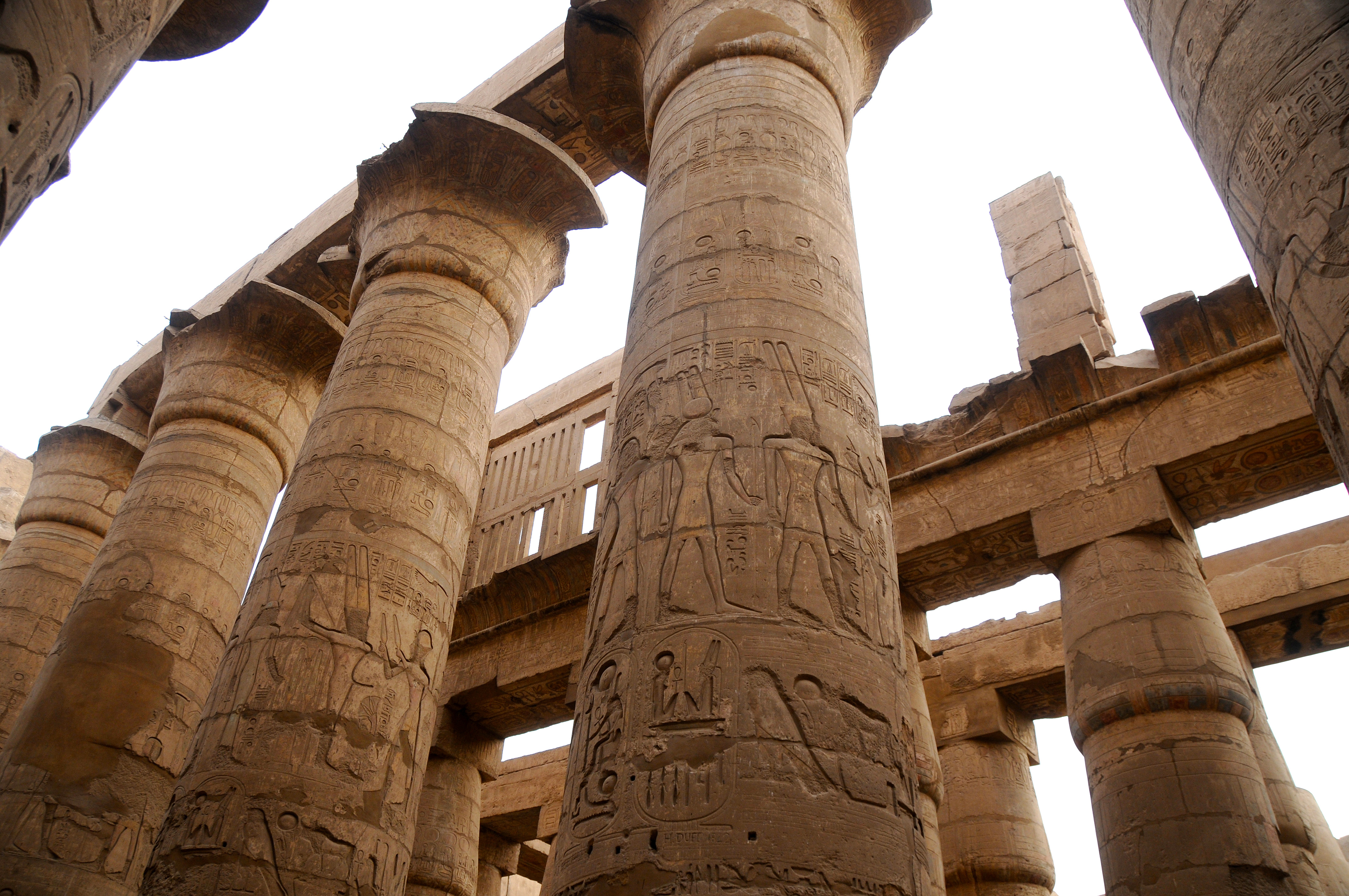
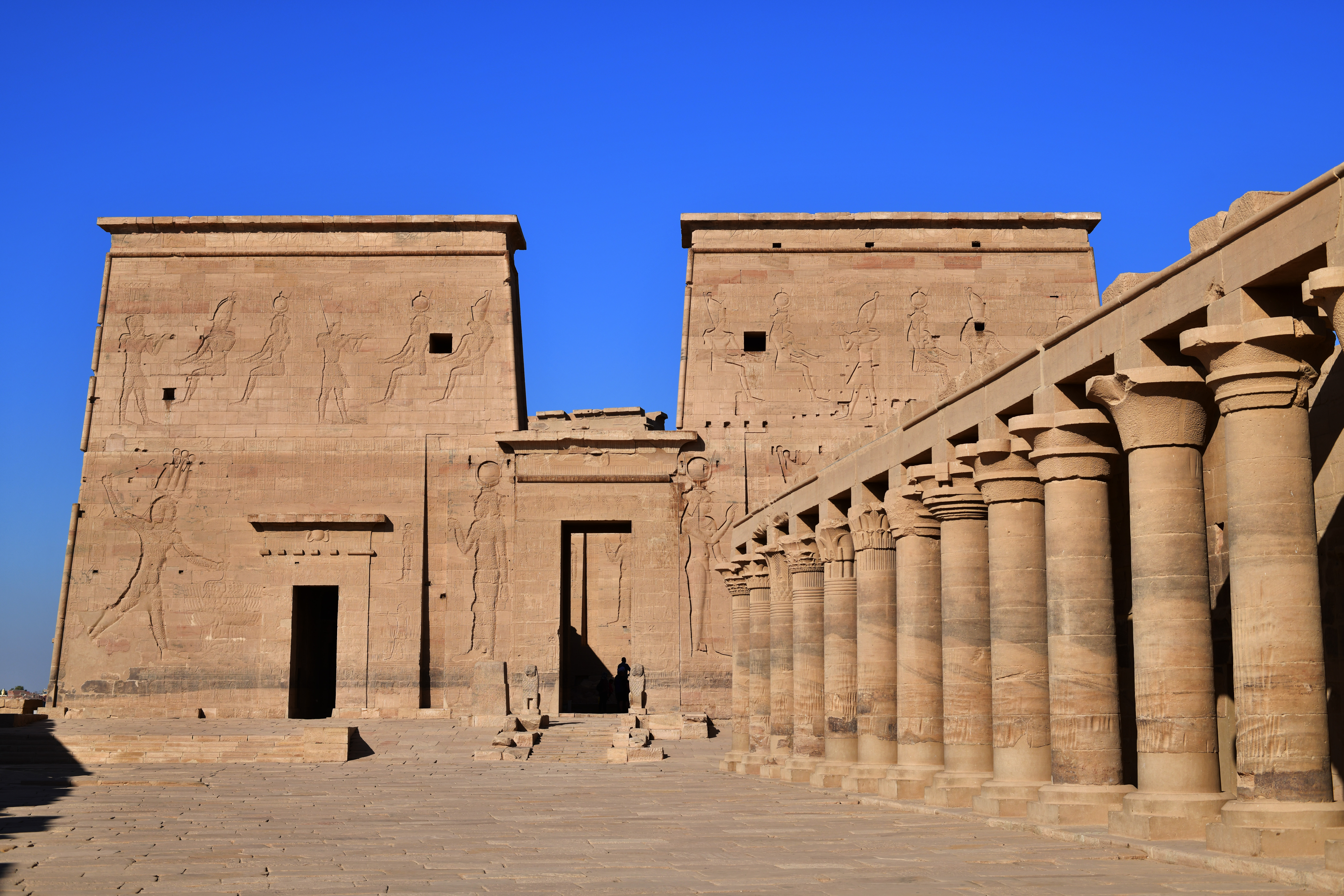
- Top: Great Pyramid of Giza (c. 2589–2566 BC); Centre: Columns of the Great Hypostyle Hall from the Temple of Karnak (c. 1294–1213 BC); Bottom: Temple of Isis from Philae (c. 380 BC – 117 AD)

Additional media
- Years active: c. 3100 BC – 300 AD
- Location: Egypt and Sudan
- Influenced: Achaemenid; Ancient Greek; Nabataean; Ancient Roman

Spanning over three thousand years, ancient Egypt was not one stable civilization but subject to change and periods of great upheaval, commonly split into periods by historians. Likewise, ancient Egyptian architecture is not one style, but a set of styles differing over time but with some commonalities. Nonetheless, religious and funerary architecture, which is the great majority of what survives, was generally conservative in taste.

The best known example of ancient Egyptian architecture are the Egyptian pyramids and the Sphinx, while excavated temples, palaces, tombs, and fortresses have also been studied. Most buildings were built of locally available mud brick and limestone by paid laborers and craftsmen. Monumental buildings were built using the post and lintel method of construction. Many buildings were aligned astronomically. Columns were typically adorned with capitals decorated to resemble plants important to Egyptian civilization, such as the papyrus plant.

Ancient Egyptian architectural motifs have influenced architecture elsewhere, reaching the wider world first during the Greek Orientalizing period and again during the nineteenth-century Egyptomania.

== Characteristics ==
=== Materials and construction methods ===
Due to the scarcity of wood, the two predominant building materials used in ancient Egypt were sun-baked mud brick and stone, mainly limestone, but also sandstone and granite in considerable quantities. From the Old Kingdom onward, stone was generally reserved for tombs and temples, while bricks were used even for royal palaces, fortresses, the walls of temple precincts and towns, and for subsidiary buildings in temple complexes. The core of the pyramids consisted of locally quarried stone, mud bricks, sand or gravel. For the casing, stones were used that had to be transported from farther away, predominantly white limestone from Tura and red granite from upper Egypt.

Ancient Egyptian houses were made out of mud collected from the damp banks of the Nile river. It was placed in moulds and left to dry in the hot sun to harden for use in construction. If the bricks were intended to be used in a royal tomb like a pyramid, the exterior bricks would also be finely chiselled and polished.

Many Egyptian towns have disappeared because they were situated near the cultivated area of the Nile Valley and were flooded as the river bed slowly rose during the millennia, or the mud bricks and sun-dried brick of which they were built were used by peasants as fertilizer. Others are inaccessible, new buildings having been erected on ancient ones. However, the dry, hot climate of Egypt preserved some mud brick structures. Examples include the village Deir el-Medina, the Middle Kingdom town at Kahun, and the fortresses at Buhen and Mirgissa. Also, many temples and tombs have survived because they were built on high ground unaffected by the Nile flood and were constructed of stone.

Thus, our understanding of ancient Egyptian architecture is based mainly on religious monuments, massive structures characterized by thick, sloping walls with few openings, possibly echoing a method of construction used to obtain stability in mud walls. In a similar manner, the incised and flatly modeled surface adornment of the stone buildings may have derived from mud wall ornamentation. Although the use of the arch was developed during the fourth dynasty, all monumental buildings are post and lintel constructions, with flat roofs constructed of huge stone blocks supported by the external walls and the closely spaced columns.

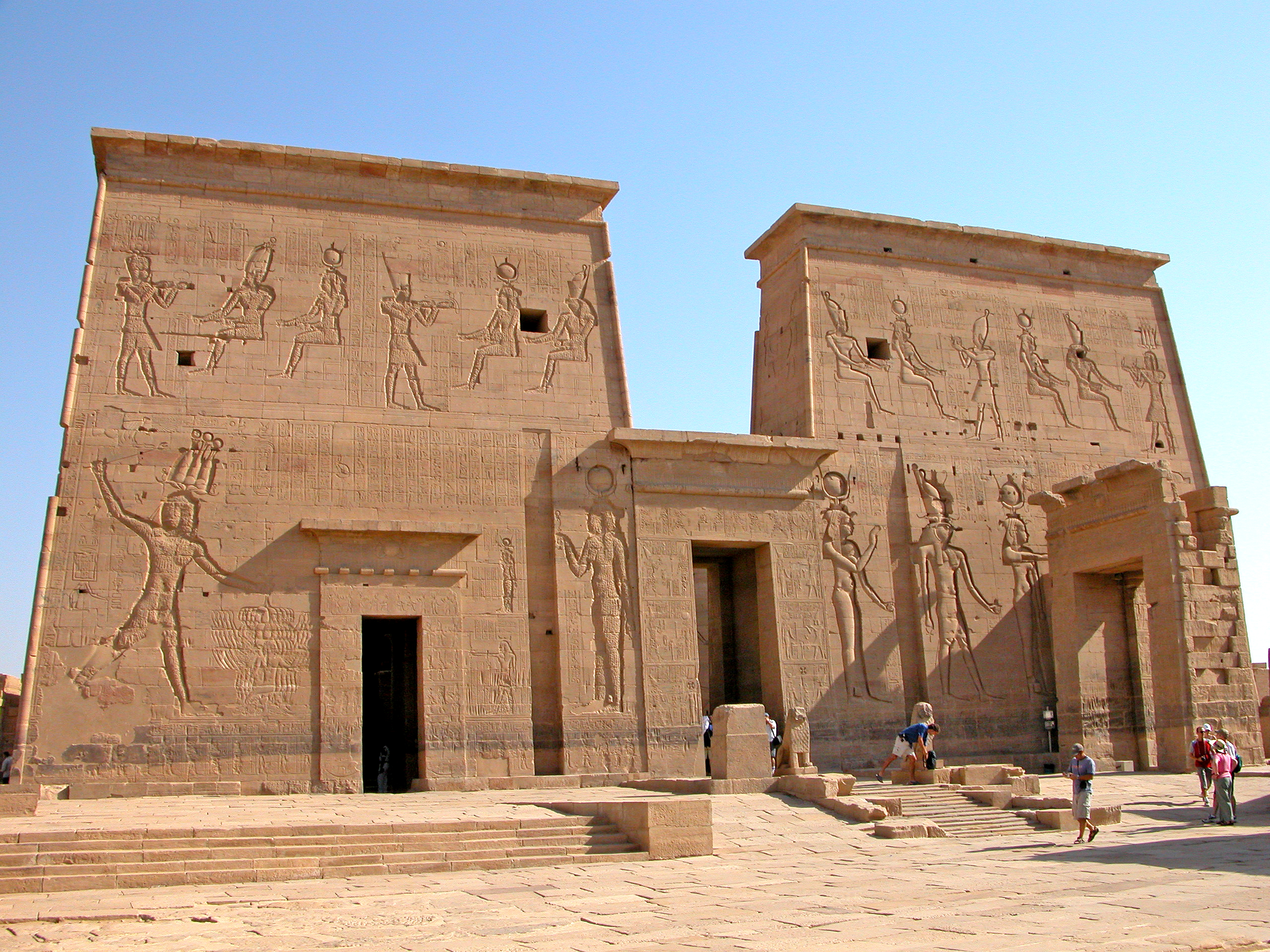
The well preserved first pylon at the Temple of Isis in Philae, serving as a monumental gateway to the temple complex

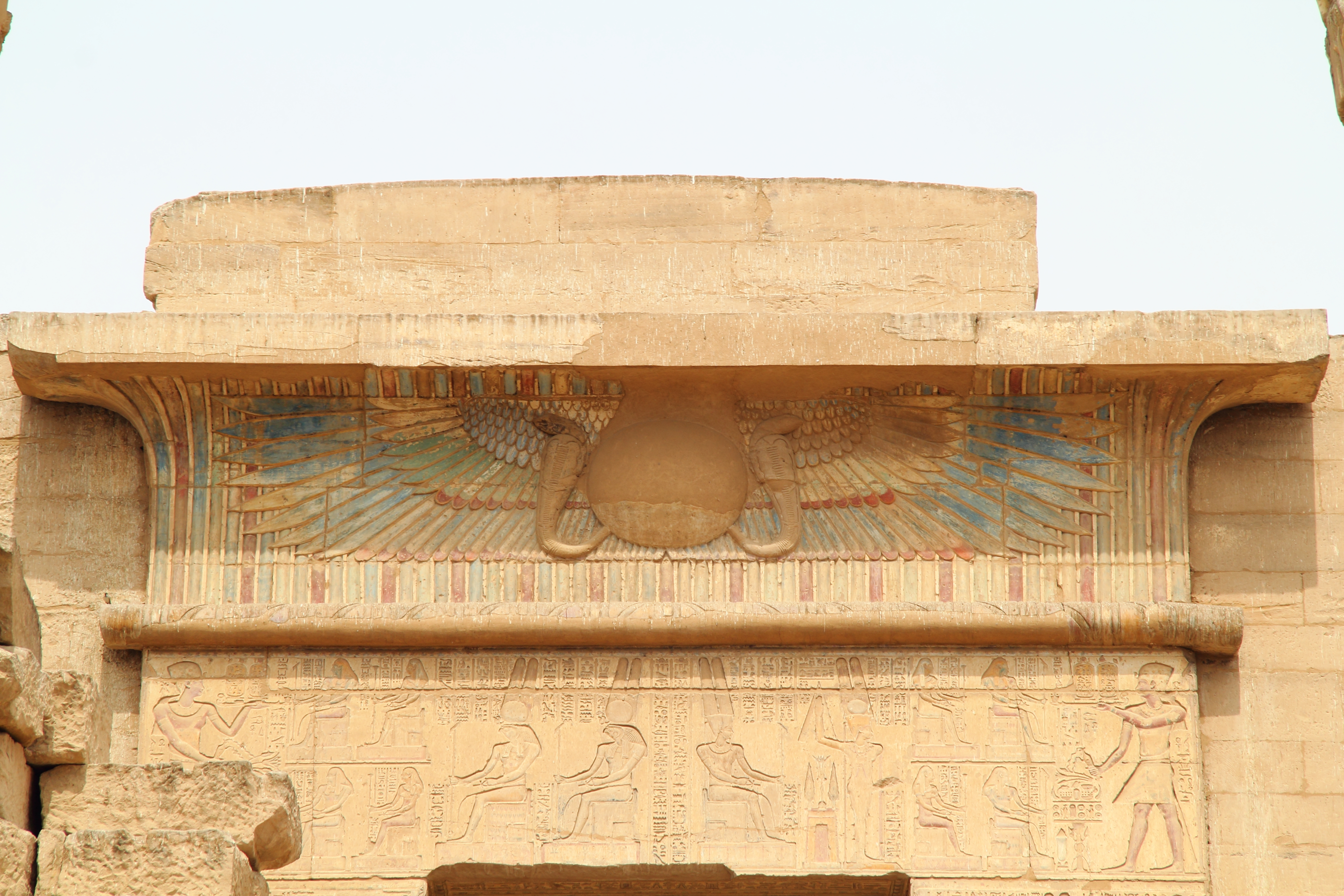
Winged sun on a cavetto from the Medinet Habu temple complex. The winged sun represents a form of the falcon god Horus, son of Isis, triumphant over his enemies. The image was also a common protective device over temple entrances.

=== Decoration and motifs ===
Exterior and interior walls, as well as the columns and piers, were covered with hieroglyphic and pictorial frescoes and carvings painted in brilliant colors. Many motifs of Egyptian ornamentation are symbolic, such as the scarab, or sacred beetle, the solar disk, and the vulture. Other common motifs include palm leaves, the papyrus plant, and the buds and flowers of the lotus. Hieroglyphs were inscribed for decorative purposes as well as to record historic events or spells. In addition, these pictorial frescoes and carvings allow us to understand how the Ancient Egyptians lived, statuses, wars that were fought, and their beliefs. This was especially true in recent years when exploring the tombs of Ancient Egyptian officials.

Ancient Egyptian temples were aligned with astronomically significant events, such as solstices and equinoxes, requiring precise measurements at the moment of the particular event. Measurements at the most significant temples may have been ceremonially undertaken by the Pharaoh himself.

=== Columns ===
As early as 2600 BC the architect Imhotep made use of stone columns whose surface was carved to reflect the organic form of bundled reeds, like papyrus, lotus and palm; in later Egyptian architecture faceted cylinders were also common. Their form is thought to derive from archaic reed-built shrines. Carved from stone, the columns were highly decorated with carved and painted hieroglyphs, texts, ritual imagery and natural motifs. Egyptian columns are famously present in the Great Hypostyle Hall of Karnak (c. 1224 BC), where 134 columns are lined up in 16 rows, with some columns reaching heights of 24 metres.

One of the most important type are the papyriform columns. The origin of these columns goes back to the 5th Dynasty. They are composed of lotus (papyrus) stems which are drawn together into a bundle decorated with bands: the capital, instead of opening out into the shape of a bellflower, swells out and then narrows again like a flower in bud. The base, which tapers to take the shape of a half-sphere like the stem of the lotus, has a continuously recurring decoration of stipules. At the Luxor Temple, the columns are reminiscent of papyrus bundles, perhaps symbolic of the marsh from which the ancient Egyptians believed the creation of the world to have unfolded.

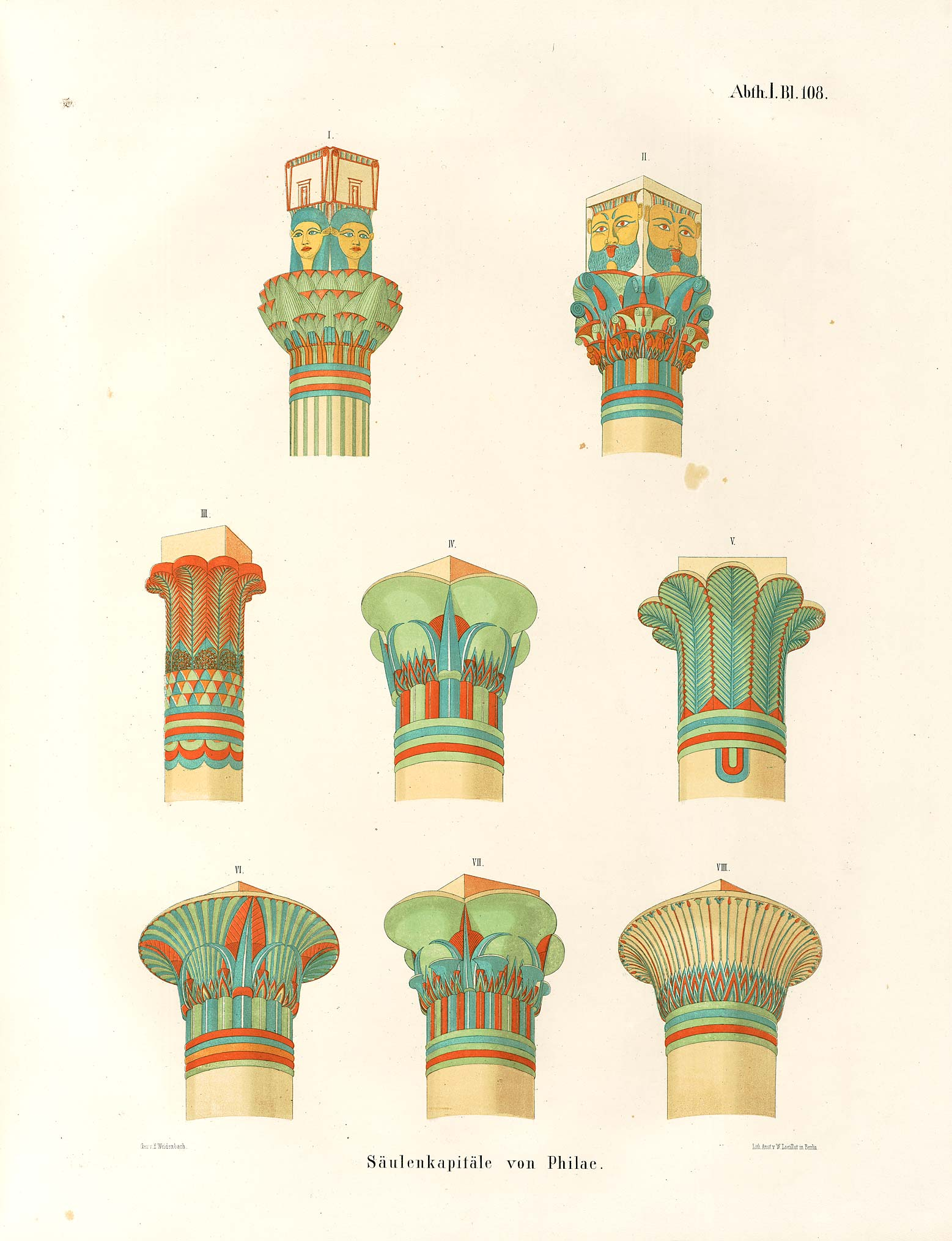
Illustrations of various types of capitals, c. 1849–1859, drawn by the egyptologist Karl Richard Lepsius

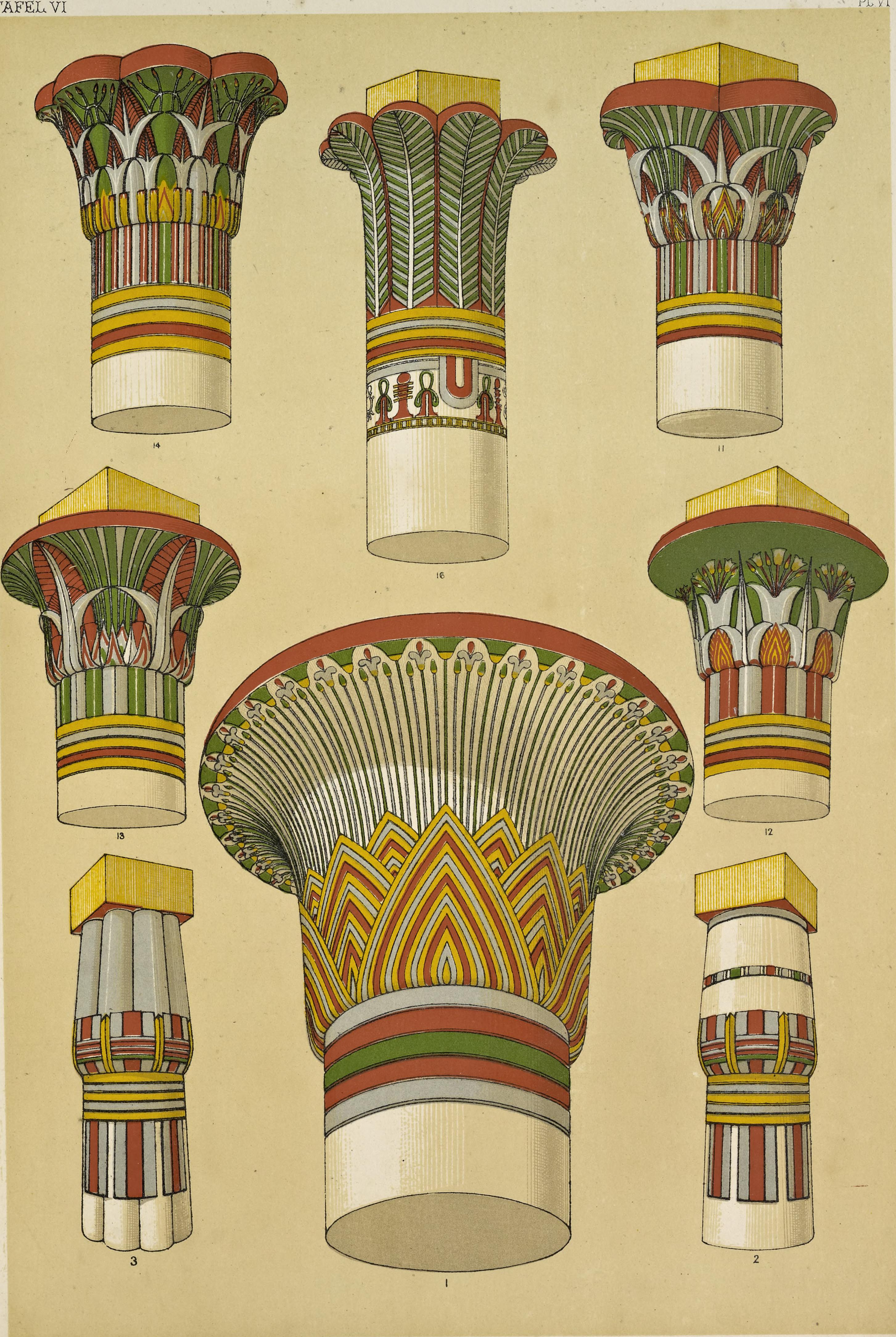
Illustrations of papyriform capitals, in The Grammar of Ornament

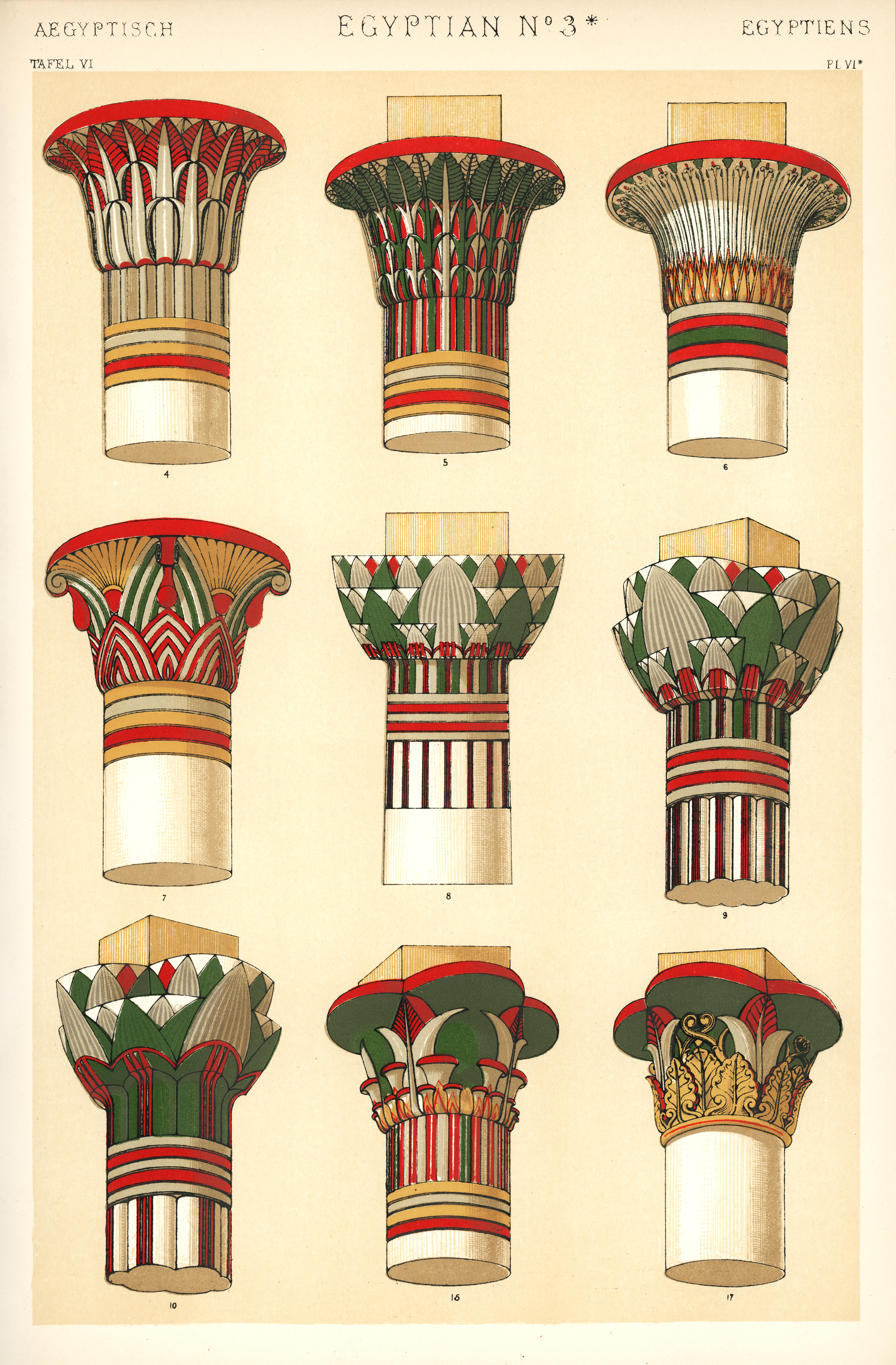
Illustration of other nine types of capitals, from The Grammar of Ornament

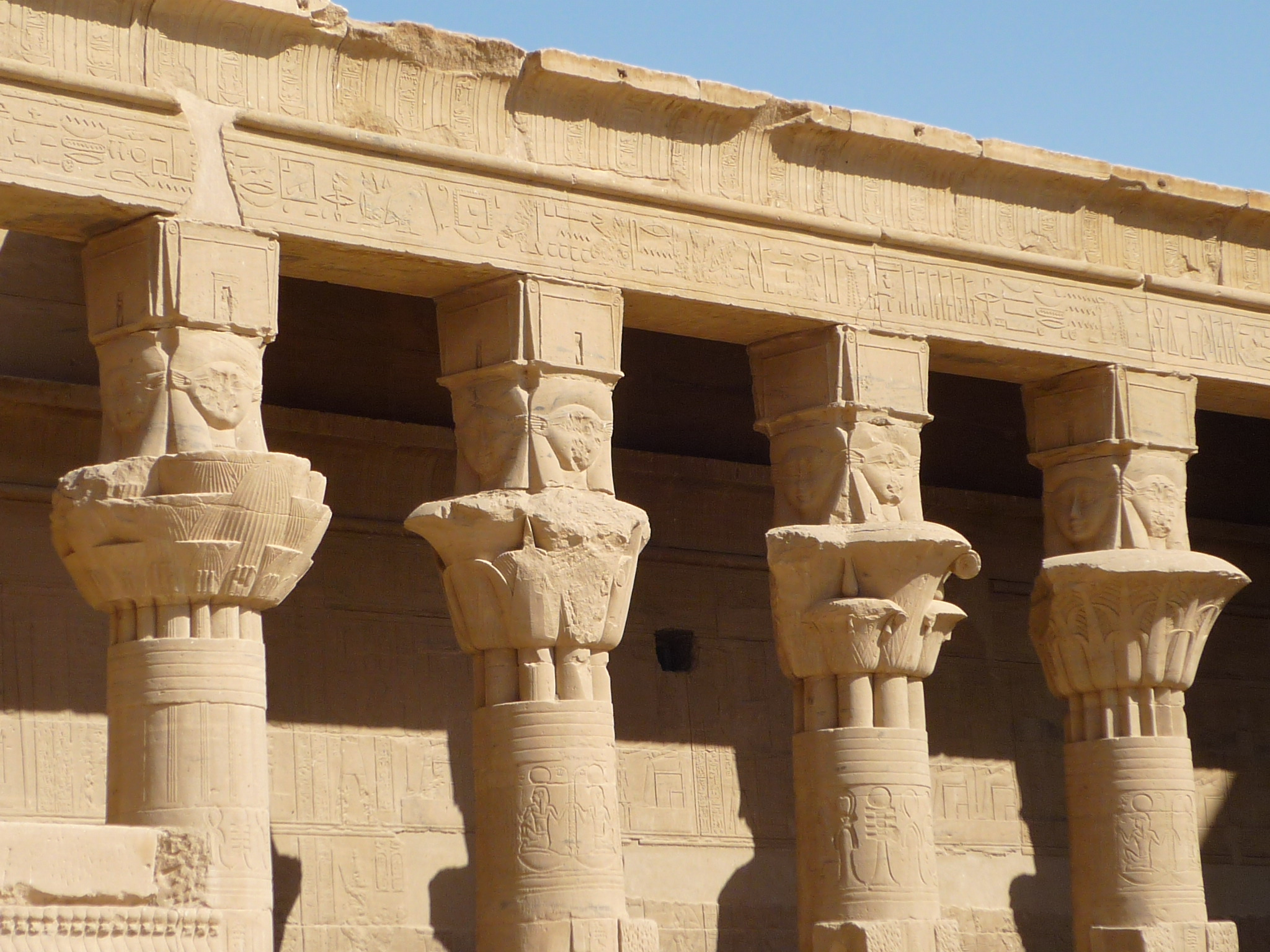
Columns with Hathoric capitals, at the Temple of Isis from island Philae

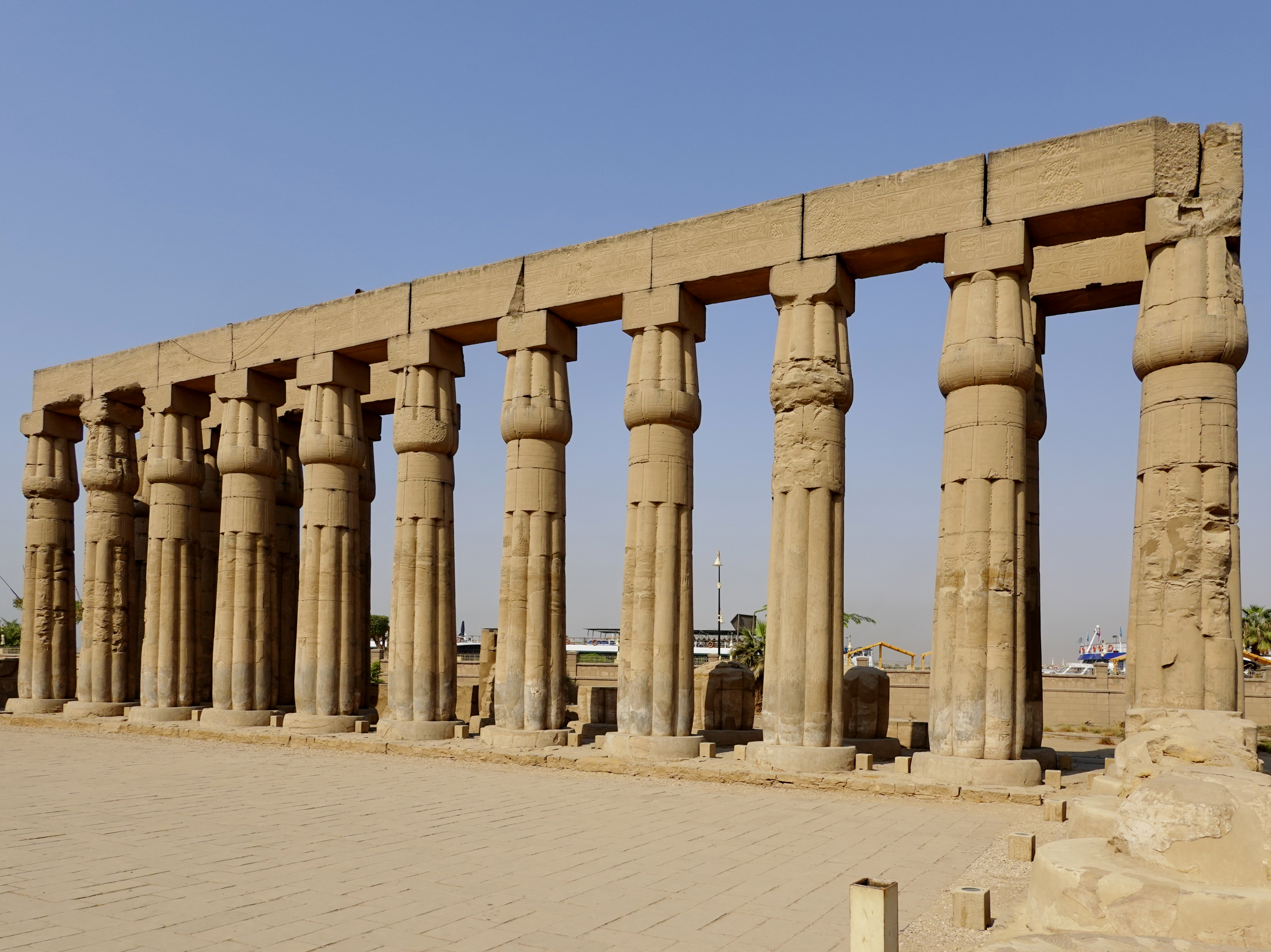
Papyriform columns in the Luxor Temple

=== Gardens ===
Three types of gardens are attested from ancient Egypt: temple gardens, private gardens, and vegetable gardens. Some temples, such as those at Deir el-Bahri, were provided with groves and trees, especially the sacred Ished Tree (Persea). Private pleasure gardens are known from an 11th Dynasty tomb model of Meketra, and from tomb decoration of the New Kingdom. They were typically surrounded by a high wall, planted with trees and flowers, and provided with shady areas. Plants were cultivated for fruits and fragrance. Flowers included cornflowers, poppies and daisies, while the pomegranate, introduced in the New Kingdom, became a popular shrub. The gardens of wealthier individuals were arranged around an ornamental pool for fish, waterfowl and water-lilies. Vegetable plots, whether privately owned or belonging to temples, were laid out in squares divided by water channels, and located close to the Nile. They were irrigated by hand, or (from the late 18th Dynasty) by means of the shaduf.

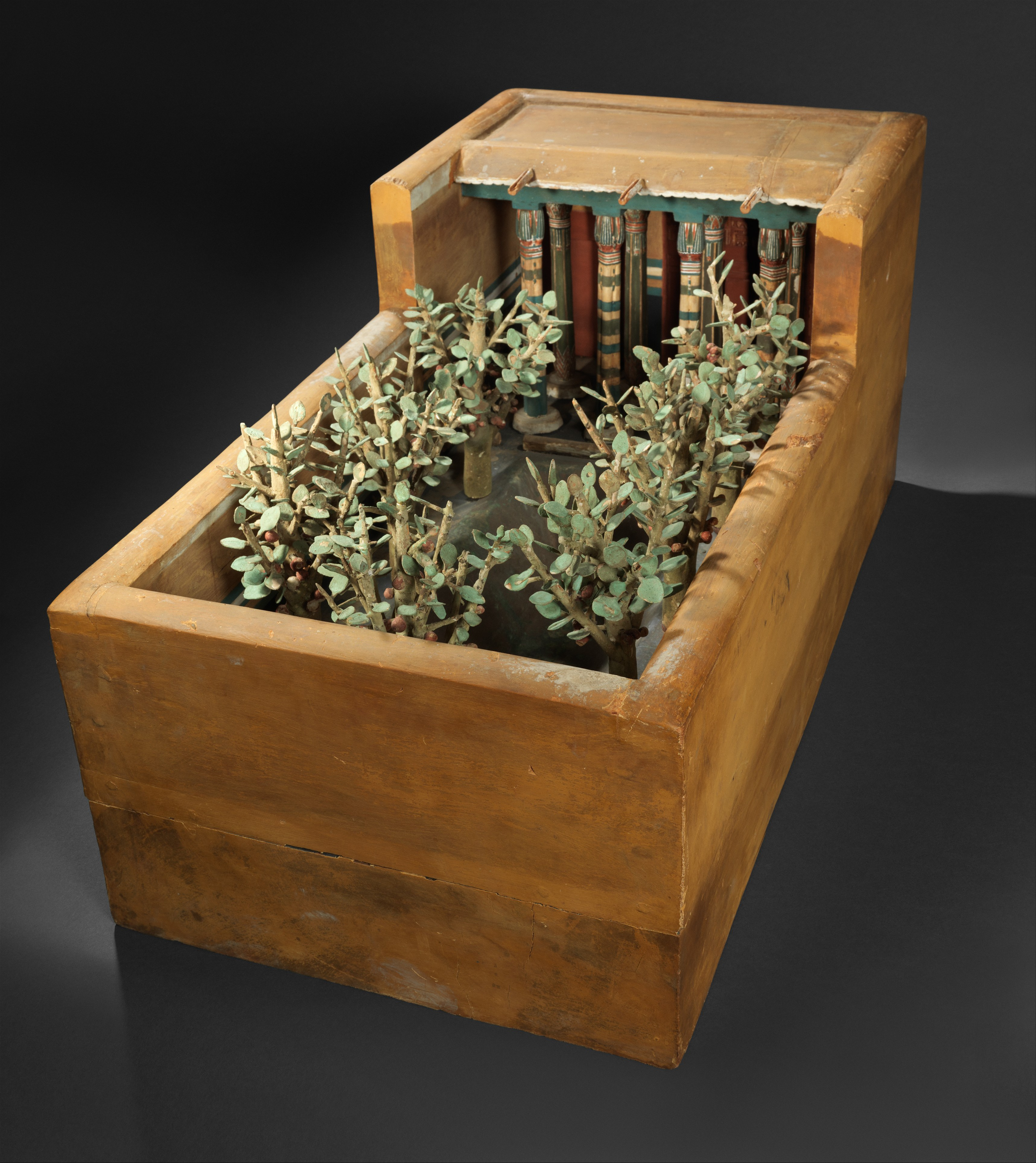
Model of Meketra's house and garden from his tomb at Thebes, which consists of a shady grove of trees surrounding a central garden; c. 1981–1975 BC; painted wood and copper; height: 39.5 cm (15 9/16 in.); Metropolitan Museum of Art (New York City)

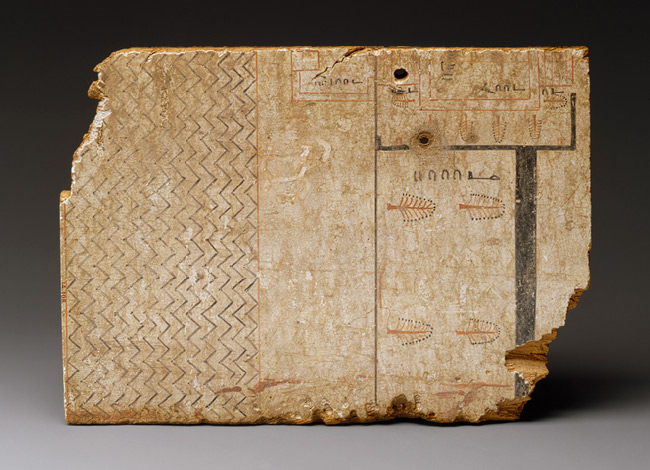
Architectural drawing of a garden, on a writing board; c. 1550–1295 BC; plastered and painted wood; height: 23.5 cm (9 1/4 in.); Metropolitan Museum of Art

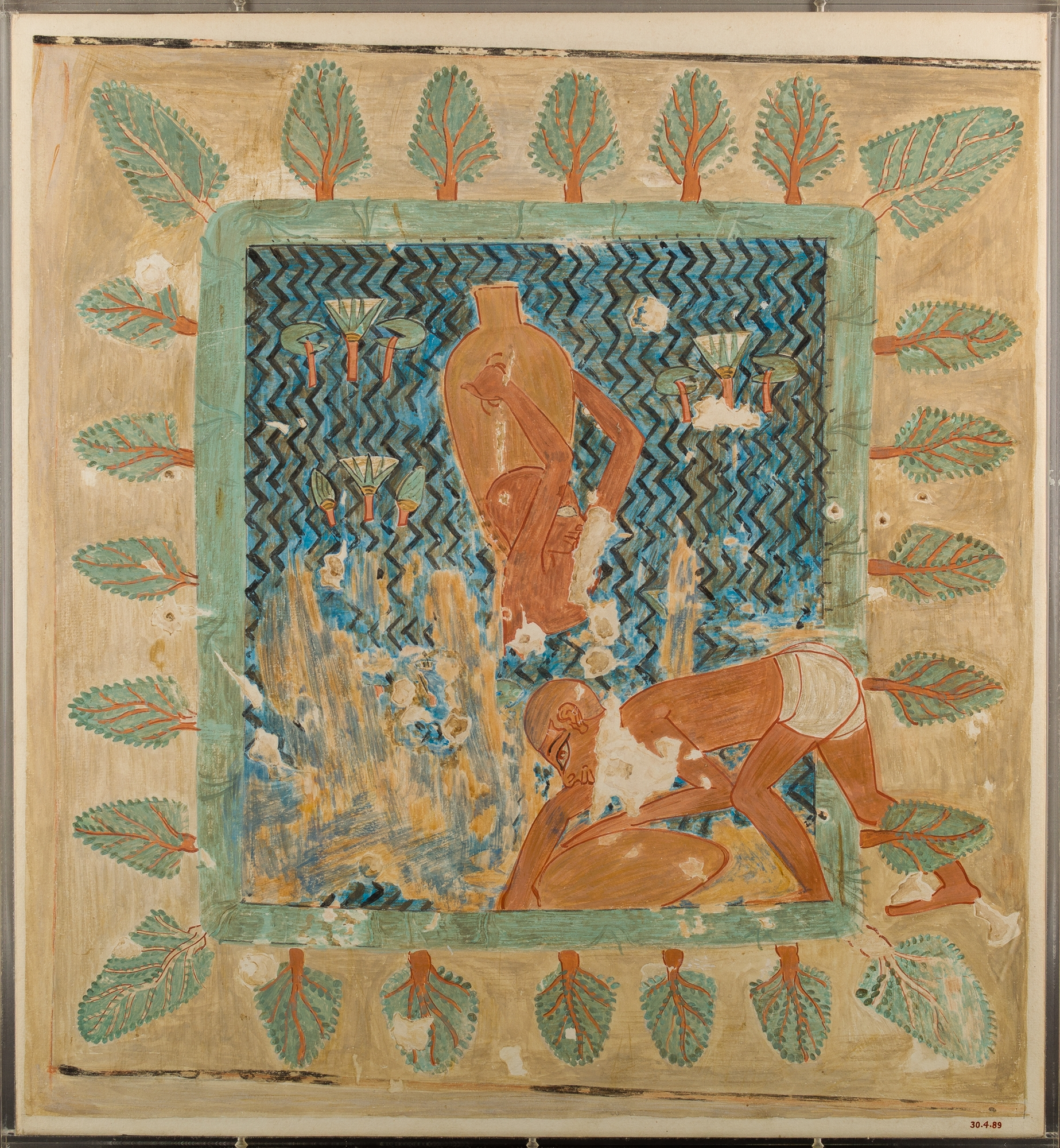
Brickmakers getting water from a pool; c. 1479–1425 BC; tempera on paper; from the tomb of Rekhmire; Metropolitan Museum of Art

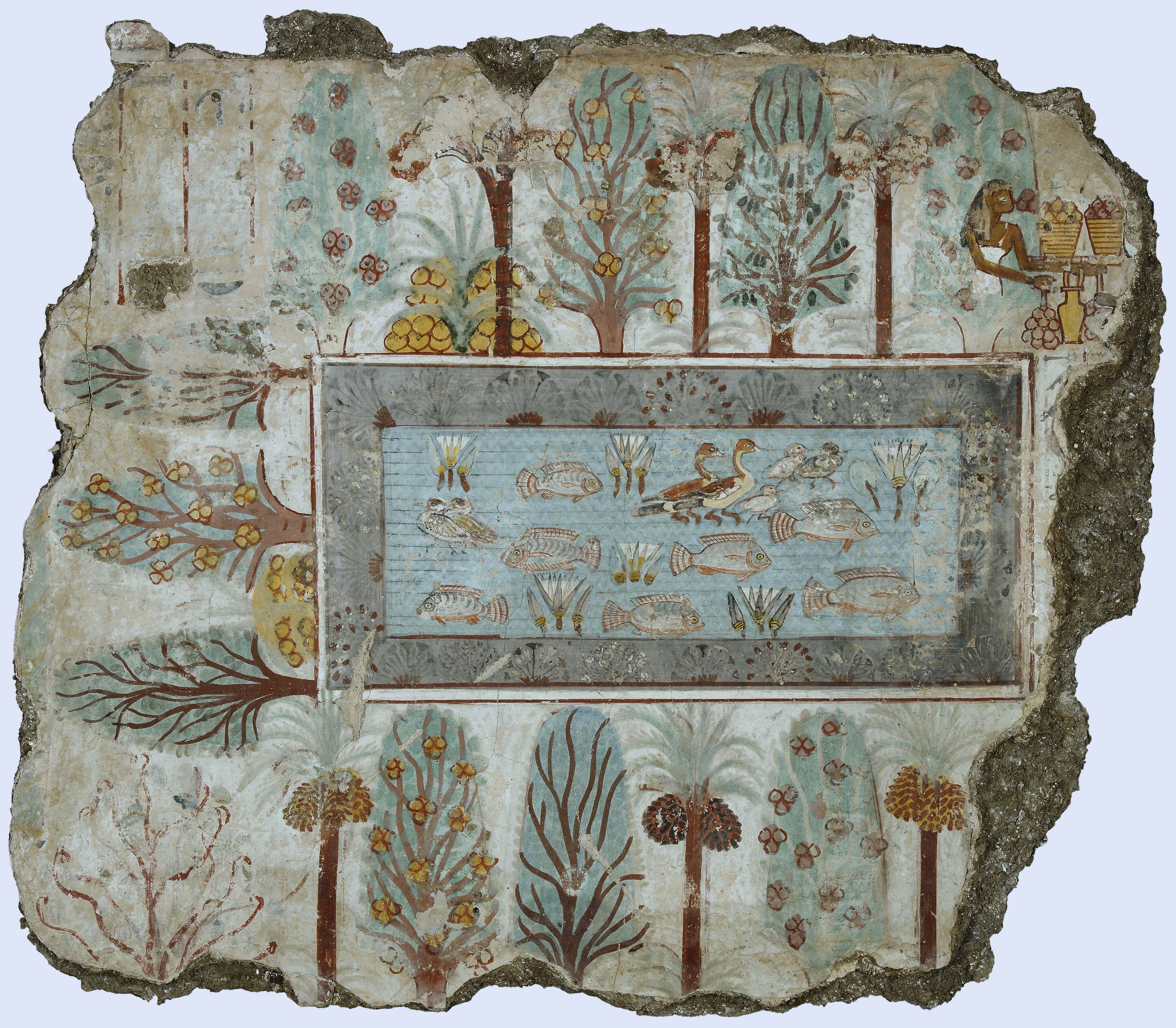
Fresco which depicts the pool in Nebamun's estate garden; c. 1350 BC; painted plaster; height: 64 cm (maxim); British Museum (London)

== Old Kingdom ==
=== Mastabas ===
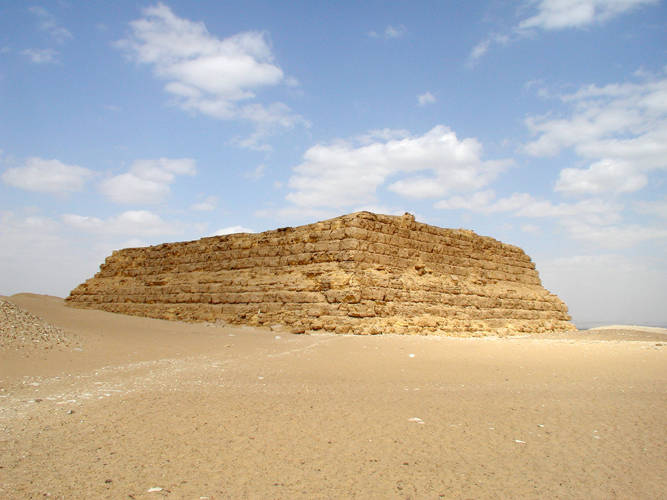
Mastabat al-Fir’aun, where king Shepseskaf was buried, made of red sandstone, pink granite and Tura limestone

Archaeological data has indicated that the megalithic monuments in the Saharan region of Niger and the Eastern Sahara which developed, as early as 4700 BCE, may have served as antecedents for the mastabas and pyramids of ancient Egypt.

Mastabas are burial tombs that hold royal significance. As chosen by Egyptian rulers, many of the tombs found throughout time were located along the Nile river. The structural exterior regarding Mastabas varies throughout history but there is a noticeable evolution in successive Egyptian dynasties. The mastabas of the First Egyptian Dynasty would be created through the use of stepped bricks. The design evolved so that by the time of the Fourth Dynasty the structural exterior had been changed from brick to stone. The reasoning behind the stepped designs of mastabas is connected to the idea of "accession". Lateral penetration was a concern in when constructing tombs. In order to prevent damage to the structure, brickwork layers were placed around the base of structure. Mastabas from the old empire took on a pyramidal design structure. This design was largely reserved for rulers, such as the king and his family as a means for burial. Other design characteristics regarding mastabas from the Old Kingdom include having rectangular outlines, walls that were slanted, the use of stone and brick materials, and having the axis of the structure run North-South. Multiple elements make up the interior of a mastaba such as an offering chamber, statues for the dead, and a vault beneath which held the sarcophagus. By the end of the Old Kingdom, the use of these tombs had been abandoned.

=== Saqqara ===
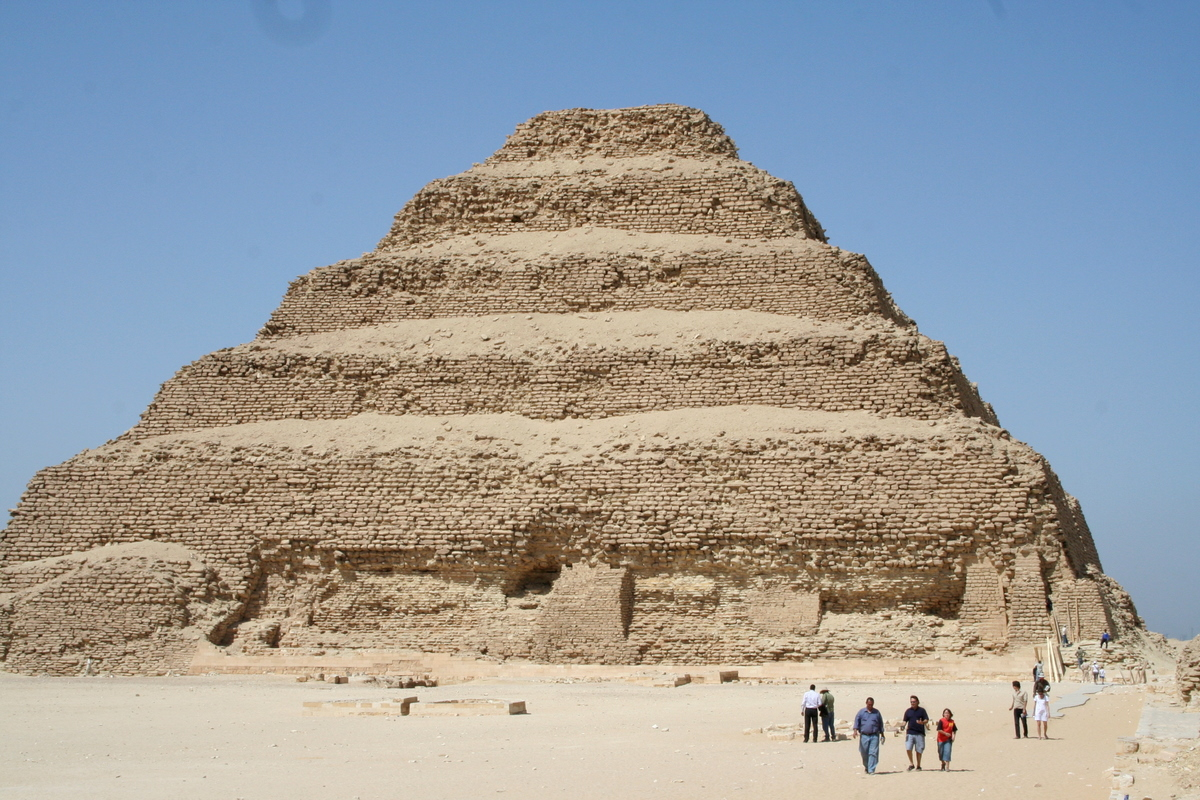
Pyramid of Djoser at Saqqara (c. 2650 BC)

The oldest monumental stone structure of Egypt is the Stepped Pyramid of Djoser at Saqqara (c. 2650 BC). Attributed to the architect Imhotep, this funerary monument marks the origin of pyramid tombs and is the earliest form of monumental architecture in history. Its design transformed the simple flat mastaba tomb into an elevated structure by replicating it in additional levels stacked one on top of the other, each smaller than the one below, resulting in a stepped profile. This achievement also marked the new importance of worked stone as a building material.

=== Early pyramid development ===
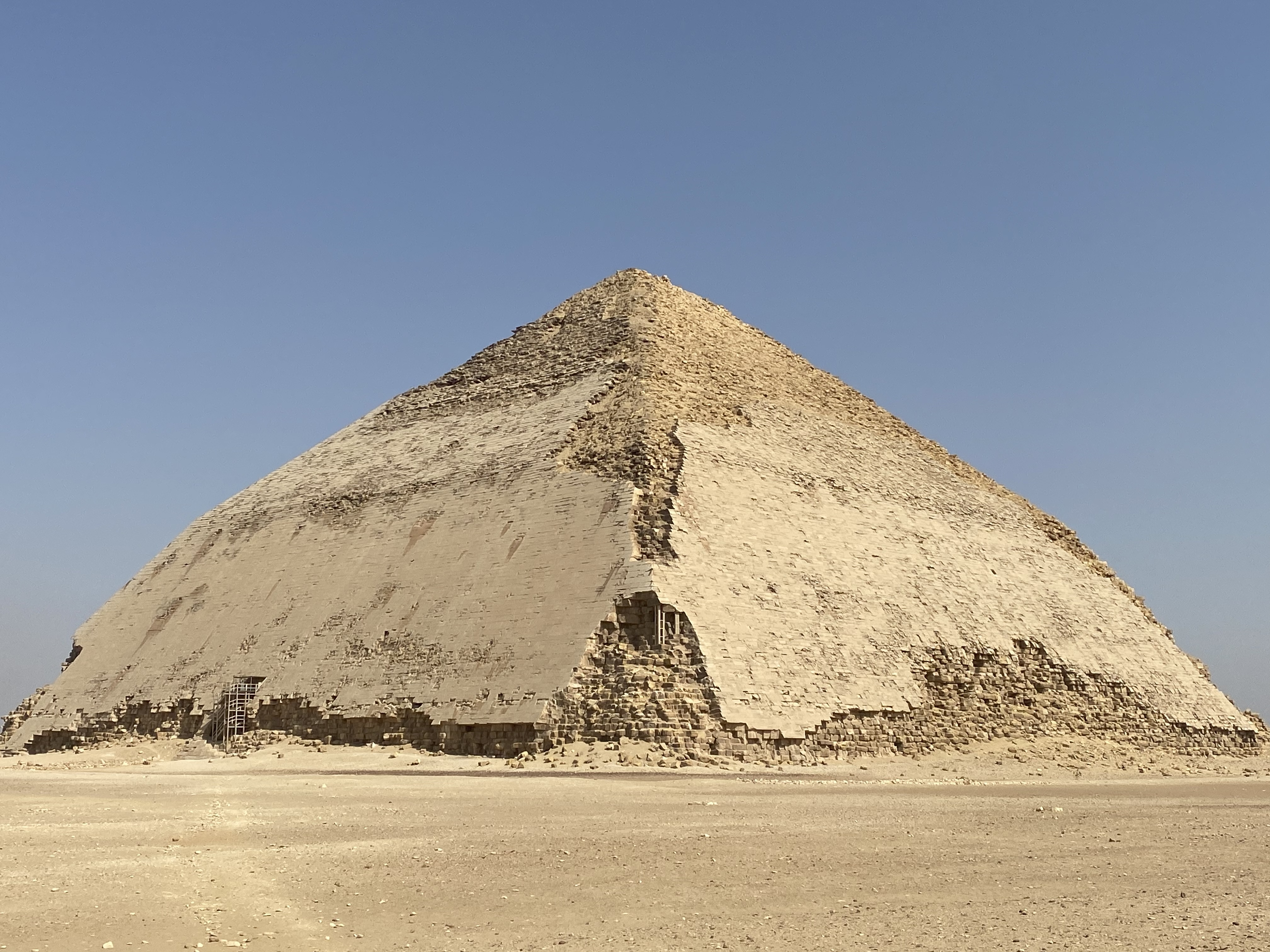
The Bent Pyramid of Snefru at Dahshur (circa 2615 BC)

The main period of pyramid construction began around 2640 BC with the reign of Snefru, who initiated the construction of multiple pyramids that experimented with new designs. His first two pyramids, at Meidum, were of the stepped kind, with its roots in the earlier Third dynasty period and Saqqara. This was followed by a major innovation: the creation of the first true pyramid, with straight surfaces instead of stepped levels, forming a pure geometric form. The first attempt was what later became known as the Bent Pyramid, so-called because part-way through its construction the angle of its sides was reduced when the structure's weight threatened its collapse. The second, successful attempt was what became known as the Red Pyramid. Both are located at Dahshur. In addition to the form of the pyramid, this period also saw innovations in the layout of tomb chambers and refinements in decorative techniques.

=== Giza pyramid complex ===
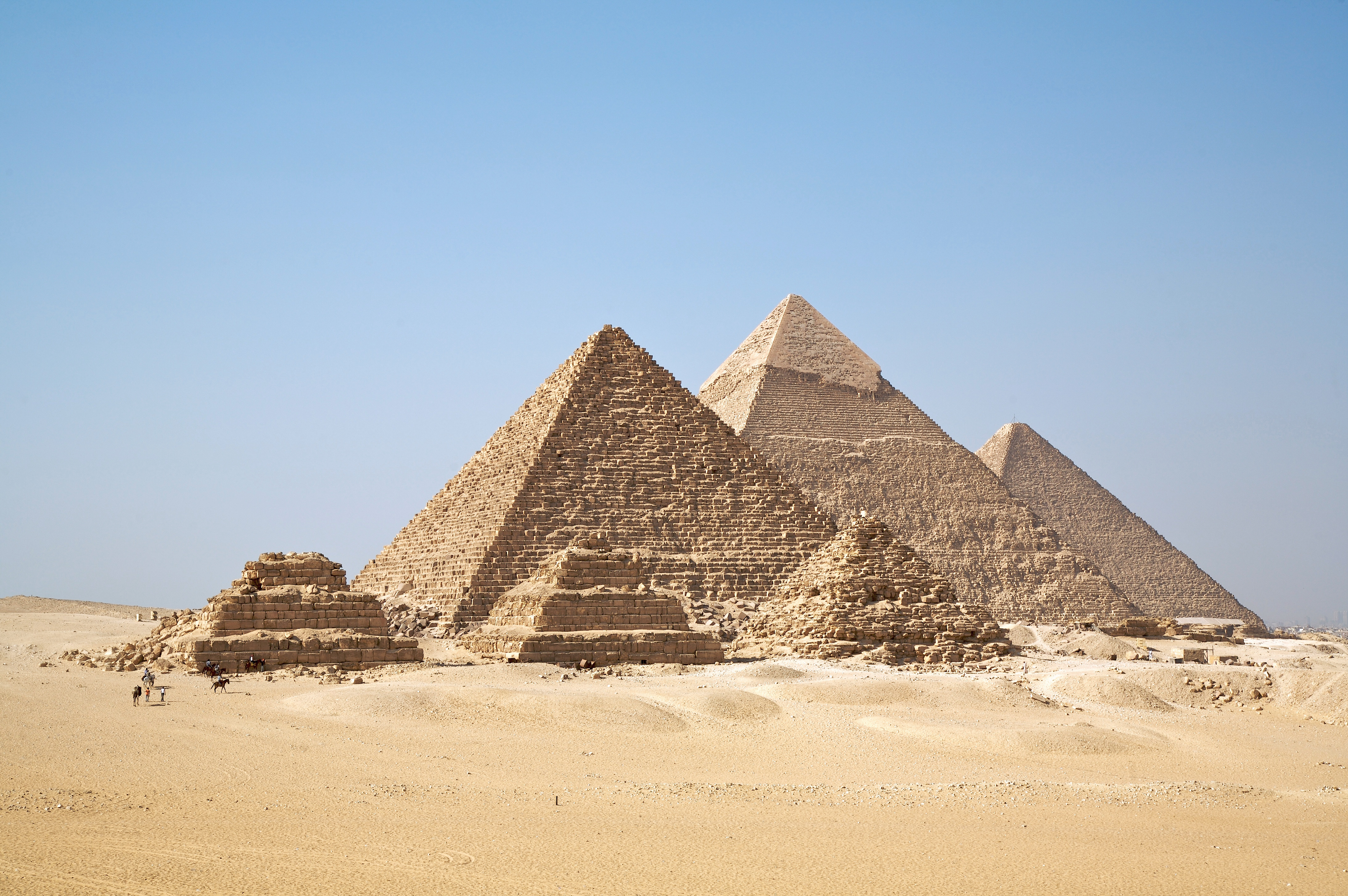
The three main pyramids at Giza, together with subsidiary pyramids and the remains of other structures at the Giza pyramid complex

The Giza Necropolis stands on the Giza Plateau, on the outskirts of Cairo, Egypt. This complex of ancient monuments is located some 8 kilometers (5.0 miles) inland into the desert from the old town of Giza on the Nile, some 20 kilometers (12 miles) southwest of Cairo city center. This ancient Egyptian necropolis consists of the Pyramid of Khufu (also known as the Great Pyramid or the Pyramid of Cheops), the somewhat smaller Pyramid of Khafre (or Kephren/Chefren), and the relatively modest-sized Pyramid of Menkaure (or Mykerinus/Mycerinus), along with a number of smaller satellite edifices, known as "queens" pyramids, the Great Sphinx, as well as a few hundred mastabas and chapels.

The pyramids, which were built in the Fourth Dynasty, testify to the power of the pharaonic religion and state. They were built to serve both as grave sites and also as a way to make their names last forever. The size and simple design show the high skill level of Egyptian design and engineering on a large scale. The Great Pyramid of Giza, which was probably completed c. 2580 BC, is the oldest of the Giza pyramids and the largest pyramid in the world, and is the only surviving monument of the Seven Wonders of the Ancient World.

The pyramid of Khafre is believed to have been completed around 2532 BC, at the end of Khafre's reign. Khafre ambitiously placed his pyramid next to his father's. It is not as tall as his father's pyramid but he was able to give it the impression of appearing taller by building it on a site with a foundation 33 feet (10 m) higher than his father's. Along with building his pyramid, Chefren commissioned the sculpting of the giant Sphinx as guardian over his tomb. The face of a human, possibly a depiction of the pharaoh, on a lion's body was seen as a symbol of divinity among the Greeks fifteen hundred years later. The Great Sphinx is carved out of the limestone bedrock and stands about 65 feet (20 m) tall. Menkaure's pyramid dates to circa 2490 BC and stands 213 feet (65 m) high making it the smallest of the Great Pyramids.

Popular culture leads people to believe that Pyramids are highly confusing, with many tunnels within the pyramid to create confusion for grave robbers. This is not true. The shafts of pyramids are quite simple, mostly leading directly to the tomb. The immense size of the pyramids attracted robbers to the wealth that lay inside which caused the tombs to be robbed relatively soon after they were sealed in some cases.

== New Kingdom ==
=== Luxor Temple ===
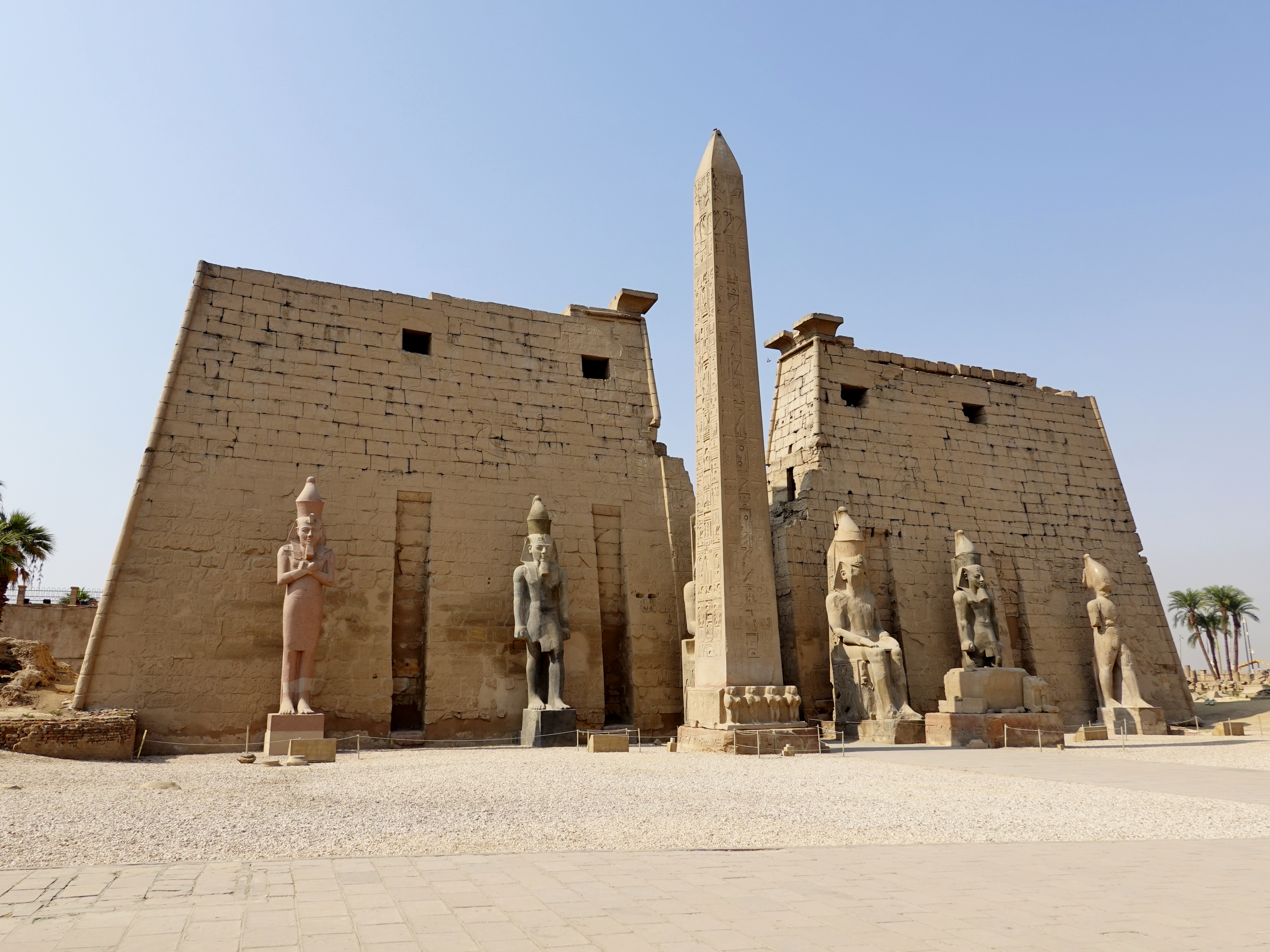
The first pylon at the entrance to Luxor Temple

The Luxor Temple is a huge ancient Egyptian temple complex located on the east bank of the River Nile in the city today known as Luxor (ancient Thebes). Construction work on the temple began during the reign of Amenhotep III in the 14th century BC during the New Kingdom. Horemheb and Tutankhamun added columns, statues, and friezes – and Akhenaten had earlier obliterated his father's cartouches and installed a shrine to the Aten – but the only major expansion effort took place under Ramesses II some 100 years after the first stones were put in place. Luxor is thus unique among the main Egyptian temple complexes in having only two pharaohs leave their mark on its architectural structure.

The temple proper begins with the 24 m (79 ft) high First Pylon, built by Ramesses II. The pylon was decorated with scenes of Ramesses's military triumphs (particularly the Battle of Qadesh); later pharaohs, particularly those of the Kushite dynasty, also recorded their victories there. This main entrance to the temple complex was originally flanked by six colossal statues of Ramesses – four seated, and two standing – but only two (both seated) have survived. Modern visitors can also see a 25 m (82 ft) tall pink granite obelisk: this one of a matching pair until 1835, when the other one was taken to Paris where it now stands in the centre of the Place de la Concorde.

Through the pylon gateway leads into a peristyle courtyard, also built by Ramesses II. This area, and the pylon, were built at an oblique angle to the rest of the temple, presumably to accommodate the three pre-existing barque shrines located in the northwest corner. After the peristyle courtyard comes the processional colonnade built by Amenhotep III – a 100 m (330 ft) corridor lined by 14 papyrus-capital columns. Friezes on the wall describe the stages in the Opet Festival, from sacrifices at Karnak at the top left, through Amun's arrival at Luxor at the end of that wall, and concluding with his return on the opposite side. The decorations were put in place by Tutankhamun: the boy pharaoh is depicted, but his names have been replaced with those of Horemheb.

Beyond the colonnade is a peristyle courtyard, which also dates back to Amenhotep's original construction. The best preserved columns are on the eastern side, where some traces of original color can be seen. The southern side of this courtyard is made up of a 36-column hypostyle court (i.e., a roofed space supported by columns) that leads into the dark inner rooms of the temple.

=== Temple of Karnak ===
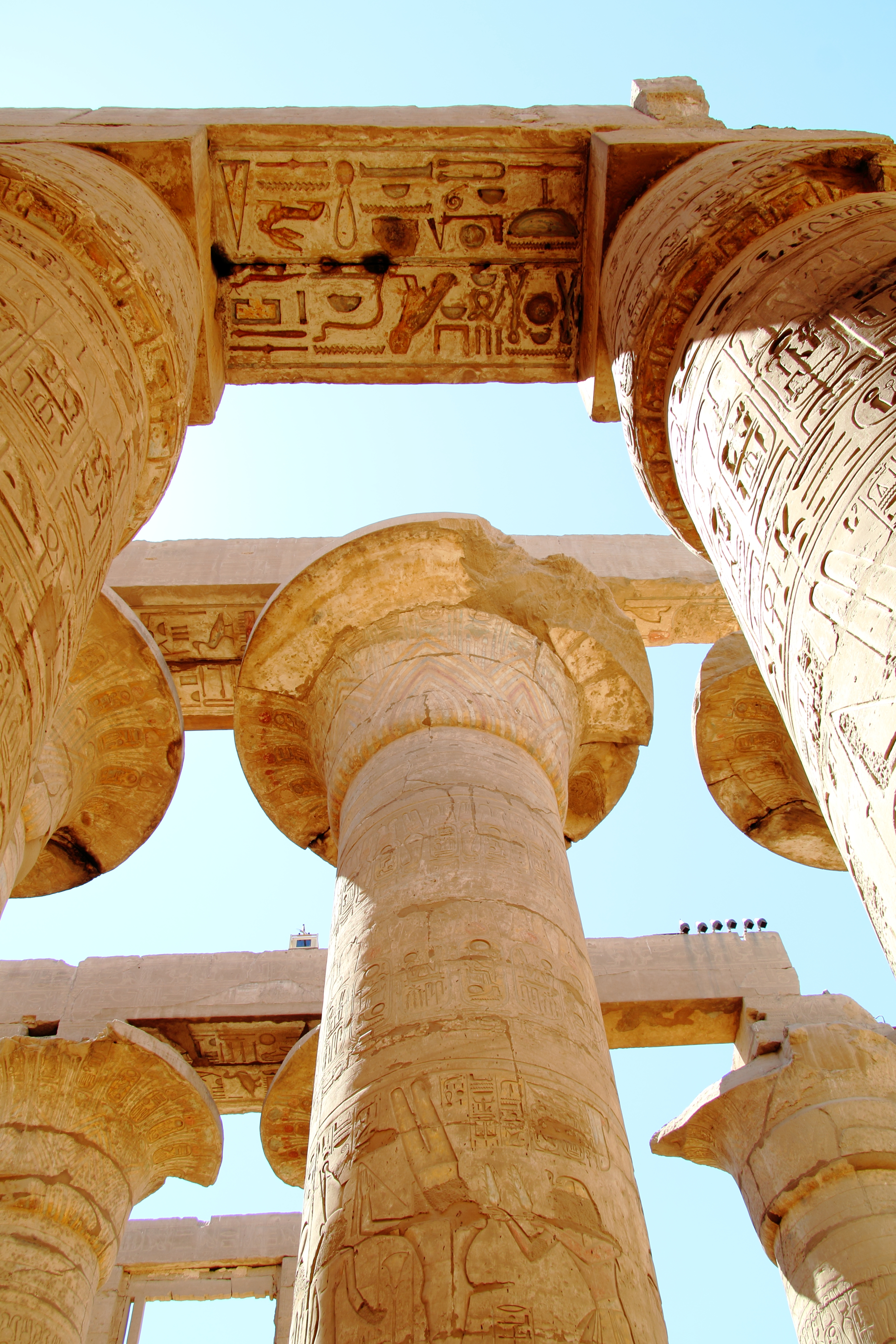
Example of inscriptions present throughout the Karnak complex, seen here in the Great Hypostyle Hall. The upper regions are painted, suggesting (in canon with other such temples) that the remaining columns and ceilings would have been brightly painted. The temple roof, representing the heavens, often bore images of stars and birds, while the columns often bore images of palms, lotuses, and people.

The temple complex of Karnak is located on the banks of the Nile River some 2.5 kilometers (1.6 miles) north of Luxor. It consists of four main parts, Precinct of Amon-Re, the Precinct of Montu, the Precinct of Mut, and the Temple of Amenhotep IV (dismantled), as well as a few smaller temples and sanctuaries located outside the enclosing walls of the four main parts, and several avenues of ram-headed sphinxes connecting the Precinct of Mut, the Precinct of Amon-Re, and Luxor Temple. This temple complex is particularly significant, for many rulers (notably every ruler of the New Kingdom) have added to it. The site covers over 80 hectares (200 acres) and consists of a series of pylons, leading into courtyards, halls, chapels, obelisks, and smaller temples. The key difference between Karnak and most of the other temples and sites in Egypt is the length of time over which it was developed and used. Construction work began in the 16th century BC, and was originally quite modest in size, but eventually, in the main precinct alone, as many as twenty temples and chapels would be constructed. Approximately 30 pharaohs contributed to the buildings, enabling it to reach a size, complexity and diversity not seen elsewhere. Few of the individual features of Karnak are unique, but the size and number of those features are overwhelming.

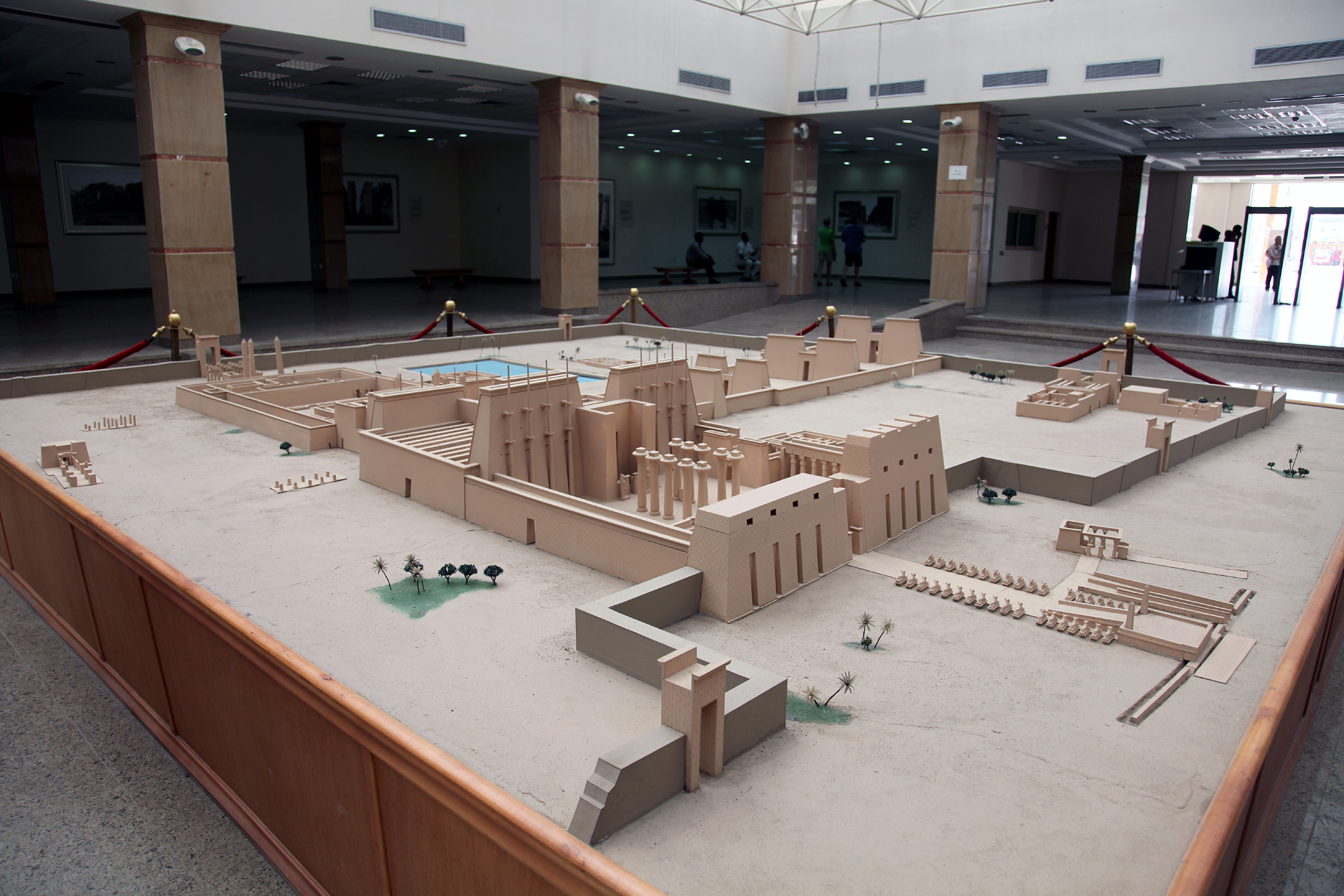
Recreation of the temple complex, at Karnak visitor center

One of the greatest temples in Egyptian history is that of Amun-Ra at Karnak. As with many other temples in Egypt, this one honors the gods and details the feats of the past (including thousands of years of history depicted by inscriptions on many of the walls and columns found on site, often modified or completely erased and redone by following rulers). The temple of Amun-Re was constructed in three sections, the third being constructed by late New Kingdom pharaohs. In canon with the traditional style of Egyptian architecture, many of the architectural features, such as the inner sanctum of the complex, were aligned with the sunset of the summer solstice.

One of the architectural features present at the site is the 5,000 sq m (50,000 sq ft) hypostyle hall built during the Ramesside period. The hall is supported by approximately 139 sandstone and mud brick columns, with 12 central columns (25 meters (82 feet) tall) that would have all been brightly painted.

=== Ramesseum ===
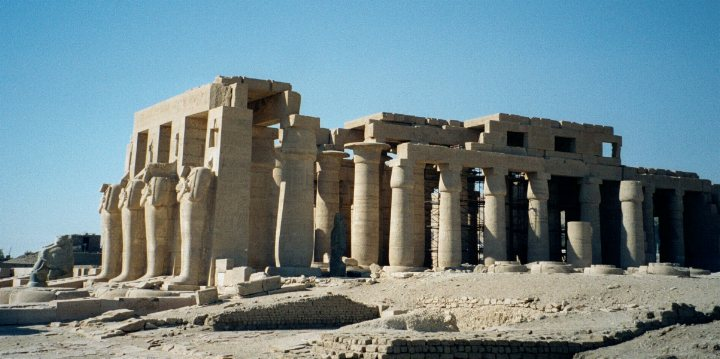
Ramesses' mortuary temple adheres to standard New Kingdom temple-architecture style. Oriented northwest to southeast, the temple entrance comprises a number of stone figures, one located horizontally to the next. At center of the complex was a covered 48-column hypostyle hall, surrounding the inner sanctuary.

Ramesses II, a 19th Dynasty pharaoh, ruled Egypt from around 1279 to 1213 BCE. Among his many accomplishments, such as the expansion of Egypt's borders, he constructed a massive temple called the Ramesseum, located near Thebes, then the capital of the New Kingdom. The Ramesseum was a magnificent temple, complete with monumental statues to guard its entrance. The most impressive was a statue of Ramses himself, originally 19 metres (62 ft) tall and approximately 1,000 tons. The base and torso are all that remain of this impressive statue of the enthroned pharaoh. The temple features impressive reliefs, many detailing a number of Ramses' military victories, such as the Battle of Kadesh (ca. 1274 BCE) and the pillaging of the city of "Shalem".

The Ramesseum was built to be a place of worship for Ramesses II. Although there are only traces left of its former structure, the Ramesseum was not only a temple, but it included a palace, too. The Ramesseum was more than those, however. Not only was it a place of worship, but it also had other rooms used for catering to the needs of the people, such as, bakeries, kitchens, and supply rooms, which were found in the southern part of the temple during an excavation. There was also a school where boys were taught to become scribes, which was located in the area between the kitchen and palace. There were other burials that were built in the Ramesseum after it was ruined as well. The Ramesseum was originally built for Ramesses II, but after it was ruined, the Ramesseum was given to certain families of the 22nd dynasty, who then placed the second burials in the chambers and used it as a cemetery of sort. There have been many restorations done to the Ramesseum as well, with one being the installation of a Ramesses II's colossus head on a plinth and bracing it after it was found lying on the ground. Another was for areas that were made out of mud bricks. These areas were restored by covering them with modern bricks that were made of the same material but are stronger than the mud bricks so they would be able to hold against natural elements, such as torrential rain.

=== Temple of Malkata ===
Under the tenure of Amenhotep III workers constructed over 250 buildings and monuments. One of the most impressive building projects was the temple complex of Malkata, known among the ancient Egyptians as the "house of rejoicing", was constructed to serve his royal residence on the west bank of Thebes, just south of the Theban necropolis. The site is approximately 226,000 square meters (or 2,432,643 square feet). Given the immense size of the site, along with its many buildings, courts, parade grounds, and housing, it is considered to have served not just as a temple and dwelling of the Pharaoh but a town.

The central area of the complex consisted in the Pharaoh's apartments that were made up of a number of rooms and courts, all of which were oriented around a columned banquet hall. Accompanying the apartments, that presumably housed the royal cohort and foreign guests, was a large throne room connected to smaller chambers, for storage, waiting, and smaller audiences. The greater elements of this area of the complex are what have been come to be called the West Villas (just west of the King's Palace), the North Palace and Village, and Temple.

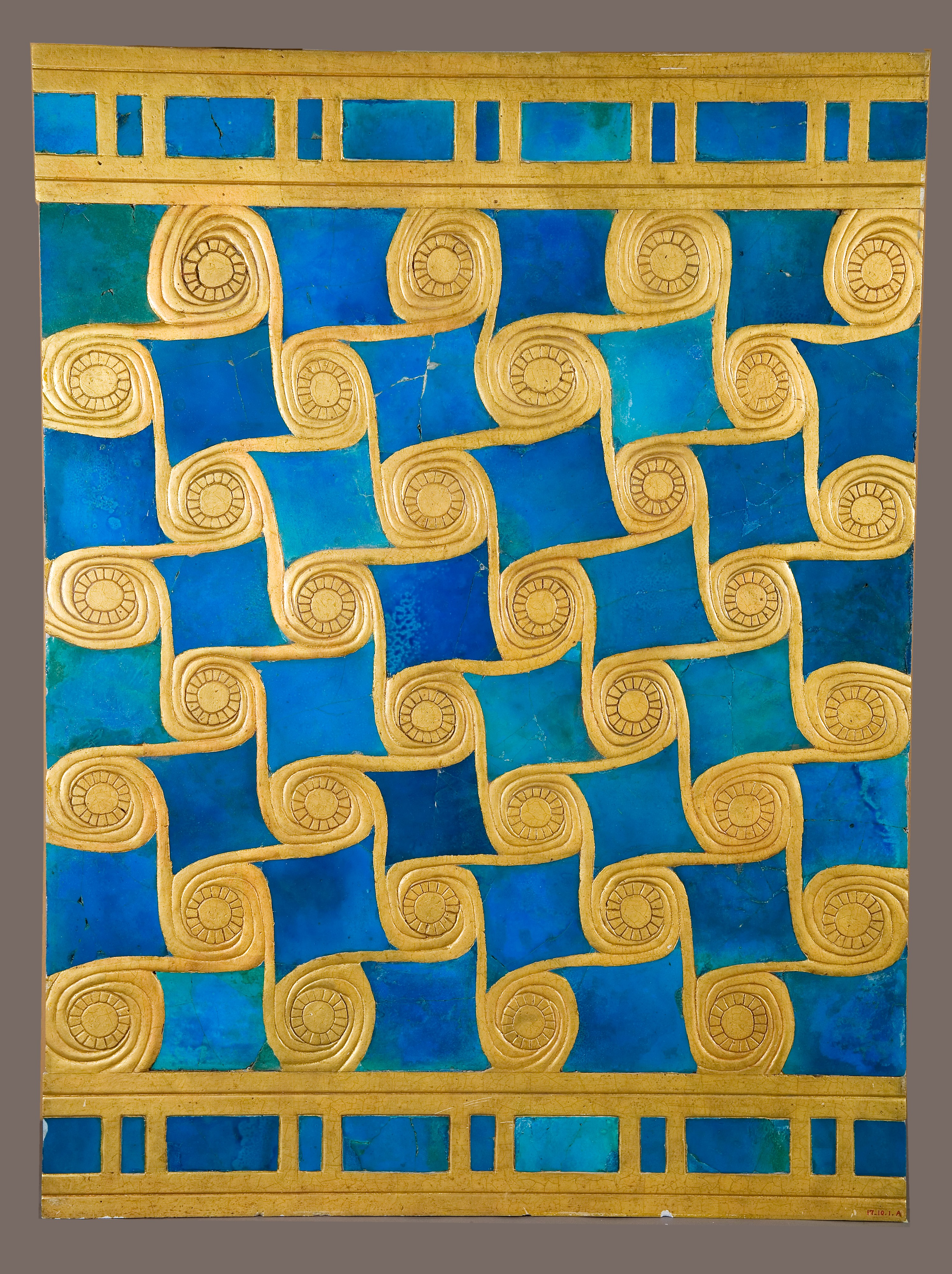
The faience (glazed ceramic earthenware) tile (above) is a reconstruction of wall decoration fragments found at the Temple of Malkata in stacks at the southwest corner. The gold spirals here were painted with gold paint, whereas the originals would have probably been covered by gold foil. Notably, similar patterns are found in the Pharaoh's Palace.

The temple's external dimensions are approximately 183.5 by 110.5 m, and consists of two parts: the large forecourt and the temple proper. The large front court is 131.5 by 105.5 m, oriented on the east–west axis, and occupies the east part of the temple complex. The western part of the court is on a higher level and is divided from the rest of the court by a low retaining wall. The lower court is almost square, whereas the upper terrace was rectangular in shape. The upper section of the court was paved with mud bricks and has a 4 m wide entrance to it from the lower part of the fore-court, connecting the base to the upper landing was a ramp enclosed by walls. This ramp and entrance were both at the center of the temple, with the same orientation as the front court entrance and the temple proper.

The temple proper might be seen as divided in to three distinct parts: central, north, and south. The central part is indicated by a small rectangular anteroom (6.5 by 3.5 m), many of the door jambs including those of the antechamber include inscriptions, such as 'given life like Ra forever'. A 12.5 by 14.5 m hall follows the anteroom from which is entered via a 3.5 m wide door in the center of the front wall of the hall. There is evidence the ceiling of this chamber was decorated with yellow stars on blue background, whereas the walls today show only the appearance of a white stucco over mud plaster. Notwithstanding, we might speculate given the numerous decorative plaster fragments found within the room's deposit that these too were ornately decorated with various images and patterns. Supporting the ceiling are six columns arranged in two rows with east–west axis. Only small fragments of the column bases have survived, though they suggest the diameter of these columns to have been about 2.25 m. The columns are placed 2.5 m away from the walls and in each row the columns are approximately 1.4 m away from the next, while the space between the two rows is 3 m.

A second hall (12.5 by 10 m) is accessed by a 3 m door at the center of the back wall of the first. The second hall is similar to the first, first its ceiling seems to have been decorated with similar if not identical patterns and images as the first. Second, in the same way the ceiling is supported by columns, four to be precise, ordered in two rows on the same axis as those of the first hall, with a 3 m wide space between them. In hall two, at-least one of the rooms appears to have been dedicated to the cult of Maat, which suggests the other three in this area might have likewise served such a religious purpose.

The southern part of the temple may be divided into two sections: western and southern. The western section consists of 6 rooms, whereas the southern area given its size (19.5 by 17.2 m) suggests it might have served as another open court. In many of these rooms were found blue ceramic tiles inlaid with gold around their edge. The Northern part of the temple proper consists of ten rooms, similar in style to those of the southern.

The temple itself seems to have been dedicated to the Egyptian deity Amun, given the number of bricks stamped with various inscriptions, such as "the temple of Amun in the house of Rejoicing" or "Nebmaarta in the Temple of Amun in the house of Rejoicing". Overall the temple of Malakata shares many with other cult temples of the New Kingdom, with magnificent halls and religiously oriented rooms with many others more closely resemble store rooms.

=== Valley of the Kings ===
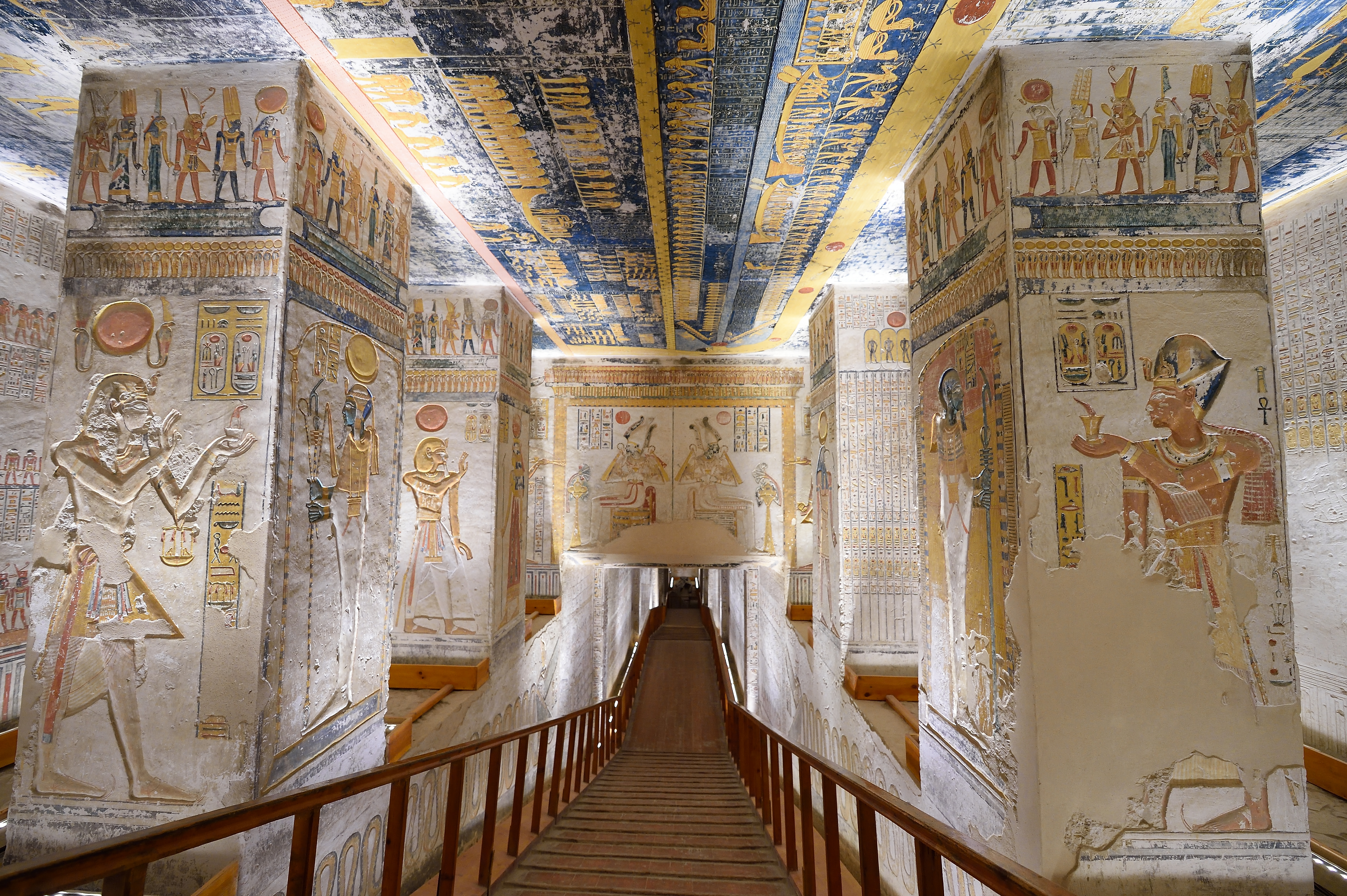
Decoration in the Tomb of Ramses V and Ramses VI (c. 1145 BC) in the Valley of Kings

While the New Kingdom continued the tradition of establishing a funerary cult for deceased pharaohs in dedicated monumental temples, the pharaohs themselves were no longer buried in large, highly visible monuments like the ancient pyramids. Both the Old Kingdom and Middle Kingdom funerary monuments were plundered and thus had failed to protect the bodies of the pharaohs in their afterlife. Starting with the Eighteenth Dynasty, the pharaohs were instead buried in hidden underground tombs inside the Valley of the Kings near Thebes.

These tombs were excavated directly into the rock of the valley slopes. Their precise layouts varied over time, but they generally involved a corridor organized into multiple sections leading to a tomb chamber. Initially, only the burial chamber was decorated, but eventually the walls of the entire tomb were richly decorated with illustrations and texts.

== Greco-Roman period ==
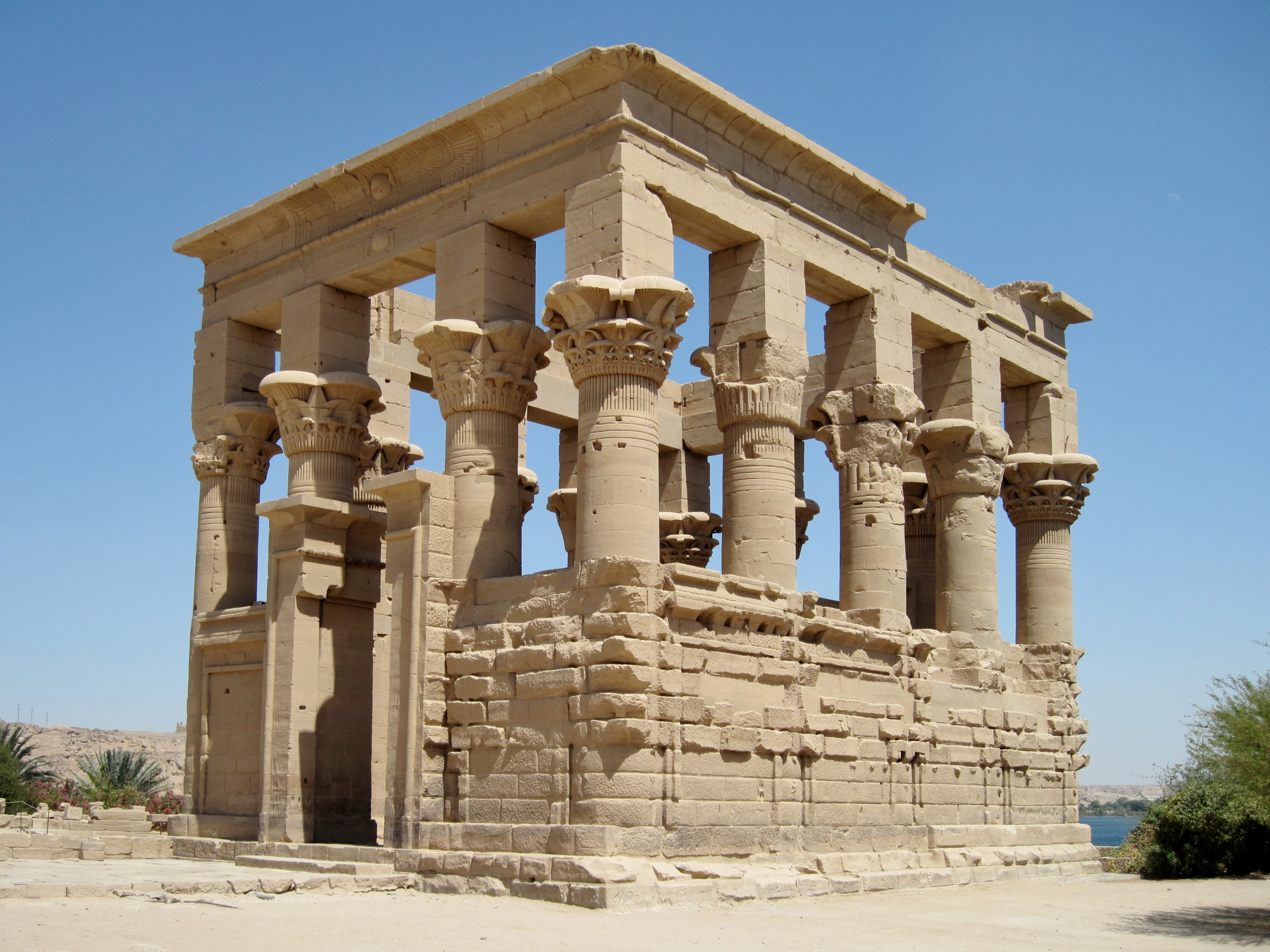
Trajan's Kiosk at Philae (c. 100 AD), Roman period

During the Greco-Roman period of Egypt (332 BC–395 AD), when Egypt was ruled by the Greek Ptolemaic dynasty and then the Roman Empire, Egyptian architecture underwent significant changes due to the influence of Greek architecture. Although the rulers were new, they maintained a strong respect for native Egyptian religion and built many new temples or expanded old ones.

The capital of the country was moved to the recently founded city of Alexandria on the shores of the Mediterranean. Its plan was largely that of a Greek city, with local elements mixed in. Most of the city has disappeared under the water or under the modern city today, but it was known from descriptions to contain many great buildings including a royal palace, the Musaeum, the Library of Alexandria, and the famous Pharos Lighthouse.

Many well-preserved temples in Upper Egypt date from this era, such as the Temple of Edfu, the Temple of Kom Ombo, and the Philae temple complex. While temple architecture remained more traditionally Egyptian, new Greco-Roman influences are evident, such as the appearance of Composite capitals. Egyptian motifs also made their way into wider Greek and Roman architecture.

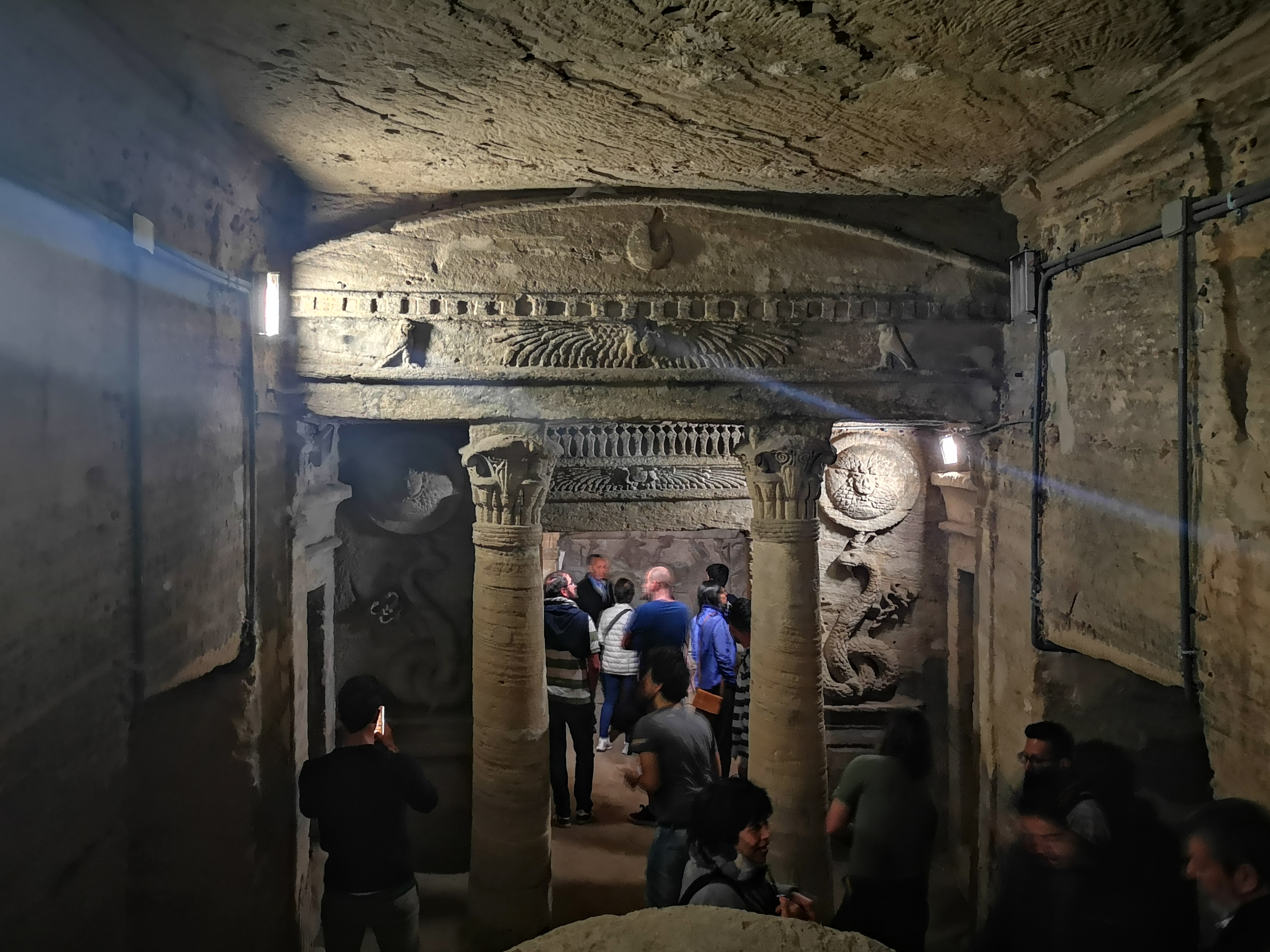
Catacombs of Kom El Shoqafa in Alexandria (1st to 3rd centuries AD), Roman period

Much of the period's funerary architecture has not survived, though some of Alexandria's underground catacombs, shared by the city's inhabitants to bury their dead, have been preserved. They feature a hybrid architectural style in which both classical and Egyptian decoration are mixed together. The Catacombs of Kom El Shoqafa, begun in the 1st century AD and continuously enlarged until the 3rd century, are one notable example and can be visited today.

== Fortresses ==
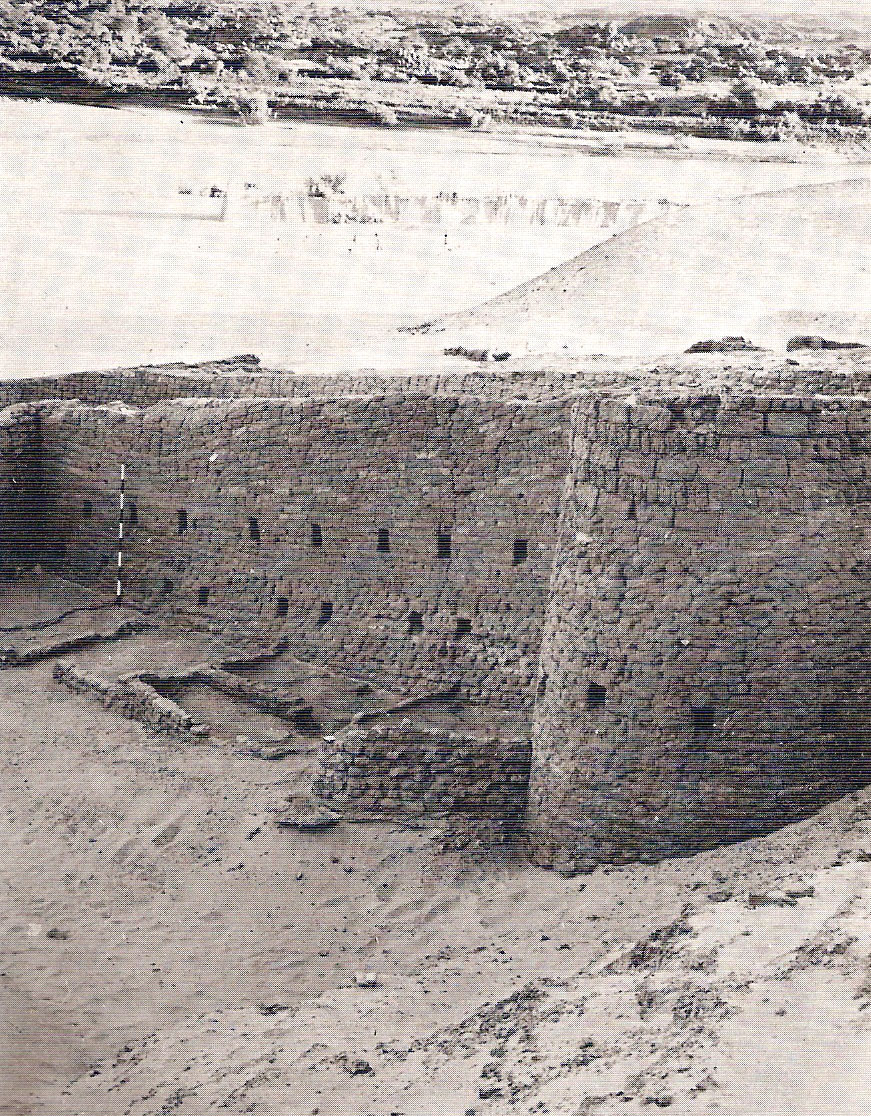
Ramparts at Mirgissa, Nubia

Fortifications within Ancient Egypt were built in times of conflict between rival principalities. Out of all fortresses analyzed within this time frame, most (if not all) were built of the same materials. The only exception to the rule were some fortresses from the Old Kingdom as fortresses such as the fort of Buhen utilized stone with the creation of its walls. The main walls were mainly built with mud brick but were reinforced with other materials such as timber. Rocks were also utilized to not only preserve them from erosion as well as paving. Secondary walls would be built outside of fortresses main walls and were relatively close to one another. As a result, this would prove to be a challenge to invaders as they were forced to destroy this fortification before they could reach the main walls of the fort. Another strategy was utilized if the enemy managed to break through the first barrier. Upon making it to the main wall, a ditch would be constructed that would be positioned between the secondary and first walls. The purpose of this was to place the enemy in a position that would leave them exposed to the enemy, making the invaders susceptible to arrow fire. The position of this ditch walls within the interior of fortresses would become demilitarized during times of unity; leading to them being demolished. The parts that were used to construct said walls could then be reused, making the overall design extremely beneficial.

Fortresses within ancient Egypt held multiple functions. During the Middle Kingdom Period, the Twelfth Dynasty of Egypt would establish means of control throughout the Nubian Riverside by creating fortified stations. The location of Egyptian fortresses were not exclusive to just the riverside. Sites within both Egypt and Nubia would be placed on terrain that was either rocky or sandy. The purpose behind this method was to spread its influence throughout the region as well as discourage rival groups from raiding the sites. Inspections of these forts in Nubia have led to the discovery of copper smelting materials, which suggest a relationship with miners in the region. The occupation of these Nubian forts suggests a trade relationship between the two parties. Miners would collect the materials and would transfer them to these forts in exchange for food and water. Up until the Thirteenth dynasty, Egypt would maintain control of Nubia through the use of these fortresses.

=== Pelusium Fortress ===
The Pelusium fortress served as means of protection for the Nile Delta from invaders. While the site served this role for more than a millennium, Pelusium was also known for being a center of trade (both land and maritime). Trade was primarily conducted between Egypt and the Levant. While information is not concrete in terms of the fortress's establishment, it is suggested that Pelusium was erected during either the Middle Kingdom period or during the Saite and Persian periods from the 8th to 6th century BC. Pelusium is also seen as an integral part of the Nile as other ruins were found outside its borders, indicating that the area was large in occupation. Architecturally, structures of Pelusium (such as its gates and towers) appear to be built from limestone. A metallurgy industry is also indicated to have taken place at this site due to the discovery of copper-ore. Excavations of the site have also discovered older materials that date back to some of the early dynasties, and include basalt, granite, diorite, marble, and quartzite. These materials may, however, have been of more recent origin. The fortress was constructed in close proximity to the Nile River, and was largely surrounded by both dunes and coastlines.

There are multiple reasons that caused the decline of the Pelusium fortress. During its existence, events such as the Bubonic Plague appeared in the Mediterranean for the first time and multiple fires within the fortress occurred. Conquest by the Persians as well as a decrease in trade also may have led to an increase in abandonment. Officially, natural reasons are what led to Pelusium falling apart such as tectonic motions. The official desertion of the site is attributed to the time of the crusades.

=== Fortress of Jaffa ===
Jaffa Fortress was prominent during the New Kingdom period of Egypt. It served as both a fortress and a port on the Mediterranean coast. To this day, Jaffa serves as a primary Israeli port. Originally under the control of the Canaanites, the site fell under the control of the Egyptian Empire. During the Late Bronze Age, the site was successfully used as a base for campaigns of 18th dynasty Pharaohs. In terms of its functions, the site held multiple roles. It is suggested that Jaffa's primary function was to serve as a granary for the Egyptian Army.

Rameses gate, which is dated to the Late Bronze Age, serves as a connection to the fortress. Ramparts were also discovered with the fortress. Upon excavation, the site hosted multiple items such as bowls, imported jars, pot stands, and beer and bread which further emphasizes the importance of these items to the area. The discovery of these objects show a close connection between the storing of food and the creation of ceramic items.

== Transformation and later use ==
=== Reuse and spolia ===
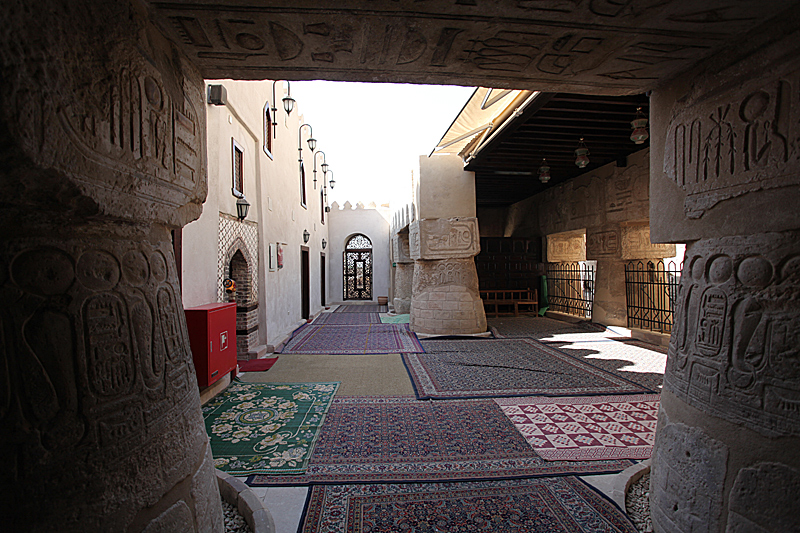
The Abu Haggag Mosque is integrated into the ancient Luxor temple

After the advent of Roman rule, some temples were also repurposed for new uses. The Luxor Temple, for example, became the center of a Roman military camp and parts of the temple were dedicated to the worship of the divine emperor. The southern part of the temple was later transformed into a Christian church and the Mosque of Abu Haggag was attached to the east side of the temple during the Islamic period.

Stones and architectural elements from ancient Egyptian monuments were often used as spolia for later constructions. A number of medieval mosques, for example, incorporate ancient stone blocks with still-visible hieroglyphic carvings. As early as the Roman period and as late as the 19th century, many ancient Egyptian obelisks were also reappropriated and transported to other countries, where they were often re-erected as prized monuments.

=== Modern revivalism ===
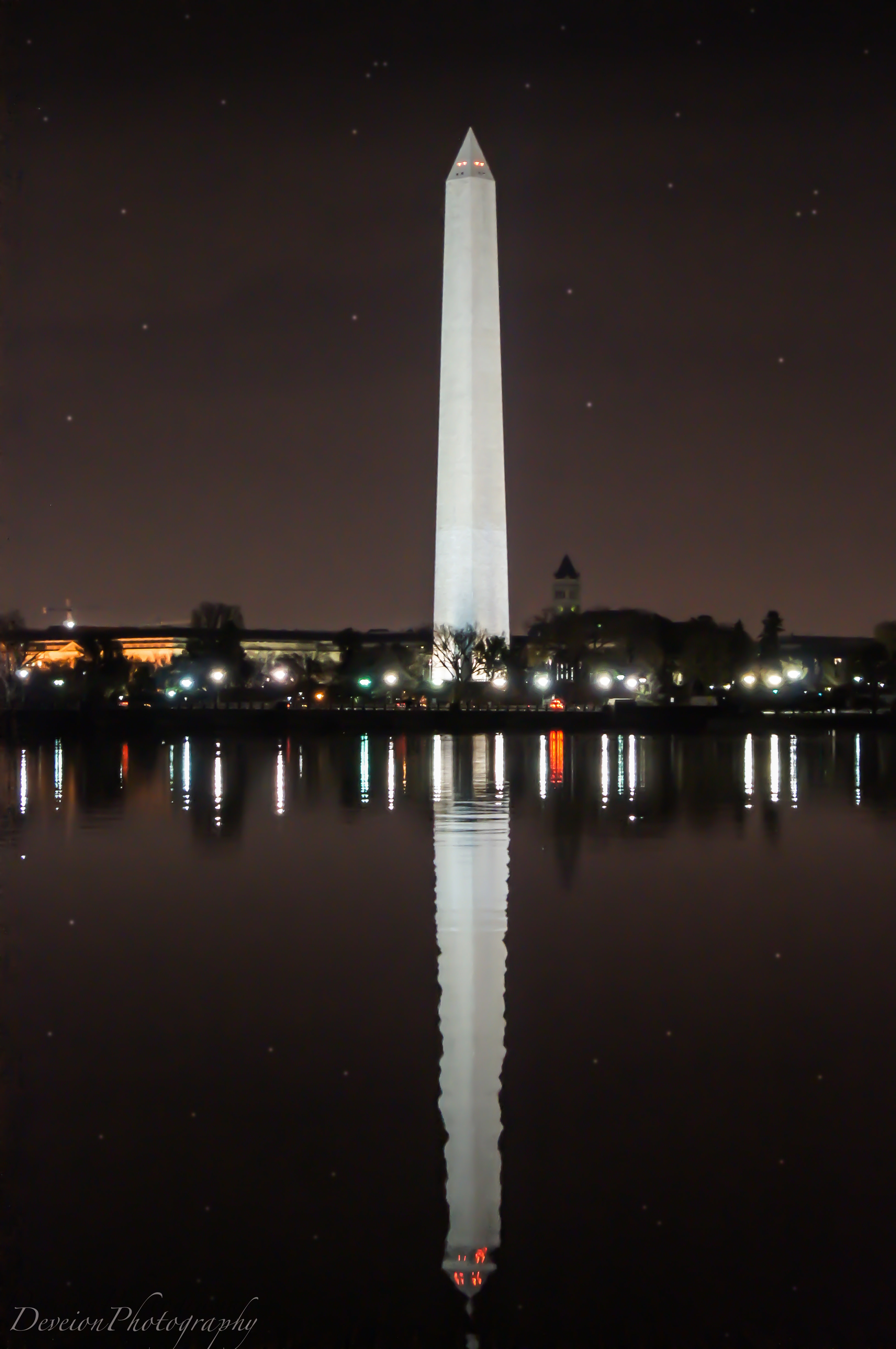
The Washington Monument, a modern monument in Egyptian obelisk style.

In the 19th and 20th centuries Egyptian architectural motifs were used for modern architecture, giving rise to Egyptian Revival architecture and later particularly Egyptian Theater cinemas and other themed entertainment places.

== See also ==
- Art of ancient Egypt
- Center for Documentation of Cultural and Natural Heritage
- Coptic architecture
- Egyptian Revival decorative arts
- Urban planning in ancient Egypt
- List of ancient Egyptian sites
