= Archeological Map of Egypt =

The Archeological Map of Egypt is an archeological Geographical Information System (GIS) documenting Egyptian archaeological sites at the national, site, and monument levels.

== Background ==
The overwhelming number of sites, monuments and artifacts scattered across Egypt, and the ever-increasing pace of urbanization around archaeological sites as well as environmental hazards pose challenges to the conservation and management of Egypt’s archaeological heritage.

== Implementation ==
The Archeological Map of Egypt program is meant to provide a documentation and management tool for the Egyptian archaeological sites that are spread all over the country. It divides the information of the archaeological sites into three levels: National, Sites, and Monuments. Using multimedia technologies in conjunction with the GIS, it documents the archeological and geographical details of each monument.

== Publications ==
The Archeological Map of Egypt program has published a series of atlases intended to cover all archaeological sites in Egypt, within the Center for Documentation of Cultural and Natural Heritage Collaboration. The Center received the first prize for innovative use of technology, in the Stockholm Challenge in 2004, for its work called The Archeological Map of Egypt. All archaeological sites within Sharqia Governorate areas are accurately defined on small scale maps, providing a detailed and precise database.
