= Center for Documentation of Cultural and Natural Heritage =

Scientific cultural center in Smart Village, Egypt

Center for Documentation of Cultural and Natural Heritage (CULTNAT)
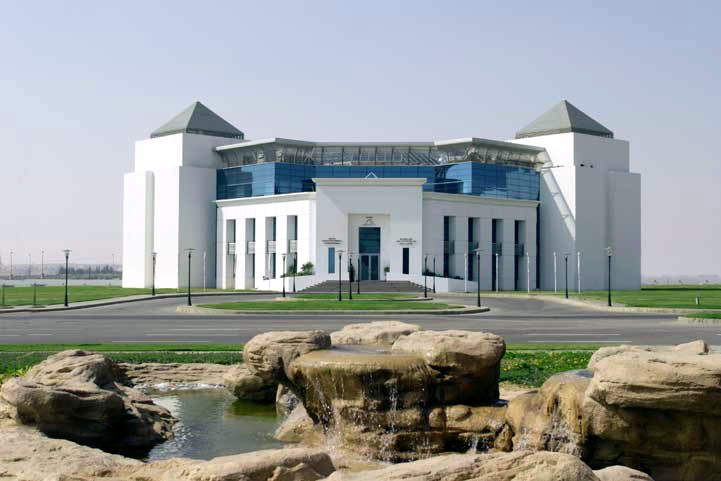
- CULTNAT premises
- Motto: "The Art of Documenting Heritage"
- Established: October 1, 2000
- Staff: 120
- Location: Smart Village, Kilo 28, Cairo-Alex Desert Road, Giza, Egypt
- Website: http://www.cultnat.org

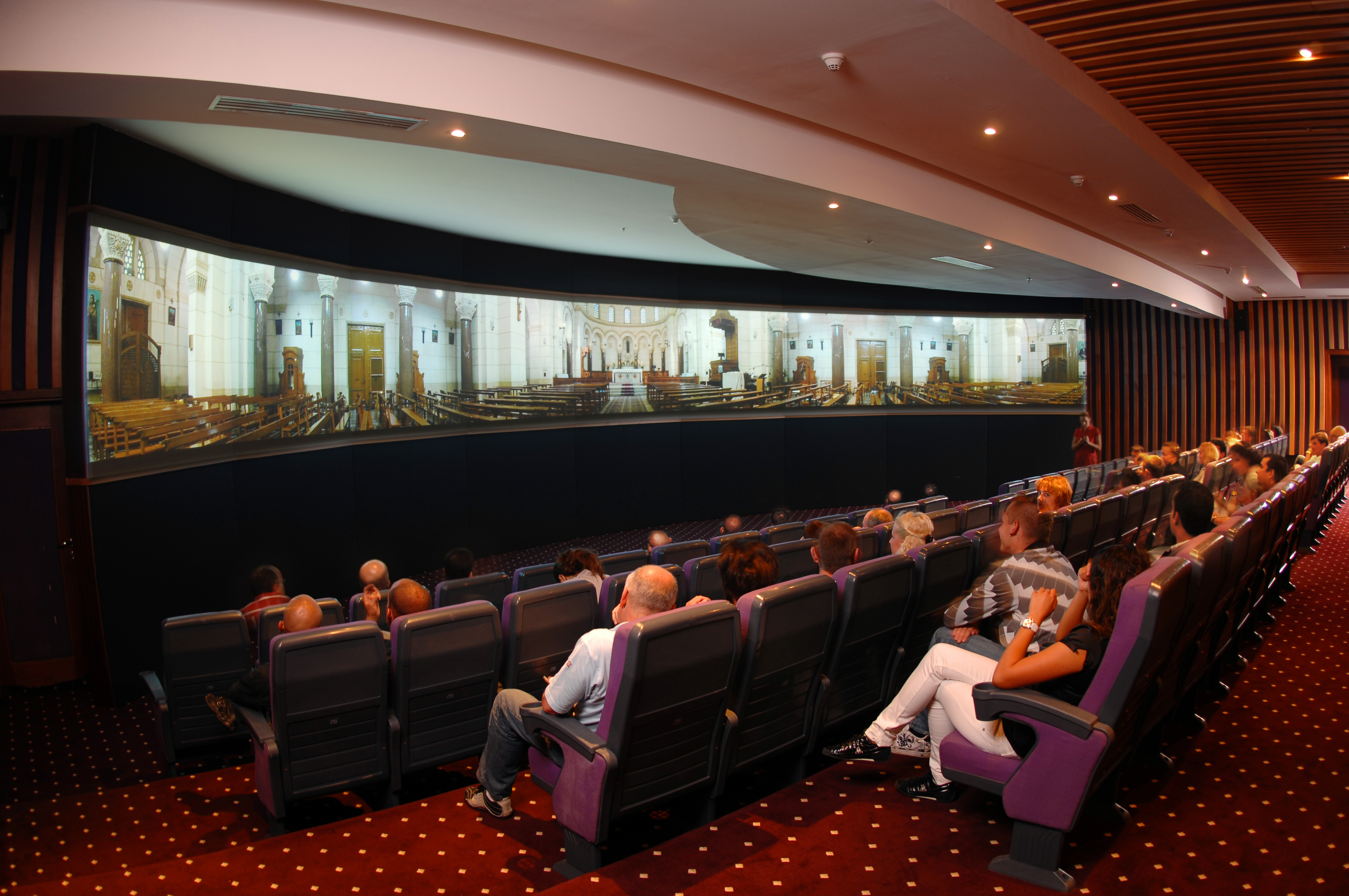
CULTURAMA show

The Center for Documentation of Cultural and Natural Heritage (CULTNAT) of the Cultural Outreach Sector of the Bibliotheca Alexandrina plays a role in documenting Egypt's cultural heritage in its tangible and intangible aspects, besides Egypt's natural heritage from protectorates and wildlife. The center has contributed, for nearly two decades, to documenting and disseminating information related to heritage through the implementation of many projects for digital documentation of Egyptian heritage using the latest information technology in cooperation with specialized local and international bodies and the center is keen to increase awareness of cultural and natural heritage and the Egyptian identity by benefiting from various media channels. CULTNAT also builds the capacities of workers in the field of documenting and preserving civilizational and natural heritage. It was established in 2000, and is located in Smart Village.

CULTNAT is involved in a large number of domestic and international programs, including the Architectural Heritage And Urban Planning Documentation -Architectural Heritage of Egypt Project, a pilot project focused on the historical Downtown Cairo district.

In partnership with the center, IBM created a multi-language educational site featuring Egypt's rich history, called Eternal Egypt. The center collects, organizes, and compiles information into databases and produces educational films.

The center received the first prize for innovative use of technology in the 2004 Stockholm Challenge for its work called The Archaeological Map of Egypt.

The center received honorable mention for a work called The Temple of Dendera. CultNat created an educational website called The Global Egyptian Museum that can be used by teachers in their classrooms.

In 2006, the center digitized the photographic work of Lehnert & Landrock, photographers who had documented Egypt in the early 20th century.

In 2011, the center created a photographic exhibition called PME, and displayed Egypt's heritage with photos and mementos.

In 2015, the center published the memoirs of Egyptologist Selim Hassan.

A branch of the center called Hathor House was slated to open in Serabit el-Khadim in South Sinai in 2013.
