= Chapelle Rouge =

Religious site in Egypt, made by the pharaoh Hatshepsut

- 25°43′14″N 32°39′27″E
- Type: Shrine
- Location: Luxor, Luxor Governorate, Egypt

History
- Built: Built; c. 1450 BC; Destroyed; c. 1440 BC; Rebuilt; 1997

Site notes
- Material: Quartzite
- Height: c. 5.5 meters
- Length: c. 18 meters
- Width: c. 6 meters

The Red Chapel of Hatshepsut or the Chapelle rouge was a religious shrine in Ancient Egypt.

The chapel was originally constructed as a barque shrine during the reign of Hatshepsut. She was the fifth pharaoh of the 18th Dynasty from around 1479 to 1458 BC. It was demolished in antiquity and its parts reused in other projects. However, following its rediscovery in modern time, the Chapel was rebuilt in 1997 using its original materials.

The chapel's original location may have been in the central court of the temple of Amun at Karnak, near Thebes. Alternatively, it might have been situated between the two obelisks of Hatshepsut. It is also thought that Hatshepsut erected several smaller chapels and the Chambers of Hatshepsut behind the chapel.

== Background ==
Ancient Egyptians believed that a sacred barque was used in a nightly journey of the sun deity, traveling from the western horizon at sunset behind the earth to the eastern horizon where the sunrise would occur. During the early eighteenth dynasty, the sun deity was Amun. During religious ceremonies the deity would be transported from one temple or section of a temple complex to another in a model which the pharaoh and other religious leaders kept for such religious ceremonies. The chapel would have been its sacred temple.

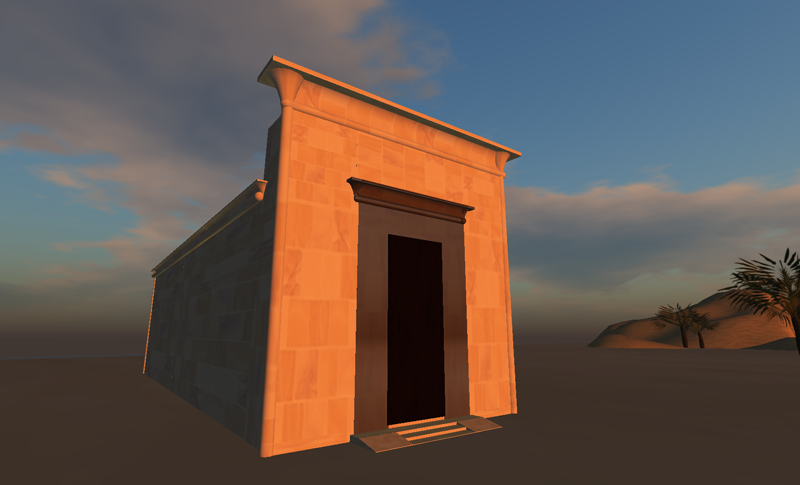
A 3D model of the Chapelle rouge in Second Life

A barque also was believed to transport the dead to the afterlife and royal ones would carry the pharaoh on a journey to become a deity. Eventually, in addition to the reliefs and paintings of barques, model copies were placed in the tombs of pharaohs, royalty, and all who could afford to provide one for their burial.

The chapel consists of two open courts and is around 18 m (59 ft) long, 6 m (20 ft) wide, and 5.5 m (18 ft) high. Its upper portion is made of red quartzite (hence the name); the foundation is built of black diorite. Black granite and grey diorite also were used in its construction. In the center of the first of three courts contained in the chapel, is a basin, probably used to hold a model of a barque. In the center of the inner court, two rectangular stone slabs mark places where statues or barques might have been placed.

The chapel was erected at the temple of Karnak in the sanctuary of Amun-Ra and placed immediately in front of a mud-brick and limestone temple remaining from the Middle Kingdom. To the north and south of the Chapel stood a collection of smaller sandstone cult shrines known as the Hatshepsut Suite, whose decorations showed Hatshepsut making offerings to the deities. The chapel consisted of two rooms, a vestibule, and a sanctuary, which were raised on a diorite platform and could be accessed using short ramps on either side. The purpose of the chapel was to house the Userhat-Amun, the barque believed to be used by the deity Amun to travel about on festival days.

The Userhat-Amun was a small-scale wooden boat covered in gold that bore an enclosed shrine in which the Amun statue was placed to be protected from the public view. On holy days, the statue of Amun would be placed on the barque and carried in procession from Karnak on the shoulders of priests. When the statue of Amun was not traveling, however, the barque rested in its own shrine. During the early New Kingdom, the barque had become an increasingly important aspect of Egyptian theology and barque shrines were built for many temples. During the reign of Hatshepsut, the Chapel was the prominent barque shrine of Amun at Karnak.

The structure, decoration, and complex history of the Chapel divulge secrets about the reign of Hatshepsut and the Egypt of the eighteenth dynasty.

== Construction of the shrine ==
Almost all of the New Kingdom rulers built at Karnak. Successive pharaohs added various structures in order to leave a lasting monument at the temple. Although Hatshepsut made many contributions to Karnak, one of her largest was the chapel. Hatshepsut began construction on the chapel in the seventeenth year of her reign. The chapel was placed within the Palace of Ma’at, the sanctuary constructed for Karnak by Hatshepsut honoring one of the oldest of deities. There is some debate, however, over whether or not the sanctuary had to be modified to accommodate the chapel. Because the space where the chapel was thought to stand once was occupied by a suite of three rooms that were built around the same time as the Chapel, Hatshepsut may have built the walls and then had them torn down immediately to make room for the introduction of the chapel.

It is probable that Hatshepsut did not complete the decoration of the chapel before her death because the upper blocks show only Thutmose III, her successor, and the upper registers of the southern outer wall bear a dedication inscription with his name alone. These signs imply that he had become the pharaoh by that time.

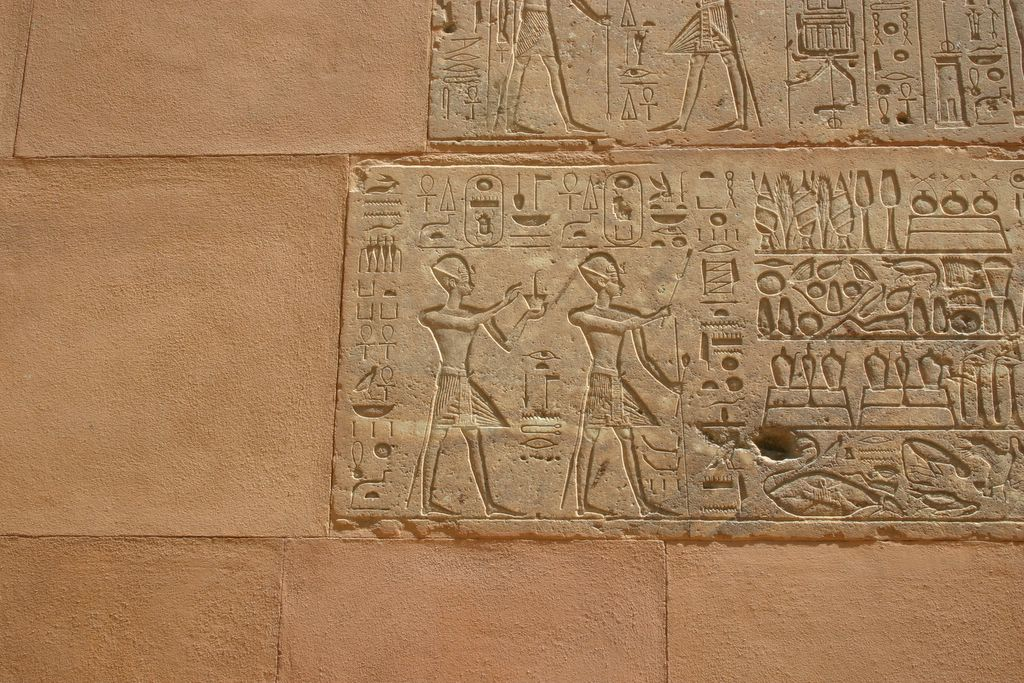
Detail of the Red Chapel showing Thutmose III following Hatshepsut and restoration work

== Decoration ==
Thutmose III had been the co-regent of Hatshepsut—the royal wife to his father and thereby his aunt and "stepmother"—who became pharaoh during his youth and ruled until her death. Thutmose III married the daughter of Hatshepsut, Neferure, to continue the royal lineage, but she and their offspring failed to survive his reign. During the majority of Thutmose's reign as pharaoh, none of the construction by Hatshepsut was harmed, and in fact, he continued to enhance this structure. The destruction of the works of Hatshepsut seems to have begun after his remaining son (of a non-royal wife) became co-regent to him in his old age. Some of these blocks were reused immediately in the shrine of Amun that was erected in the heart of Karnak temple.

Much of the chapel was covered in relief and inscriptions describing the events that occurred during the reign of Hatshepsut. Some of the relief on the shrine depicts priests carrying the barque of Amun through the temples and streets of Thebes during religious festivals. Some of the blocks show Hatshepsut in the royal garb, running with the Apis bull between the markers of her Heb-Sed festival.

The blocks of the building have been catalogued and numbered. Decorations on the Red Chapel may help archeologists pinpoint the coronation date of Hatshepsut: one text inscribed on Block 287, on the outside wall of the chapel, hints that Hatshepsut was named pharaoh in the second year of an unnamed king's reign. This text, narrated by Hatshepsut, describes a religious procession associated with the Opet Festival. During the ceremony, in the presence of this anonymous ruler, an oracle speaking the words of Amun makes the announcement that Hatshepsut is to become the pharaoh. It is unclear, however, who the unnamed king is. One argument is that it is Thutmose I, her father, and that the text represents Hatshepsut's recollection of a time during her father's reign when she was acknowledged as the true heir to the throne. If this interpretation is correct, when Hatshepsut was crowned remains uncertain. If the unnamed ruler is Thutmose III, however, the inscription might be a record of the date when Hatshepsut was declared pharaoh. Block 287 of the chapel does not go on to describe the coronation of Hatshepsut. He was a child when his father, Thutmose II, died and his mother was not his father's royal wife, Hatshepsut, but a secondary wife outside of the royal lineage. Hatshepsut and her royal daughter by Thutmose II already held important positions in the religious and political administrations of the country. Another block on the opposite outer wall of the chapel, far from block 287, however, contains a third person narrative revealing the details of the coronation. Based on the presumed position on the chapel of the third block, far from block 287, it is possible that her coronation occurred much later than the events on block 287. Today, archaeologists hope that finding one of the missing blocks of the Chapel will help solve this mystery.

Another scene shows a pharaoh offering incense before two pavilions, each of which holds a sacred barque and shrine. On each side of the three shrines pictured, stand two statues of Hatshepsut in the form of Osiris. Later in the scene, the pharaoh steers a boat toward Deir el-Bahri. One interpretation of this relief is that the king is the living Thutmose III, and that by steering a barque containing the sacred emblems of Hatshepsut toward the site of her mortuary temple, he is officiating her movement into the realm of becoming a deity. If this interpretation is correct, the relief probably was carved under the auspices of Thutmose III after the death of Hatshepsut. Other archaeologists, however, have hypothesized that the pharaoh driving the boat is Hatshepsut. This interpretation makes sense, as the inscription bears the words “The Good God, Lady of the Two Lands, Daughter of Re, Hatshepsut,” and the pharaoh is pictured making offerings to Amun. Because it seems that Hatshepsut is making the offerings before the Chapel, it can be presumed that there were two mummiform, Osirian statues of Hatshepsut at the entrance, one standing on either side of the shrine when it was built.

Some blocks from the Chapel are decorated with three sets of scenes in which an unnamed God’s Wife of Amun is shown performing her duties. Because of the time period at which the chapel was built, it is likely that this God's Wife is Neferure, the daughter of Hatshepsut and Thutmose II. These scenes make clear that as God's Wife she had an important role in the temple and had to be present at the rituals performed there. These are duties that the royal queen would have performed if her husband were pharaoh. Since Hatshepsut was pharaoh, it is thought that her daughter assumed the role for her mother. One block shows the God's Wife and a priest performing a ritualistic burning of the names of Egypt's enemies in an attempt to destroy them. Another depicts the God's Wife watching Hatshepsut present dinner to the seventeen deities of Karnak. Yet another shows the God's Wife, as chief priestess, leading a group of male priests to the temple pool to be purified and then following Hatshepsut into the shrine in which she performed sacred rites in front of the statue of Amun. Because of these carvings on the walls of the Red Chapel, archeologists have been given an insight to the active role the God's Wife of Amun played in religious practices.

One relief carved in the blocks on the exterior sides of the chapel tells the story of an expedition to Aswan. Men were sent out by Hatshepsut to collect stone from the quarry there to bring back to Karnak. Reliefs depict the cutting out, moving, and erecting of obelisks. Archeologists have learned how obelisks were transported in Egypt from these carvings. Two obelisks are shown tied to sledges and towed on a sycamore wood barge toward Thebes by a fleet of twenty-seven boats powered by eight hundred and fifty oarsmen. The larger of the obelisks commemorated Hatshepsut's Sed festival, which occurred at approximately the same time as the Chapel was built in the sixteenth year of her reign. Hatshepsut then is depicted presenting the obelisks as a dedication to Amun.

Because it is known that Hatshepsut built the obelisks of the Wadjet Hall, the Palace of Ma’at, and the Eighth Pylon, among others, it has been presumed that the scenes on the Chapel show the creation and erection of some of these monuments. In the text that accompanies the relief, Hatshepsut asserts that her divine father, Amun, came to her and told her to raise the obelisks in dedication to him.

Along with these reliefs, the exterior façade of the Chapel was decorated with the parallel scenes of receiving the crowns of Hatshepsut and of Thutmose III. Shown with the same pointed nose that was characteristic of depictions of Hatshepsut, Thutmose III also is pictured participating in the processions of the Beautiful Feast of the Valley and the Opet Festival.

On the interior, however, Hatshepsut is the only ruler depicted. Representations of Thutmose III sometimes are accompanied by feminine pronouns and he is shown twice walking alongside Hatshepsut's soul, her ka. Thutmose III's mortuary temple also is depicted on the wall of the Chapel, providing evidence that the mortuary temple was built as early as the period of his co-regency with Hatshepsut. The lower base of the chapel was decorated with knotted plant-forms and kneeling Nile deities and female figures.

== Destruction ==
After the pharaoh's death, Hatshepsut's Chapel was dismantled during the reign of Thutmose III. It originally was thought that the destruction of the chapel was part of the proscription of Hatshepsut that occurred beginning in year 42 of Thutmose III's reign. This was when he was an old man and during a co-regency with his son from a minor wife. That son would become Amenhotep II.

New research has shown evidence of additions to the top blocks of the shrine that show Thutmouse III without Hatshepsut and claiming the chapel as his own. This would imply that it was a completion of the chapel, that was unfinished after her death without any disturbance of the work completed by Hatshepsut.

Yet after his year 42—during his next co-regency with his son—Thutmose III's own building projects at Karnak such as the Hall of Annals deliberately conceal inscriptions and decoration relating to Hatshepsut and many decorations of Hatshepsut were erased. The blocks that have been found from the Chapel, however, show some random and incomplete erasures. Many of the blocks have no erasures on multiple sides. This phenomenon has caused some archeologists to believe that the attacks against the images of Hatshepsut occurred after the Red Chapel had been deconstructed and the blocks had been stacked so that they could be reused in other building projects.

Speculation exists that the workmen involved in the proscription did not take the time to examine every surface of the blocks when erasing, but just did away with all of the visible references to Hatshepsut on the surface they would display. Many surfaces would not have been visible in the new use, being interior to new walls. This led to the preservation of the original carvings that became interior parts of new walls. If this were true, it might mean that the Chapel was demolished before the proscription began, and that tearing it down was not part of Thutmose's attempt to persecute Hatshepsut's memory, but was justified as required for the practical purpose of making room for the larger barque shrine that he intended to put in the Red Chapel's place.

A similarly shaped granite barque shrine was constructed around year 46 of his reign during the co-regency with his son. It was covered with images of Amun that later were removed during the Amarna period by Akhenaten, another pharaoh who disdained the deity and the powerful priesthood that ran the country through the temple of Amun in Thebes. Except for the lack of need because of new placement that hid surfaces, the theory that the Chapel was not demolished maliciously also may be supported by the fact that Thutmose III and his son did not force the reliefs of Hatshepsut to be re-carved as were many of the other monuments.

The erasure of Hatshepsut reliefs from buildings usually occurred in three stages. The first was hacking the old image out with a chisel. Then, a fine implement was used to smooth the rough surface and remove the raised ridges. Finally, the wall was polished and carved anew. Because the sporadic cartouches and figures of Hatshepsut that were touched merely were removed and not replaced—aside from one cartouche on block 24 that was exchanged with the cartouche of Thutmose III’s nephew—it may be deduced that the erasures occurred after the shrine had been dismantled. As discussed at her article, his nephew is suspected of the greater destruction of the Hatshepsut works by some archeologists.

After it had been deconstructed, parts of the Red Chapel were used in the later building projects of other pharaohs at Karnak. The two black granite doorways of the chapel were placed in the main door to Thutmose III's north suite at the Palace of Ma’at and the door leading into the southern columned court in the Sixth Pylon. Amenhotep III also used some of the blocks from the Chapel in the construction of the Third Pylon, much later in the eighteenth dynasty.

The remaining blocks ended up being used in other monuments built at Karnak, for example in the foundation of the temple of Ptah, in the Ninth Pylon.

== Reconstruction ==
Many of the blocks from the disassembled Chapel were rediscovered in the 1950s inside the walls of other structures. A reconstruction model of how the chapel probably looked during Hatshepsut's reign was completed in 1997 by a group of French and Egyptian restoration experts.

Today, over 300 blocks from the chapel are displayed in their original context at the Open-Air Museum of Karnak.
