= Karnak Open Air Museum =

Egyptian archaeological museum

Coordinates: 25.7195°N 32.6574°E

Karnak Open Air Museum is an archaeological museum in Luxor, Egypt. It is located in the northwestern corner of the Precinct of Amon-Re at the Karnak complex.

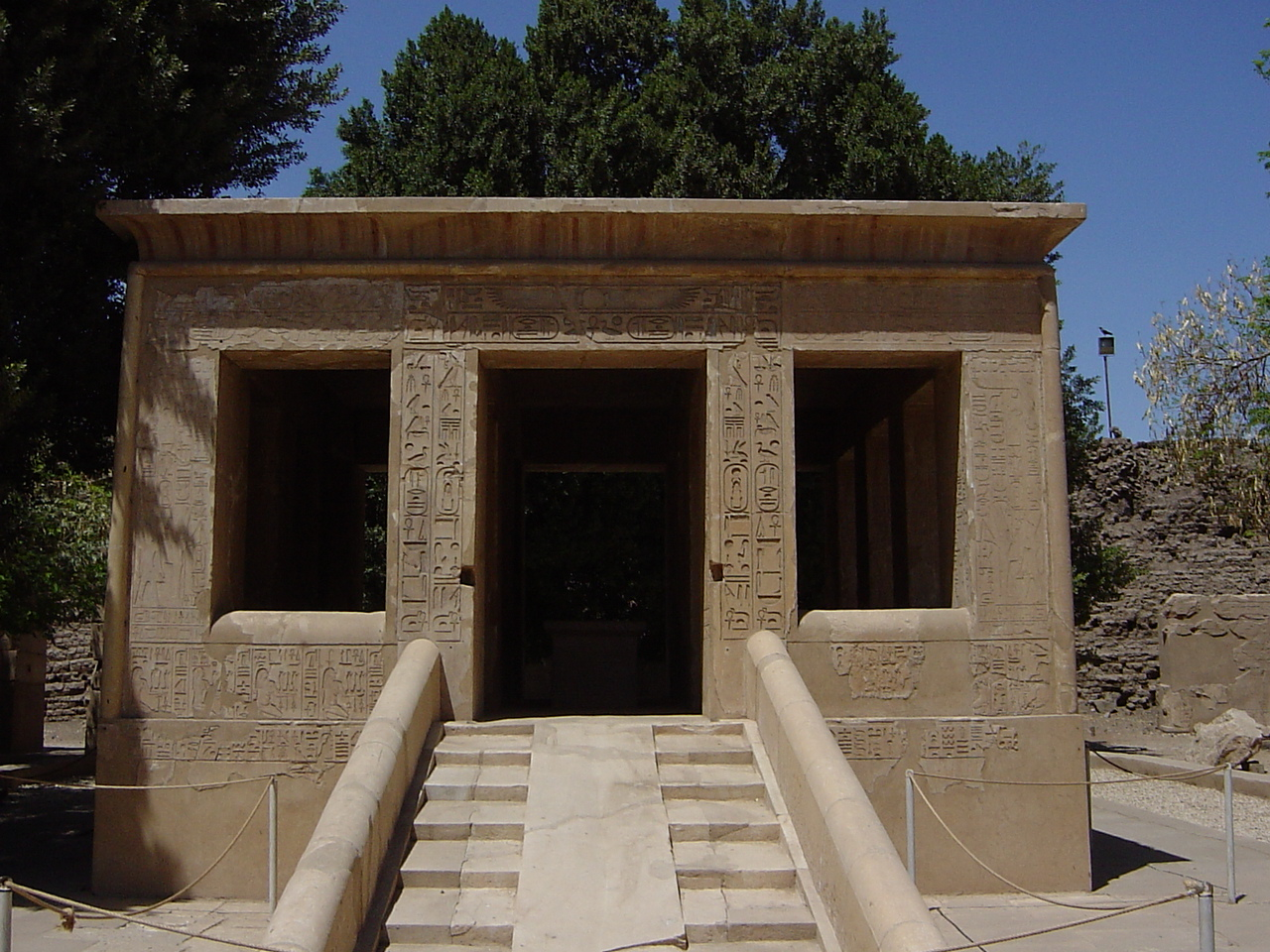
The White Chapel of Senusret I

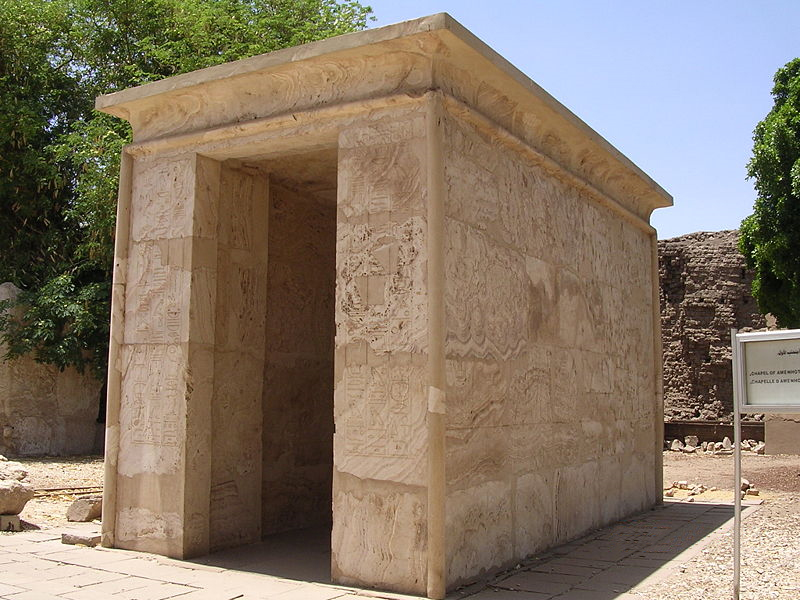
The Alabaster Chapel of Amenhotep I

The Red Chapel of Hatshepsut

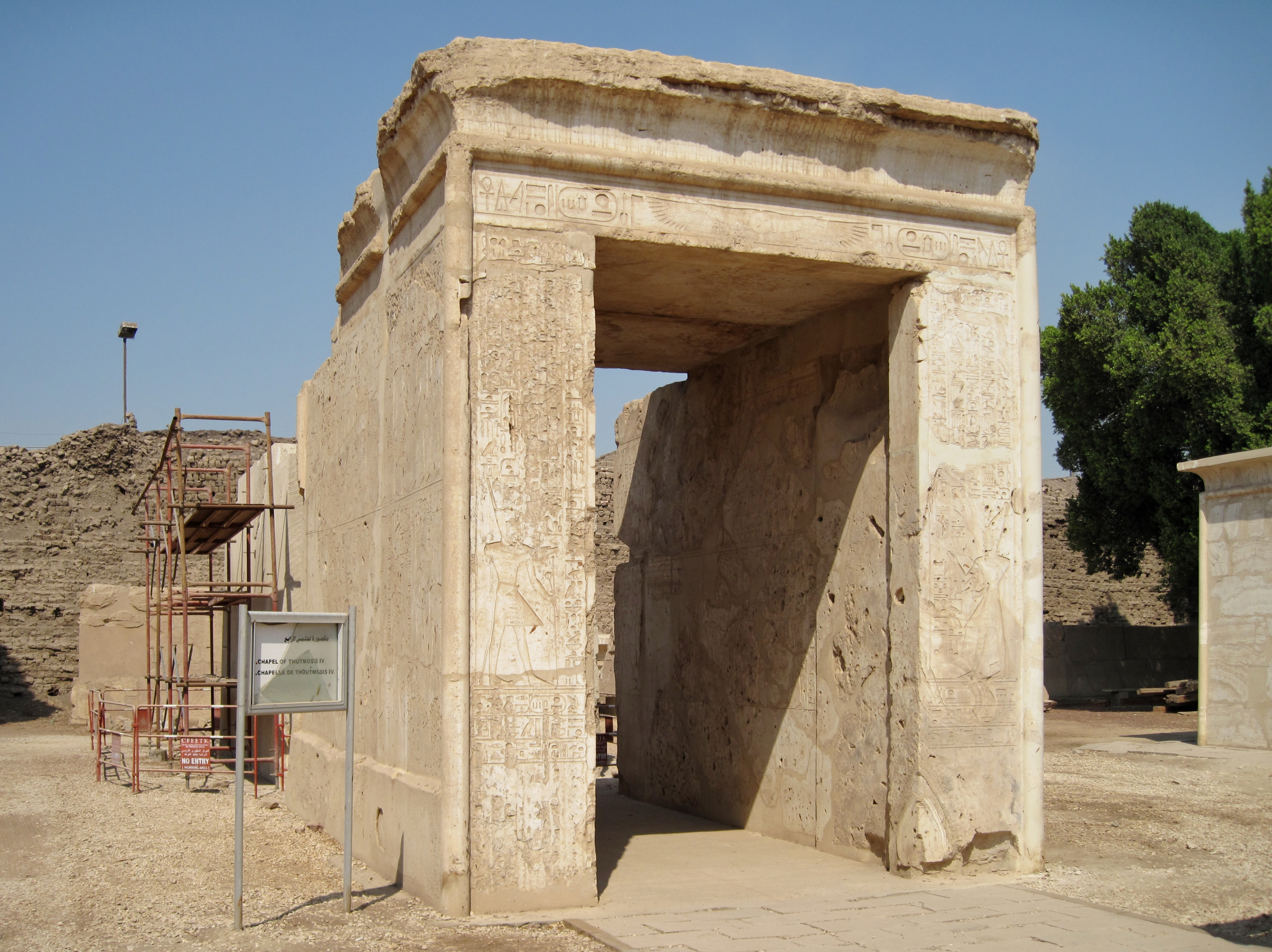
The Barque Chapel of Thutmosis IV

The Open Air Museum contains reconstructions of structures that have been dismantled and buried or hidden inside the massive pylons in the complex. As Karnak became more prominent, pharaohs sought to leave their mark on the temple complex with their own monuments. As successive rulers built their monuments, they dismantled the old ones and utilized the materials in their own designs.

Preventive archaeological excavations before the renovation of Amenhotep II's calcite shrine were observed in this area by the Centre Franco-Égyptien d'Étude des Temples de Karnak (CFEETK), including an urban unit with mudbricks walls of Saito-Persian time. Also discovered during CFEETK excavations were terracotta figures with female representation called "concubines;" such figures are commonly found in levels related to construction and may be votive objects which ensure the sustainability of construction.

== Notable shrines ==
A number of shrines have been rebuilt and among these edifices are the

1. Chapelle Rouge of Hatshepsut
2. The White Chapel of Senusret I
3. The calcite shrine of Amenhotep II
4. Barque shrine of King Tuthmosis III
5. Alabaster Chapel of Amenhotep I
6. Barque Chapel of Thutmosis IV
