= Great Hypostyle Hall =

Hall within the Karnak temple complex

Coordinates: 25.7186°N 32.6579°E

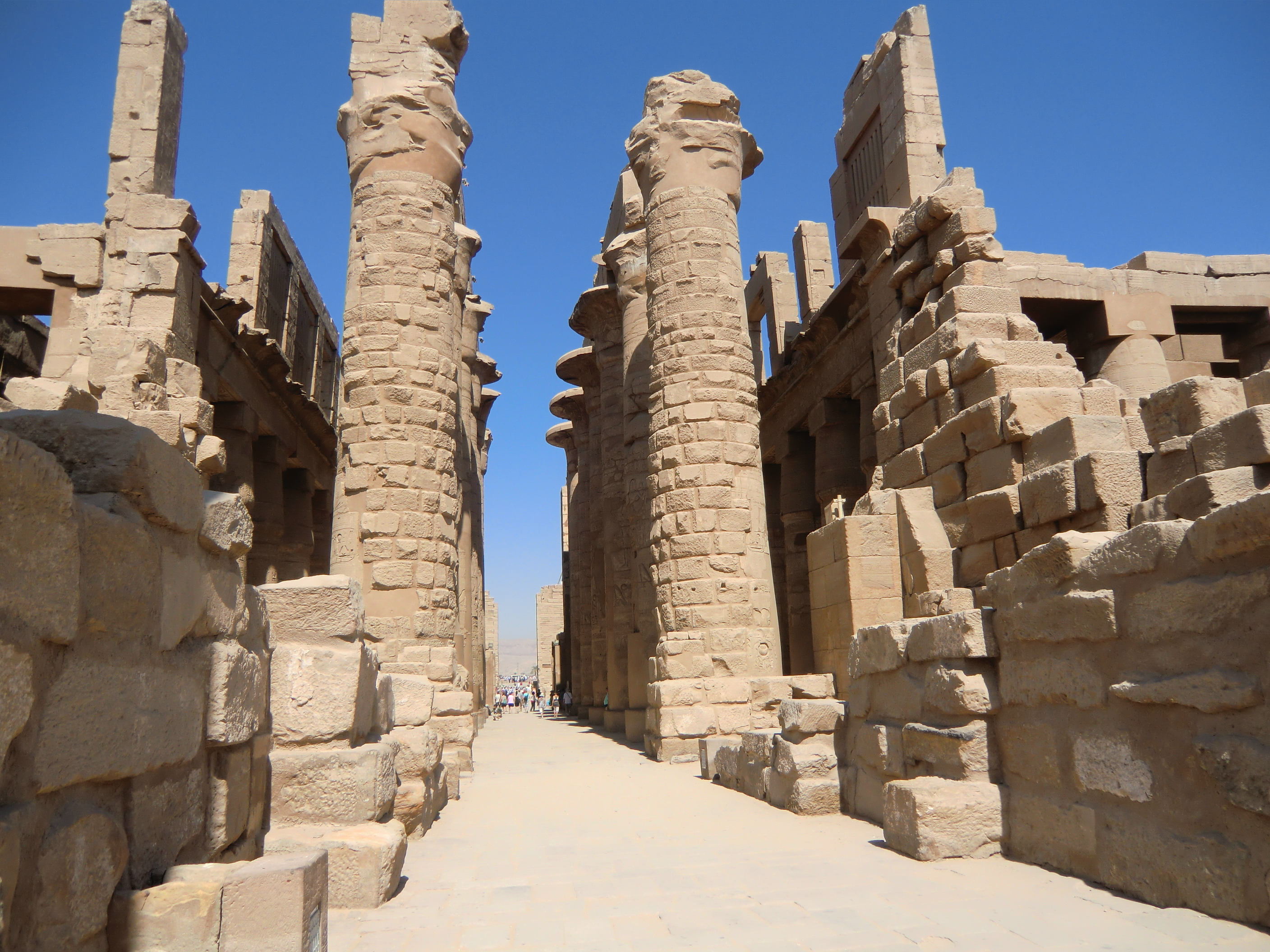
Entrance to the Great Hypostyle Hall

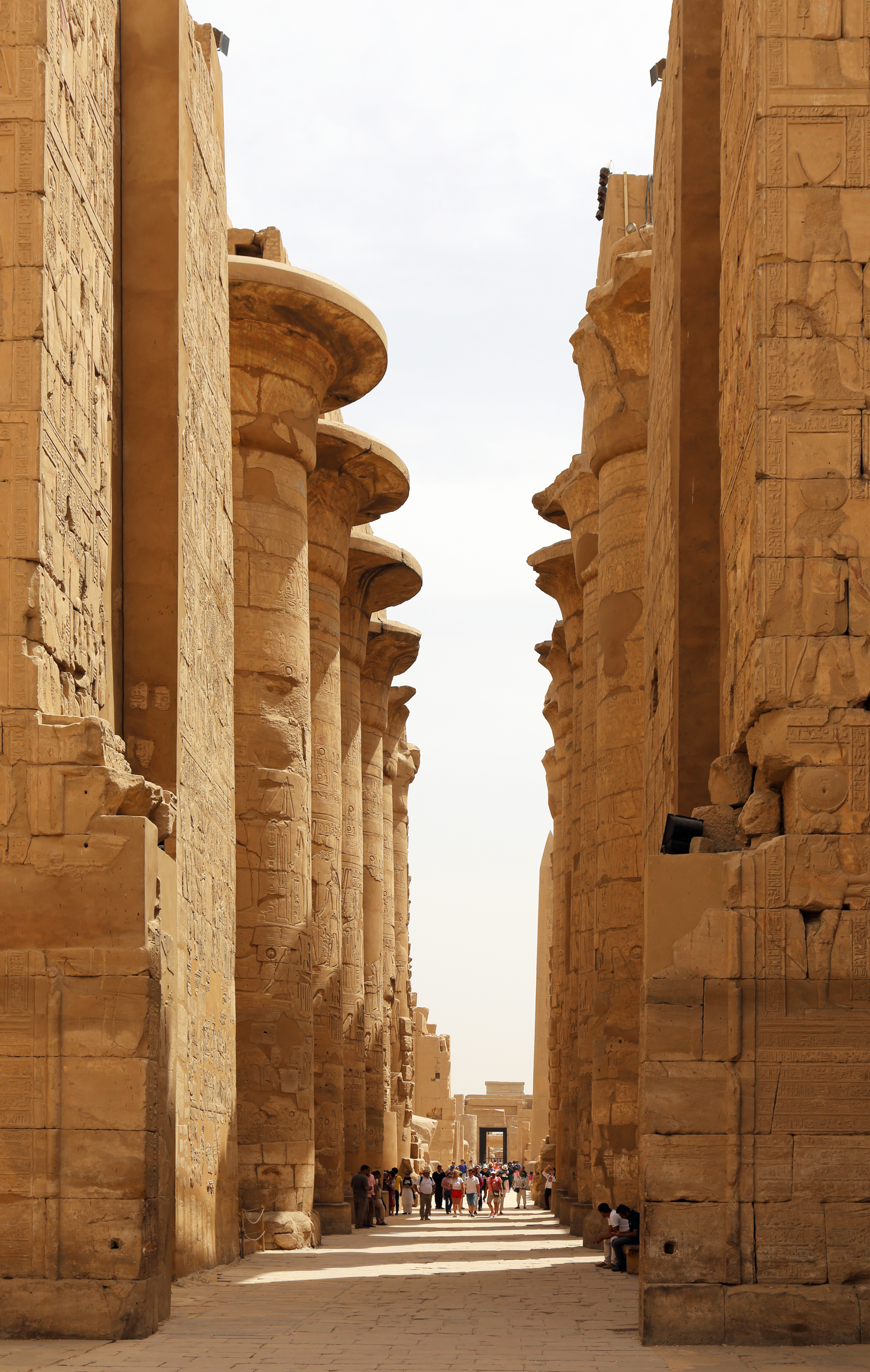
The Great Hypostyle Hall of Karnak

The Great Hypostyle Hall is located within the Karnak Temple Complex, in the Precinct of Amon-Re. It is one of the most visited monuments of Ancient Egypt. The structure was built around the 19th Egyptian Dynasty (c. 1290–1224 BCE). Its design was instituted by Hatshepsut, at the North-west chapel to Amun in the upper terrace of Deir el-Bahri. The name refers to hypostyle architectural pattern.

== Architecture and construction ==
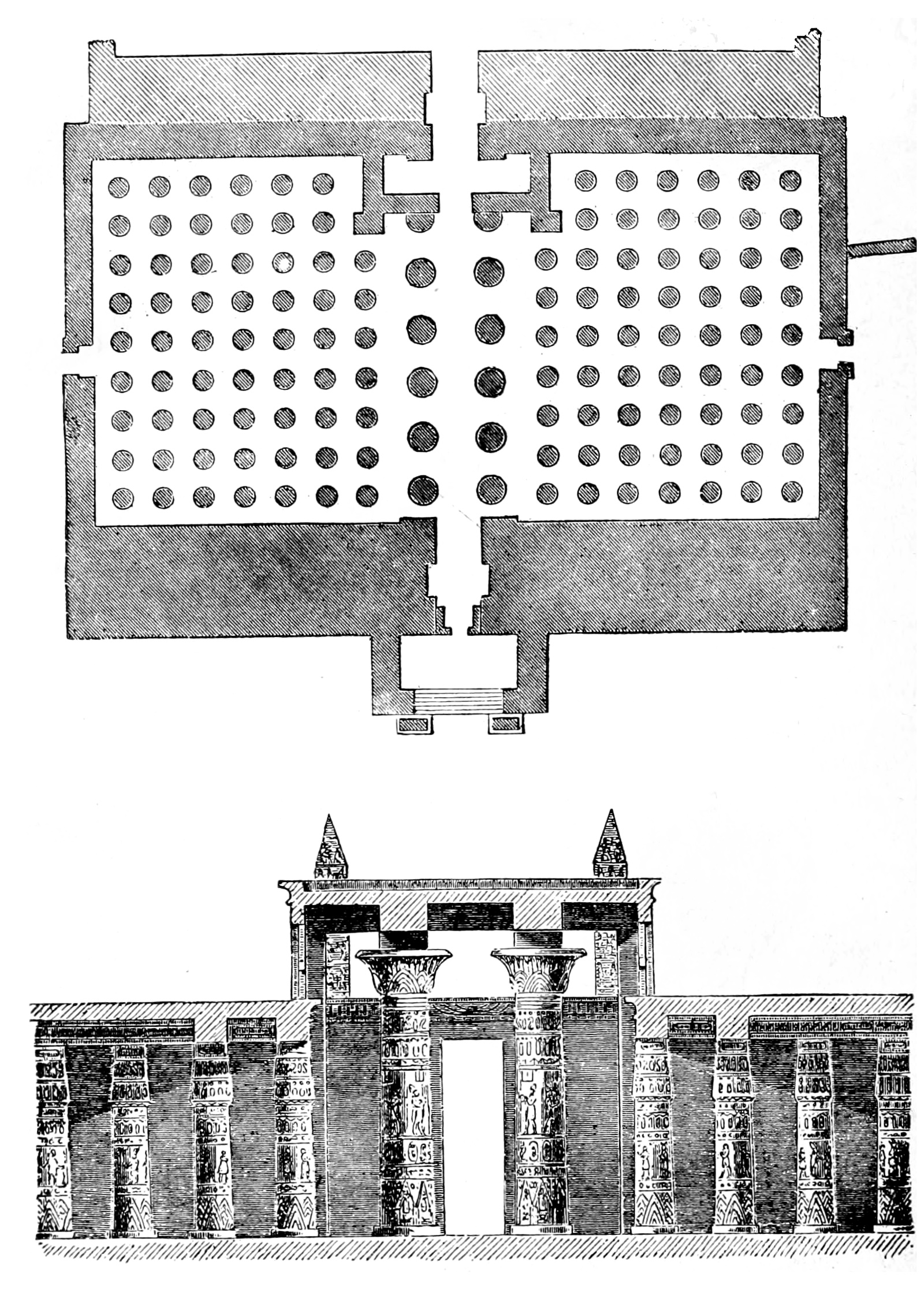
Outline of what the Hypostyle Hall looks like from an above view

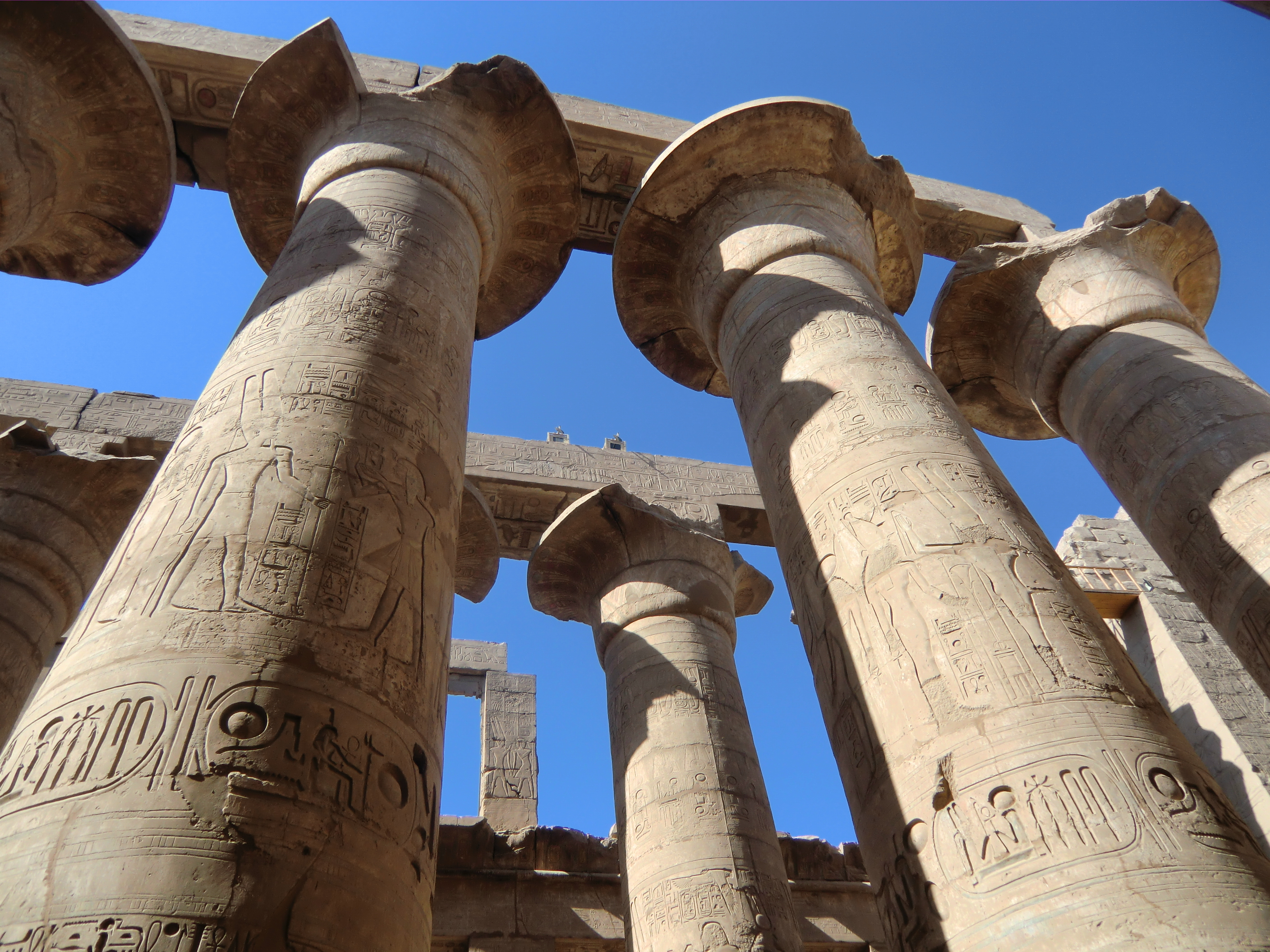
Central columns of the Hypostyle Hall

The Great Hypostyle Hall covers an area of 5,000 m^{2} (1.2 acres). The roof, now fallen, was supported by 134 columns in 16 rows: The outermost 6 rows has 9 columns, with the 7th second from the middle having only 7 columns. These 122 columns measure 14 metres (46 ft) with capitals resembling closed Cyperus papyrus floral buds. The two middlemost rows have 5 columns offset from the rest, with a sixth engaged with a back wall. These 12 are taller and wider than the others, being 10 metres (33 ft) in circumference and 24 metres (79 ft) high, with large, bell-shaped capitals resembling blooming papyrus flowers that supported a raised section of roof. Grilled windows of a clerestory allowed natural light in through this section. The 134 papyrus columns represent the primeval papyrus swamp from which Atum, a self-created deity, arose from the waters of Nun at the beginning of creation.

The hall was not constructed by Horemheb, or Amenhotep III as earlier scholars had thought but was built entirely by Seti I who engraved the northern wing of the hall with inscriptions. Decoration of the southern wing was completed by his son and successor to the throne Ramesses II.

The builders extend mudbrick ramps outward from the north and south sides of the Hall after filling up with the top of the first course of masonry. Although there are enough surviving remnants of these buildings embankments from the Hypostyle Hall, there are relics of another ramp that was used to build the first Pylon's south tower. Caissons in a mudbrick construction were filled with loose alluvial earth and desert sand. The Hall was probably constructed using whatever material was most readily available and convenient.

== Inscriptions and reliefs ==
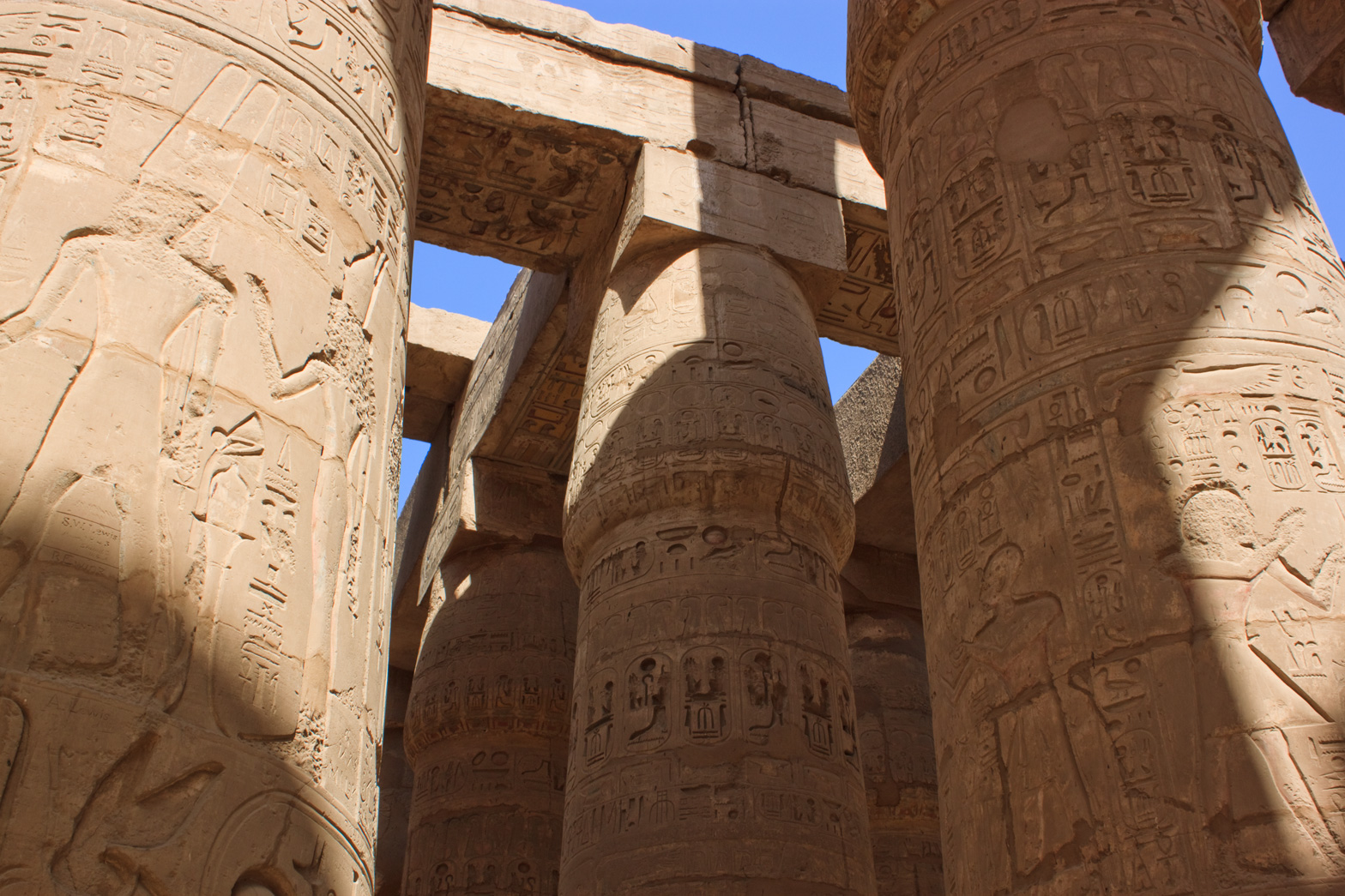
Inscriptions and reliefs

The walls and columns of the hall contain relief engravings depicting religious events, military conquests, and royal exploits. Over the centuries, numerous monarchs including Seti I, Ramesses II and Ramesses IV, added to the temple's carvings in places their predecessors had left blank. As such, the inscriptions and reliefs reflect the disparate eras in which they were produced through their variety in artistic styles and the differing royal names they contain. Successive pharaohs, Roman emperors, high priests, and common Egyptians added to the temple over the ages, altering its architecture, performing repairs, and leaving behind religious graffiti. These engravings together demonstrate the temple's lengthy history as a center of religious and political authority.

The outer walls of the temple depict scenes of battle, Seti I on the north and Ramesses II on the south. These reliefs had religious and ideological functions, they are seen as important records of the wars of these kings. On one wall adjoining the south wall of the Hall is a record of Ramesses II's Egyptian–Hittite peace treaty which he signed in the 21st year of his reign.

On the inside of the temple the engravings are executed as sunken relief rather than bas-relief, meaning they are carved into the walls and not raised. Most of these engravings also date from the reign of Seti I and Ramesses II, with the majority of the ornamental images showing religious ceremonies and the pharaohs' military triumphs. Although Seti I inscribed the abaci, architraves, and clerestory that topped the great columns, he never carved scenes on the rows and columns themselves.

All of the reliefs in the Hall's southern wing and the twelve large columns in the central nave were sculpted for Ramesses II. The columns show examples of each of the three stages of his relief decoration (R', R2, R3). Following his accession to the throne, the first areas to be adorned were the north–south axis and the central nave. These processional lanes were a priority, as evidenced by the reliefs on the south entryway having been carved at the beginning of his rule.

Succeeding monarchs like Pharaoh Ramesses IV (r. 1151–1145) and the High Priest of Amun Herihor (r. 1080–1072) decorated previously empty areas or even covered up old inscriptions on the columns. The Great Hypostyle Hall remained in operation for an additional seventeen centuries, up until the fourth century CE, when traditional Egyptian polytheism began to collapse.

== Collapse ==
In 1899, eleven of the massive columns of the Great Hypostyle Hall collapsed in a chain reaction, because their foundations were undermined by ground water. Georges Legrain, who was then the chief archaeologist in the area, supervised the rebuilding that was completed in May 1902. Later, similar work had to continue in order to strengthen the rest of the columns of the Temple.

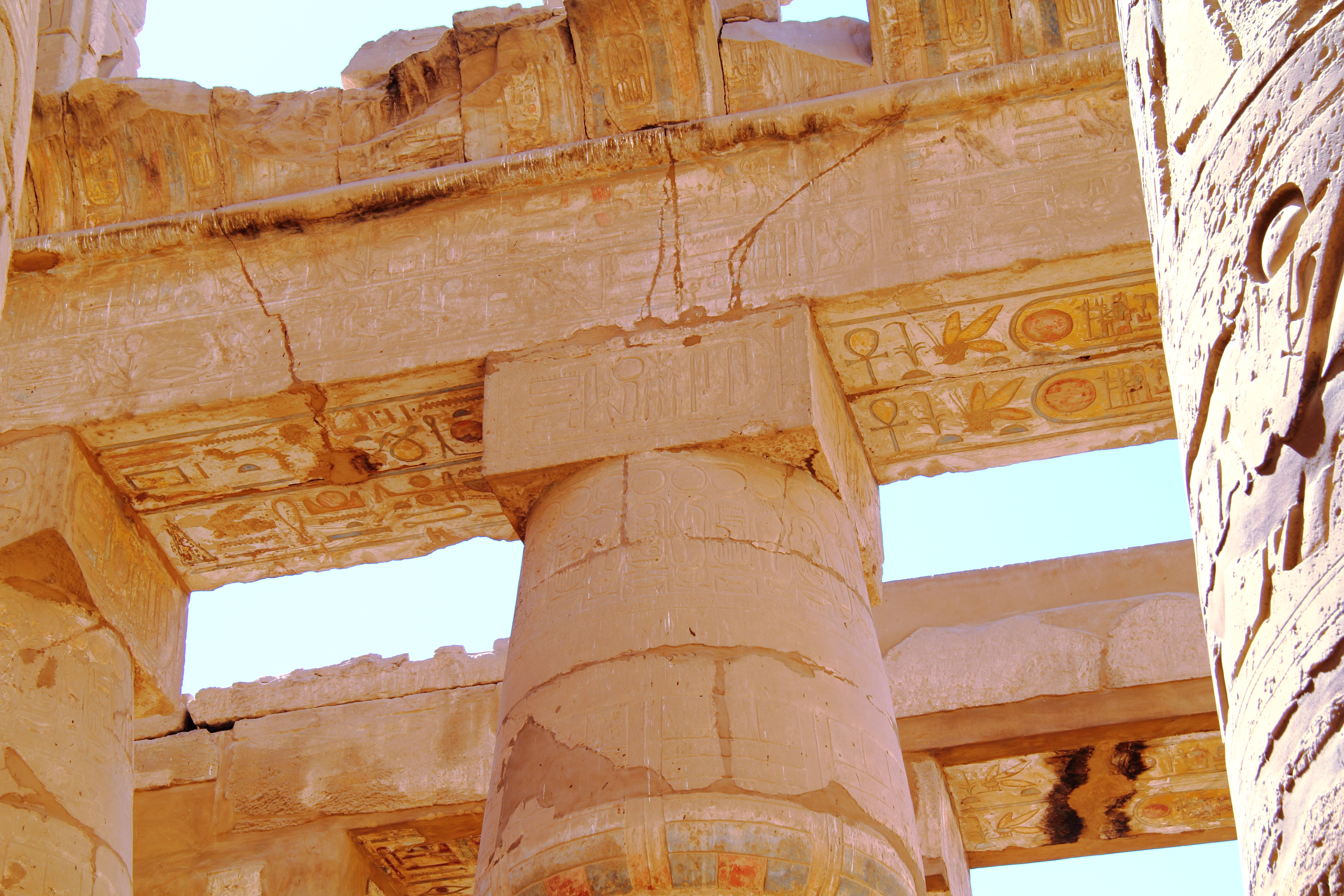
Inscriptions and reliefs were also put on the roof beams. These beams were placed on top of the column without support or anything connecting them to the columns, increasing their risk of falling.

== (R', R2, R3) ==
First Stage: Raised Relief, Early Prenomen (R').

Second Stage: Sunk Relief, Early Prenomen (R2).

Third Stage: Sunk Relief, Final Prenomen (R3).

== See also ==
- Talatat
