= Nathalie Beaux-Grimal =

French Egyptologist

Nathalie Beaux-Grimal (born 1960) is a French Egyptologist, a research associate at the Collège de France and the French Institute of Oriental Archaeology in Cairo (IFAO).

She was educated at Yale University and obtained a Ph.D. in Egyptology under Jean-Claude Goyon in Lumière University Lyon 2 with a thesis on the Botanical Garden of the Precinct of Amun-Re at Karnak (1989). From 1997 to 2005, she was French coordinator of Egyptology in the Faculty of Archeology at Cairo University in Giza. As part of the excavations of the IFAO, she participated in an expedition to the site of Deir el-Bahari, in collaboration with Janusz Karkowski of the Polish Centre of Mediterranean Archaeology of the University of Warsaw (PCMA UW). She is considered an expert on Thutmose III.

== Publications ==
- « Étoile et étoile de mer : Une tentative d’identification du signe N14 », RdE 39, 1988, p. 197–204.
- « The representation of Polygonum senegalense Meisn. in ancient Egyptian reliefs and paintings », JEA 74, 1988, p. 248–52.
- « Pour une paléographie du Papyrus Chester Beatty 2018 », Cahiers de la Bibliothèque copte 4, 1989, p. 46–49.
- Le cabinet de curiosités de Thoutmosis III – Plantes et animaux du Jardin botanique de Karnak, Orientalia Lovaniensia Analecta 36, Louvain, 1990, 349 p., 67 pl. Prix Bordin de l’Académie des Inscriptions et Belles-Lettres, 1991.
- « Cultures et supports en Égypte ancienne – Remarques iconographiques et paléographiques autour du signe M43 », Langues Orientales Anciennes Philologie et Linguistique 3, 1991, p. 205–214.
- « Ennemis étrangers et malfaiteurs égyptiens : la signification du châtiment au pilori », BIFAO 91, 1992, p. 33–53.
- « Remarks on the reptile signs depicted in the White Chapel of Sesostris I at Karnak », écrit en collaboration avec S.M. Goodman, Cahiers de Karnak 9, 1992, p. 125–134.
- « Sirius, étoile et jeune Horus », Hommages à Jean Leclant, BdE 106/1, 1994, p. 61–72.
- « La douat dans les Textes des Pyramides », BIFAO 94, 1994, p. 1–6.
- « La chapelle d’Hathor de Thoutmosis III à Deir-el-Bahari », Hommages A. A. Sadek, Varia Aegyptiaca 10/2–3, 1995, p. 59–66.
- « Le mastaba de Ti à Saqqara – Architecture de la tombe et orientation des personnages figurés », Études sur l’Ancien Empire et la nécropole de Saqqâra dédiées à Jean-Philippe Lauer, Orientalia Monspeliensia IX, 1997, p. 89–98.
- « Associations divines et réalité astronomique. La représentation de Spdt », Hommages Faiza Haikal, BdE 138, 2003, p. 51–62.
- « La marque du divin – Comparaison entre deux corpus funéraires : les textes des pyramides et les textes des sarcophages », D’un monde à l’autre. Textes des Pyramides et Textes des Sarcophages, BdE 139, 2004, p. 43–56.
- « La pintade, le soleil et l’éternité – À propos du signe G 21 », BIFAO 104, 2004, p. 21–38.
- « Le message muet de l’image dans l’écriture hiéroglyphique égyptienne », Actes du forum international d’inscriptions, de calligraphies et d’écritures dans le monde à travers les âges, Bibliotheca Alexandrina, 2007, p. 67–78.
