= Temple of Amenhotep IV =

Ancient Egyptian temple

Coordinates: 25.7182°N 32.6582°E

Layout plan of the Gem-pa-Aten, constructed by Amenhotep IV

The Temple of Amenhotep IV was an ancient monument at Karnak in Luxor, Egypt. The structures were used during the New Kingdom, in the first four years of the 18th Dynasty reign of the Egyptian Pharaoh Akhenaten, when he still used the name Amenhotep IV. The edifices may have been constructed at the end of the reign of his father, Amenhotep III, and completed by Akhenaten.

== Location and layout ==
The temple was constructed outside the boundaries of the Precinct of Amon-Re, to its east. The main temple in the complex was named Gm–p3–itn (Gem-pa-Aten), which means "The Sun Disc is Found in the Estate of the God Aten". The other monuments were named Hwt–bnbn (Hwt benben / "The Mansion of the Benben stone"), Rwd–mnw–n–itn–r–nḥḥ (Rud-menu / "Sturdy are the Monuments of the Sun Disc Forever"), and Tni–mnw–n–itn–r–nḥḥ (Teni–menu / "Exalted are the Monuments of the Sun Disc Forever").

Very little of these buildings remain; they were built quickly, using Talatat blocks, and could therefore easily be demolished and reused as core for later structures.

=== Gempaaten ===
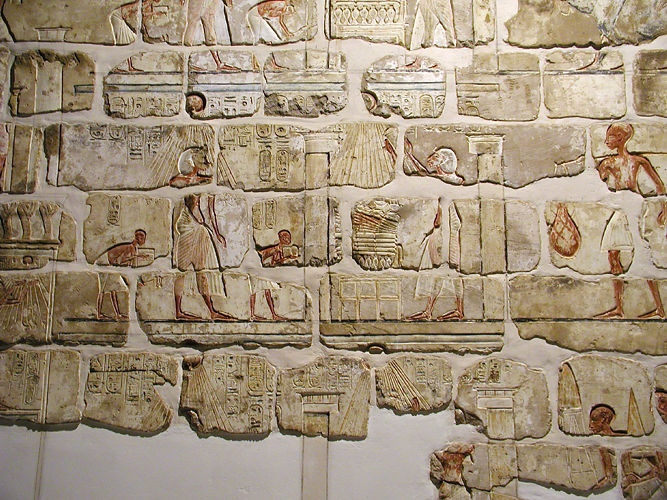
Reassembled Talatats from the Gem-pa-Aten

The Gem-pa-Aten appears to have had no roof and its offering tables were exposed to direct sunlight. In this building (or associated with it) were red granite and sandstone statues of Akhenaten, red granite offering tables and other statues, including a sphinx inscribed with the name of the deity Aten. It was of a considerable size (130 m × 216 m (427 ft × 709 ft)), but it was so completely destroyed that even its foundations have been nearly obliterated.

It stood within a mud-brick enclosure, and was oriented to the east, possibly with an entrance to the west. It led to an open court surrounded by square pillars and colossal statues of Akhenaten and Nefertiti.

=== Hwt benben ===
Erected to the east, the Hwt benben or Mansion of the Benben was devoted to a solar cult and was closely associated with the Gempaaten.

=== Teni-menu ===
The Teni–menu seemed to contain domestic and storage rooms, and may have been a royal residence, although not enough of the structure remains to clarify the use.

The walls of the Teni-menu were reused in the Ninth Pylon of the main Karnak temple. They have since been identified and reassembled like a giant puzzle and are partly exhibited in the Luxor Museum. The reassembled walls show residential, administrative and royal scenes and solar Jubilee scenes of the first Sed festival, which Akhenaten was probably celebrating at the same time as his father Amenhotep III.

== See also ==
- List of ancient Egyptian sites, including sites of temples

== Notes and references ==
=== Further reading ===
- Blyth, Elizabeth (2006). Karnak: Evolution of a Temple. Oxford: Routledge. ISBN 0-415-40487-8.
- Donald Redford, Akhenaten : The Heretic King, Princeton, 1984
