= Colossal Statues of Akhenaten at East Karnak =

Statues of the Egyptian 18th-Dynasty pharaoh discovered in Karnak, Thebes

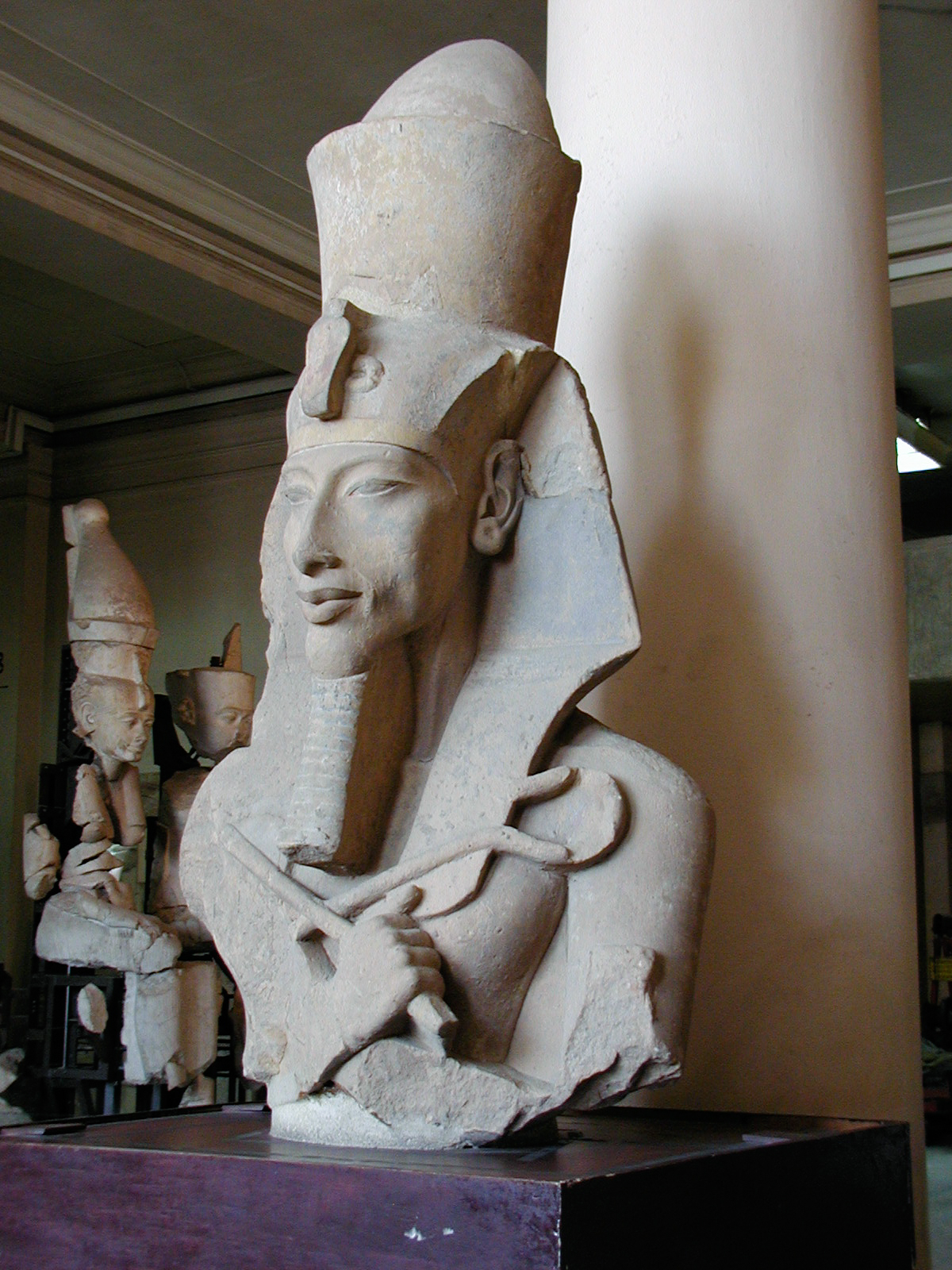
One of the statues

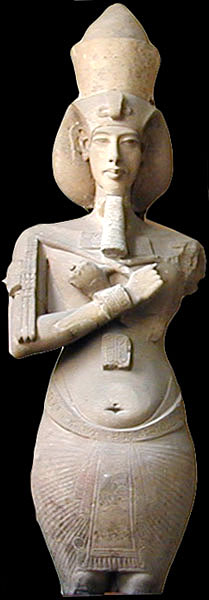
A statue

The Colossal Statues of Akhenaten at East Karnak depict the 18th Dynasty pharaoh, Akhenaten (also known as Amenophis IV or Amenhotep IV), in a distorted representation of the human form. The statues are believed to be from early in his reign, which lasted arguably from either 1353 to 1336 BCE or 1351 to 1334 BCE. The excavation, begun by Henri Chevrier in 1925, uncovered twenty-five fragments of the broken colossi in Eastern Karnak in Thebes, which are now located in the Egyptian Museum in Cairo, Egypt.

== Description ==
The statues were divided into three categories based on size, the largest of which were 12.75 metres (41.83 feet) tall and the smallest, 8.55 metres (28.05 feet). The pharaoh is depicted with a distorted physique not present elsewhere in the artwork of ancient Egypt. He is portrayed with a protruding stomach, thin arms, and exaggerated facial features, such as a long nose, hanging chin and thick lips. One statue in particular has been the subject of much debate as it represents the king apparently nude and lacking genitals. There are various theories about the destruction of the statues, one of which suggests that his elder coregent, Amenhotep III, had the statues dismantled and covered up. A second theory suggests that Akhenaten himself had the statues torn down with a change of planning in the construction of the Aten temple.

== Discovery ==
The colossi of Akhenaten were discovered accidentally in 1925 while a drainage ditch was being dug east of the enclosure wall of the Great Temple of Amun. The sandstone statues were inscribed with the name Amenhotep IV, and were found fallen prostrate on the ground. Henri Chevrier, the chief inspector of antiquities at Karnak, became interested in the site and spent the next twenty-five years periodically excavating the site in hopes of uncovering more. Chevrier discovered the foundations of a wall angled southwest and twenty-eight stone bases, which he assumed were the pedestals of the fallen statues.

== Significance to Egyptian art ==
Traditionally, pharaohs are depicted idealistically in Egyptian art – heroic and robust. The departure from cultural norms that occur with the colossi of Akhenaten, therefore, has sparked numerous debates among scholars. It is very unlikely that an artist would have voluntarily produced such an image of the king in such a different style without it being commissioned by the pharaoh himself. Some scholars characterize the style of art during the reign of Akhenaten as ‘expressionistic’ and find a relation between representations such as the colossi and the religious revolution of the time, which were supported by Akhenaten. Although the pharaoh, and in some instances, other members of the Royal Family, are depicted in unorthodox ways, he did not alter standard practices of Egyptian art outside of depictions of the human body and depicted non-royals in the classical style.

== Conflicting theories ==
The mystery behind the colossal statues of Akhenaten at East Karnak has led to numerous interpretations of the material. One theory regarding the purpose of the statues suggests that the pharaoh wished to separate himself from ordinary people and associate him solely with divinity and the Royal Family.

Another theory suggests that Akhenaten was depicted in his true form, claiming that he suffered from a disease that caused the disfigurations. Several pathologists have studied the abnormalities of the statues’ physical attributes. One resulting diagnosis is that Akhenaten suffered from a disorder of the endocrine system called Froehlich's syndrome. However, this theory has been debunked due to the facts that most who suffer from this disease are intellectually disabled and unable to sire children, both of which are side effects Akhenaten did not appear to have. Another related theory is that Akhenaten may have suffered from a rare genetic disorder known as Marfan's syndrome. This hypothesis will rely on the results of DNA testing of the KV 55 tomb, in which it is theorized lies Akhenaten's mummy. Until then, however, it remains inconclusive.

Numerous theories exist about one particular statue in the collection, which represents the king naked without genitalia. One such theory concludes that these physical oddities symbolize the manifestations of the bisexual nature of the sun-god who impregnated himself to create the universe. In contrast, historian K.R. Harris explains that at least some of the colossi, this one in particular, represents not Akhenaten, but Nefertiti wearing a close-clinging garment, which is undetectable because the feet of the statue are missing. Other queens in Egyptian history have been depicted with masculine features, such as Hatshepsut, therefore this argument may not be far off. Harris alternatively suggests that the colossi statues may be the personifications of deities, such as Aten, Shu, or Atum.

Lastly, a related debate surrounds the actual site where the statues were discovered. Some scholars maintain that the statues and colonnades discovered were the remains of a temple built by the pharaoh. References exist that support this theory (i.e. in the tomb of the vizier Ramose at Western Thebes). Others argue that the site consists of the ruins of a palace Akhenaten built. The Akhenaten Temple Project in 1975, however, concluded that the remains were indeed that of the Atem Temple.

== See also ==
- Temple of Amenhotep IV
