= Botanical garden of Thutmosis III =

Ancient Egyptian temple structure built 1479 – 1425 BC

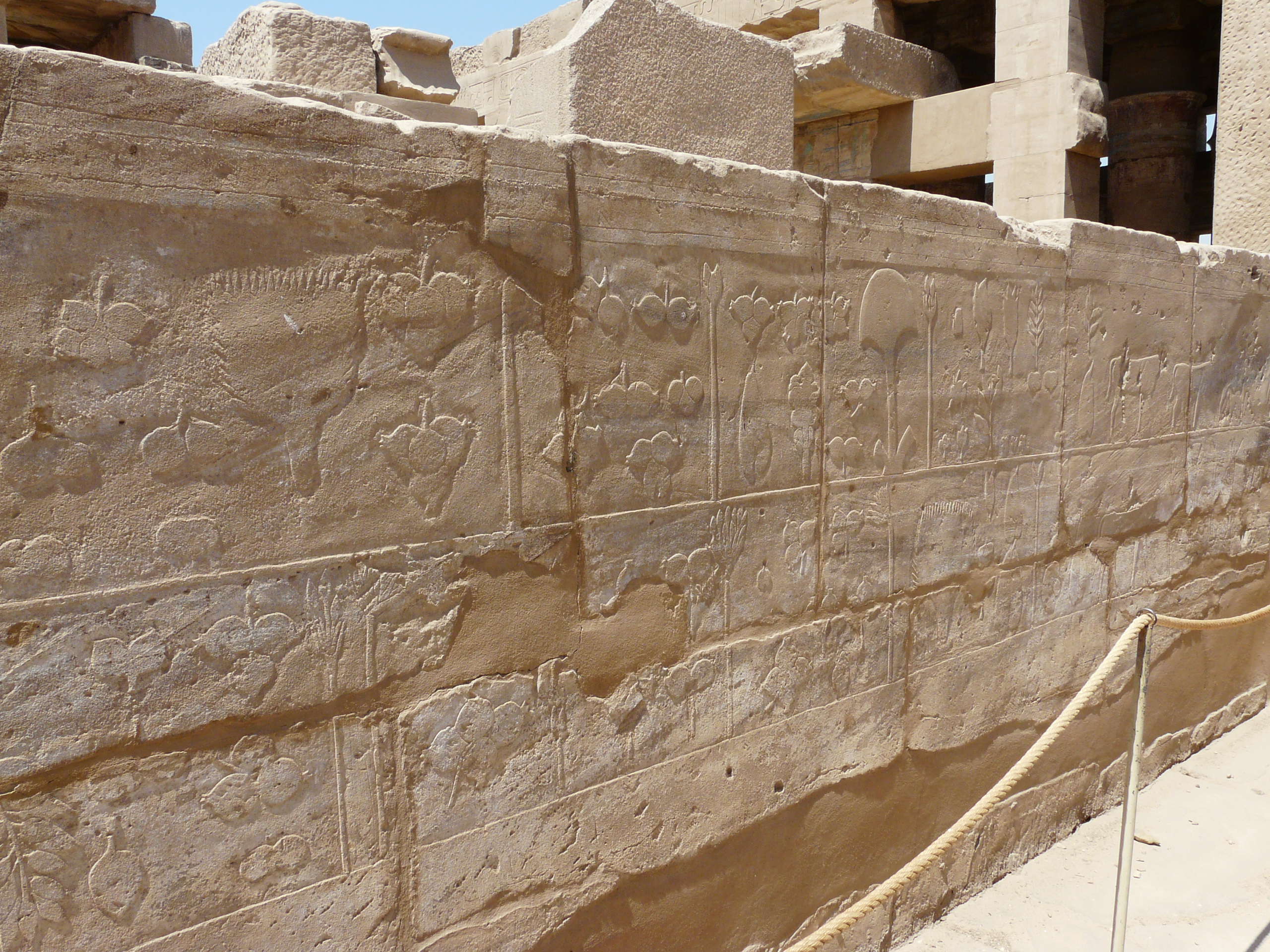
Engravings of plants and animals on the walls of the "botanical garden".

The Botanical Garden of Thutmosis III (French: Jardin botanique de Thoutmôsis III) is an Ancient Egyptian structure which is decorated with intricate engravings of plants and animals from all over the ancient Near East. It features depictions of 275 different types of plants, prompting early French Egyptologists to call it a "botanical garden". The Botanical Garden was built in the New Kingdom period during the reign of Thutmosis III (r. 1479 – 1425 BC). It is part of the Precinct of Amun-Re in the vast Karnak Temple Complex at Luxor.

Thutmosis III was interested in the native flora and fauna of his newly-acquired territories as he expanded Egypt's borders through conquest. He is traditionally said to have introducd the iris, among other plants, to Egypt.

The structure consisted of three rooms and two antechambers that lead to the largest sanctuary of the complex. This large sanctuary is considered the Botanical Garden proper. The "botanical garden" consists of two rows: the upper row contains the engraved plants, and the lower row contains the engraved animals.

== Bibliography ==
- Auguste Mariette, Karnak : étude topographique et archéologique, Musée de Boulaq, 1875, plates 28-31.
- Nathalie Beaux, Le cabinet de curiosités de Thoutmosis III : plantes et animaux du « Jardin botanique » de Karnak, Leuven, Peeters, coll. « Orientalia Lovaniensia Analecta » (no 36), 1990 (ISBN 9068312685)
- Laboury, D. (2007). Archaeological and Textual Evidence for the Function of the'Botanical Garden'of Karnak in the Initiation Ritual. In Sacred Spaces and Sacred Function in Ancient Thebes. Occasional Proceedings of the Theban Workshop (pp. 27-34). University of Chicago Press.
- Robins, G.(2008). The art of Ancient Egypt. Cairo: The American University in Cairo Press.
