= Georges Legrain =

French egyptologist

Georges Albert Legrain
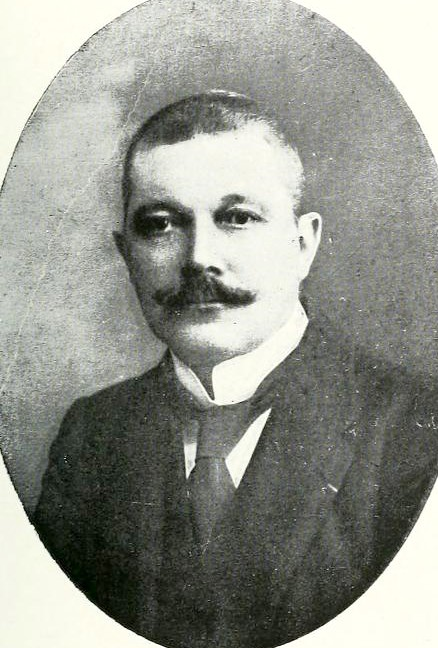
- Born: 4 October 1865
- Died: 22 August 1917 (aged 51)
- Occupation: Egyptologist
- Years active: 1887-1917
- Known for: Karnak Cachette

Georges Albert Legrain (4 October 1865, in Paris – 22 August 1917, in Luxor) was a French Egyptologist.

== Life and work ==
From 1883 to 1890, Legrain was a student at the École des Beaux-Arts in Paris. He also studied Egyptology at that time, attending lectures by famous scholars like Gaston Maspero at the Sorbonne. Legrain's first academic article, on the analysis of a Demotic papyrus, appeared in 1887.

In 1898, he married Jeanne-Hélène Ducros, with whom he had 2 children.

In 1892, he was offered the opportunity to go to Cairo as a member of the local Institut Français d'Archéologie Orientale (IFAO) under Urbain Bouriant to work as archaeological draftsman and illustrator.

Jacques de Morgan, the new head of the Service of Antiquities, was preparing his Catalogue des Monuments et Inscriptions de l’Egypte. Legrain worked on the first volume, dealing with the graffiti in the area of Aswan, where he also took part in the excavations.

He spent many years with his research in the Temple of Karnak. From 1895, he was the overseer of the antiquities there, and in charge of the restoration of the huge temple complex of Karnak in Luxor.

In 1899, 11 of the massive columns of the Great Hypostyle Hall at Karnak collapsed in a chain reaction. Legrain was put in charge of the rebuilding of this part of the Temple, where the workers constructed new solid foundations for the columns. On 15 of May 1902 he recorded in the "Annales" the completion of this part of the work.

Later, similar work was done to strengthen the rest of the columns of the Temple.

== Karnak Cachette ==
In 1903, at the Temple, Legrain discovered a cache of nearly 800 stone statues and 17,000 bronzes, as well as other artifacts. They were buried in the north-west section of the courtyard of the Temple of Amun, in front of the Seventh Pylon. This is now known as the Cachette Court of the Precinct of Amun-Re—which is one of the four main temple enclosures that make up the Karnak Temple Complex.

Among those 800 stone statues, there were more than 350 block statues.

This was the largest Egyptian statue hoard ever recorded. It is generally believed that the hoard was ritually buried by temple priests in the Ptolemaic period to relieve the crowding of private offerings given over the centuries.

Unearthing all the objects was made difficult by the high water table, and the excavation lasted until 1907. Most of the statues ended up in the Cairo Museum, but also at other museums around the world.

The objects date mostly from the New Kingdom up to the end of the Ptolemaic period. Some objects from the Old and Middle Kingdoms were also found. From the Old Kingdom, the lower part of a striding statue of the 5th Dynasty King Niuserre was found. There are more finds from the Middle Kingdom, such as the royal statues of Senusret I, Senusret III and Amenemhet III.

A database project on the Karnak Cachette was launched in 2006 as a joint project of the Institut Français d'Archéologie Orientale (IFAO) and the Supreme Council of Antiquities (SCA) of Egypt.

In January 2012, Version 2 of the Karnak Cachette Database was made available online. It gives access to around 8000 photos documenting the statues kept in the Egyptian Museum in Cairo.

== His last years ==
He continued his work in Egypt even after the beginning of World War I. The diifficult work and the pressures of dealing with the bureaucracy led to illness and his sudden death in 1917. His excavation diaries, as well as his master list of the Karnak Cachette objects are now lost. Only the published reports remain. More than 1,200 photos of his excavations and reconstructions survive.

== Publications ==
- Jacques de Morgan; Urbain Bouriant; Georges Legrain; Gustave Jéquier; A. Barsanti, Catalogue monuments et inscriptions de l'Egypte antique, 3 volumes (De la frontière de Nubie à Kom Ombos, Kom Ombos), Wien : Wood-live, to 1894-1909.
- Morgan, Jacques de; Legrain, Georges, Fouilles à Dahchour, 2 volumes, Wien : Wood-live, 1895, 1903.
- Legrain, Georges, L'aile nord du pylône d'Aménophis III à Karnak, Paris : Leroux, 1902.
- Legrain, Georges, Statues et statuettes de rois et de particuliers, 3 volumes, Le Caire : Imprimerie de l'Inst. Français d'Archéologie Orientale, 1906-1925, (Catalogue général des antiquités égyptiennes Musée de Caire).
- Friedrich Preisigke, Ägyptische und griechische Inschriften und Graffiti aus den Steinbrüchen des Gebel Silsile (Oberägypten) : nach den Zeichnungen von Georges Legrain (Egyptian and Greek inscriptions and graffiti from the quarries of the Gebel Silsile (Upper Egypt) : after the designs of Georges Legrain), Strassburg : Truebner, 1915.
- Legrain, Georges, Les Temples de Karnak, Bruxelles : Vromant, 1929.
- Legrain, Georges, Une Famille copte de Haute-Egypte, Brussels, 1945.
