= Hypostyle =

Hall with a roof supported by columns

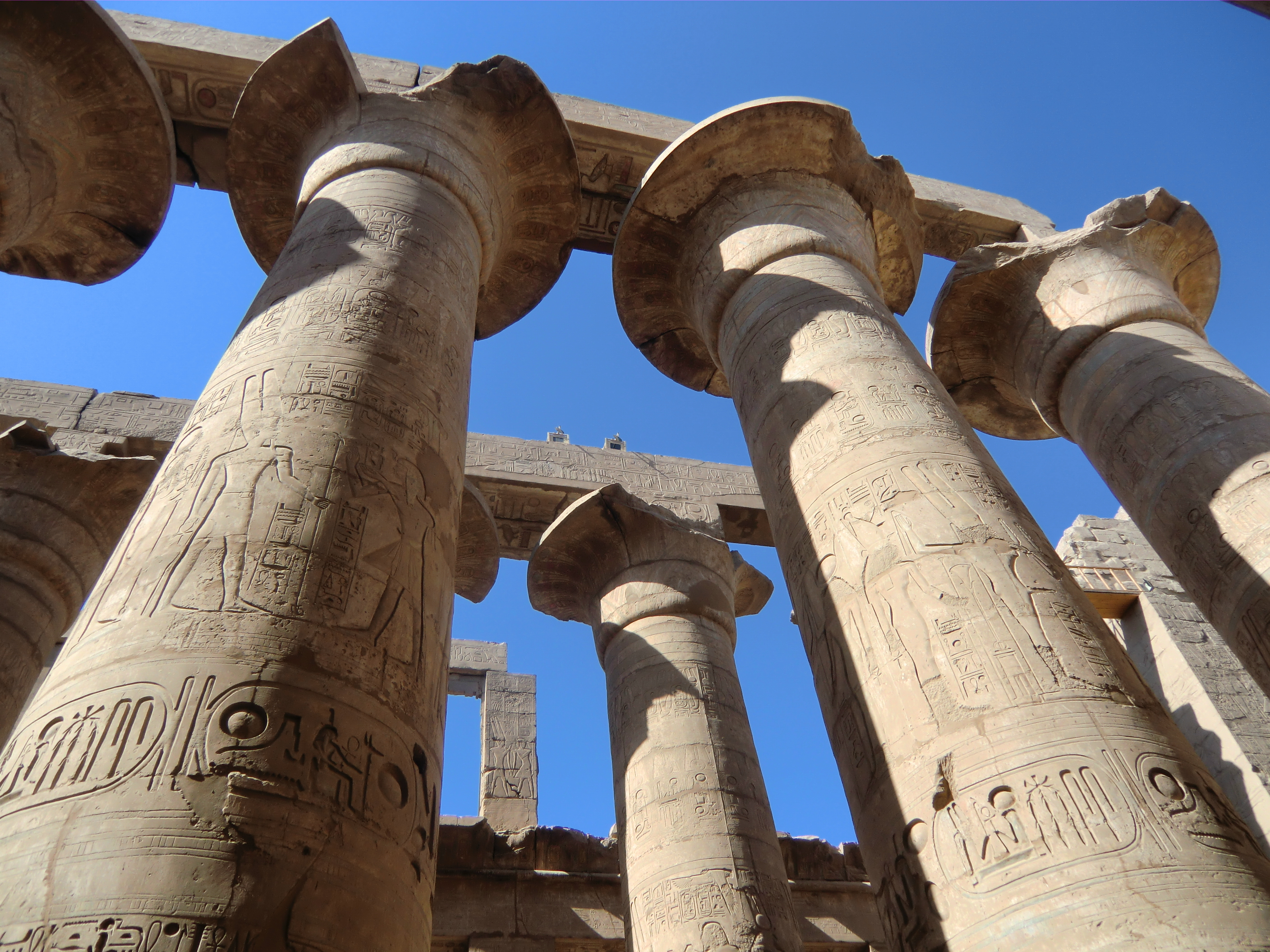
Central columns of the Great Hypostyle Hall in the Temple of Karnak, Egypt

In architecture, a hypostyle (/ˈhaɪpəˌstaɪl, ˈhɪpə-/) hall has a roof which is supported by columns.

== Etymology ==
The term hypostyle comes from the Ancient Greek ὑπόστυλος hypóstȳlos meaning "under columns" (where ὑπό hypó means below or underneath and στῦλος stŷlos means column).

== Technical options ==
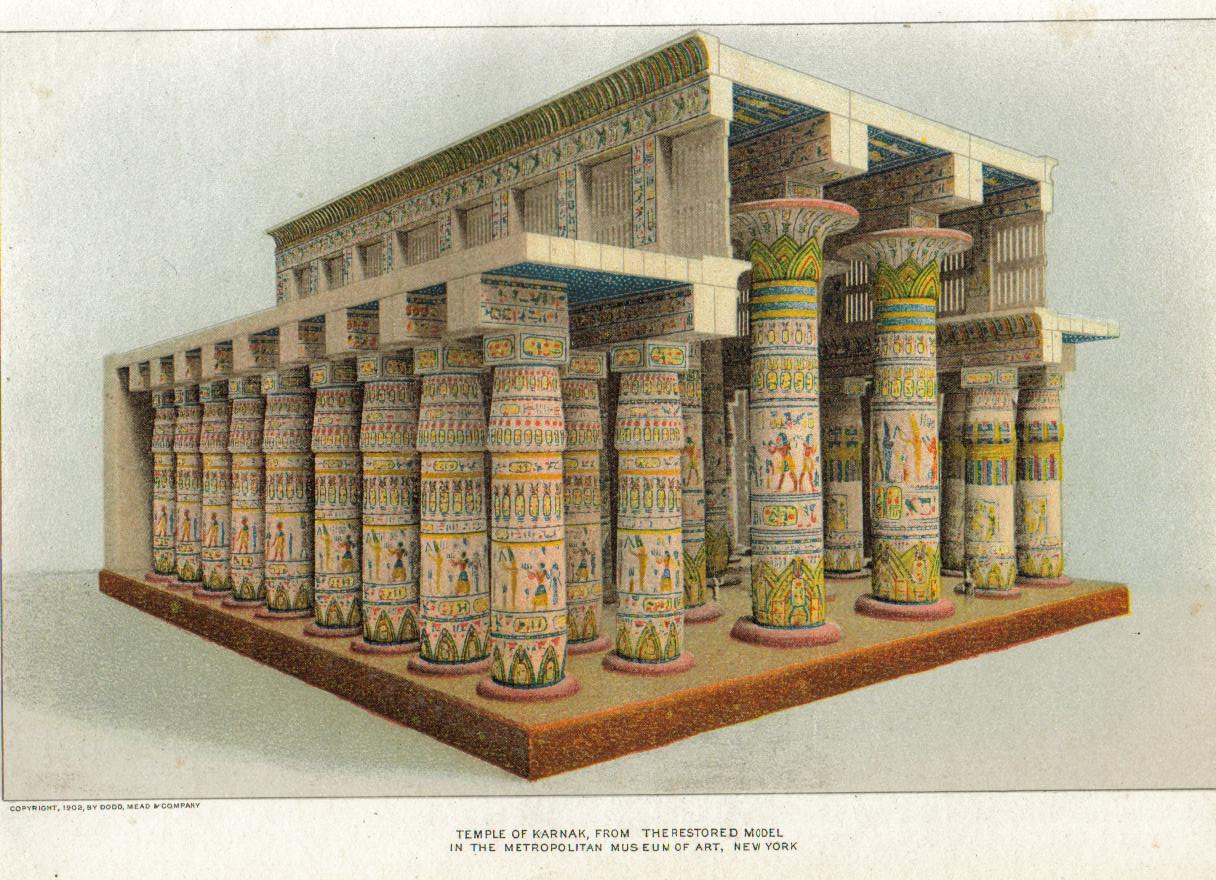
Design of the Great Hypostyle Hall constructed around c. 1290–1224 BC

The roof may be constructed with bridging lintels of stone, wood or other rigid material such as cast iron, steel or reinforced concrete. There may be a ceiling. The columns may be all the same height or, as in the case of the Great Hypostyle Hall at Karnak, the columns flanking the central space may be of greater height rather than those of the side aisles, allowing openings in the wall above the smaller columns, through which light is admitted over the aisle roof, through clerestory windows.

=== Applications ===
The architectural form has many applications, occurring in the cella of ancient Greek temples and in many Asian buildings, particularly of wood construction.

=== Mosques ===
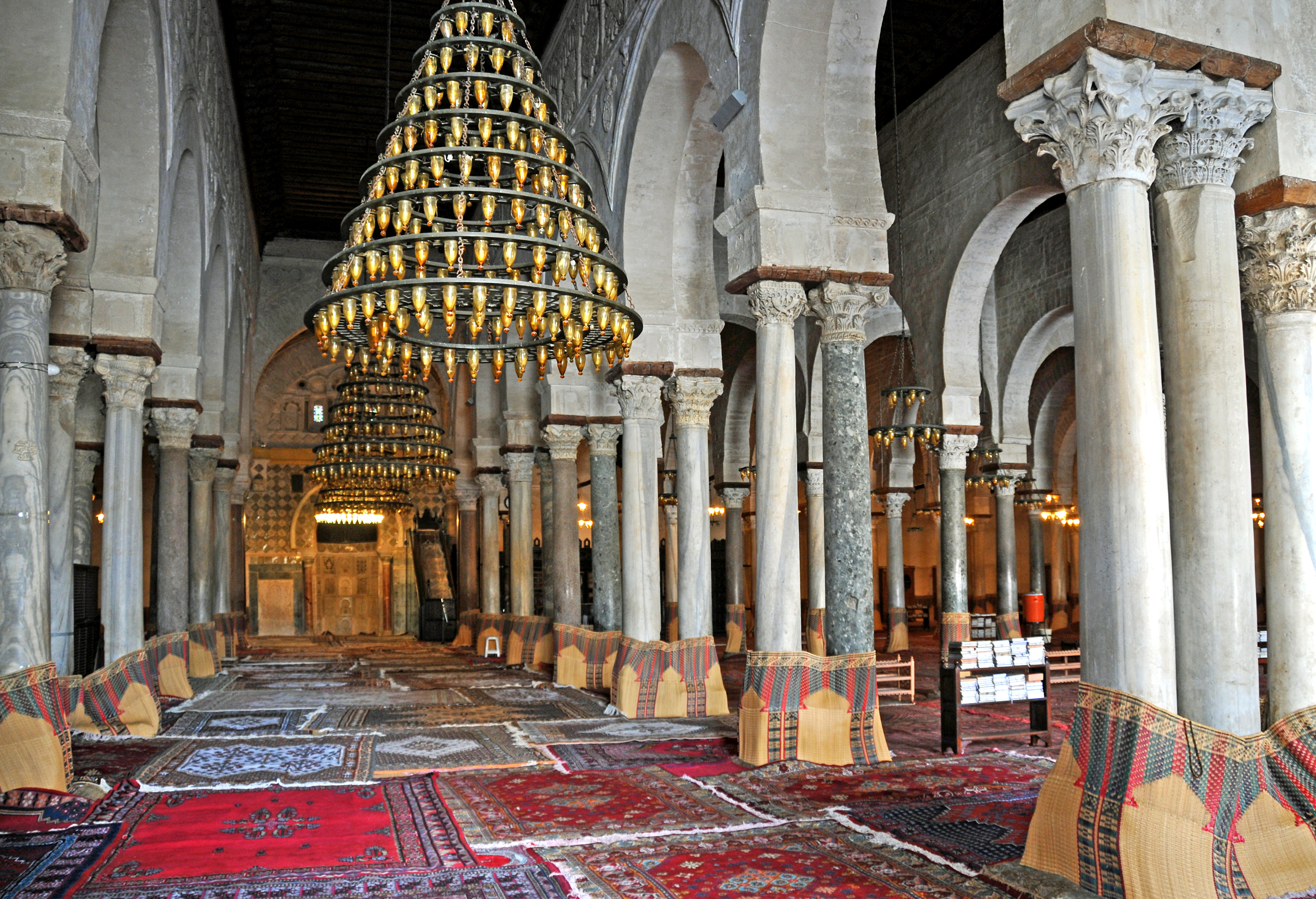
Hypostyle prayer hall of the Great Mosque of Kairouan in Tunisia

With a combination of columns and arches, the hypostyle hall became one of the two main types of mosque construction. In many mosques, especially the early congregational mosques, the prayer hall has the hypostyle form. One of the finest examples of the hypostyle-plan mosques is the Great Mosque of Kairouan (also called the Mosque of Uqba) in the city of Kairouan, Tunisia.

== See also ==
- Ancient Egyptian architecture
- Apadana
- Peristyle
- Portico
