= Talatat =

Limestone blocks used in buildings of the pharaoh Akhenaten

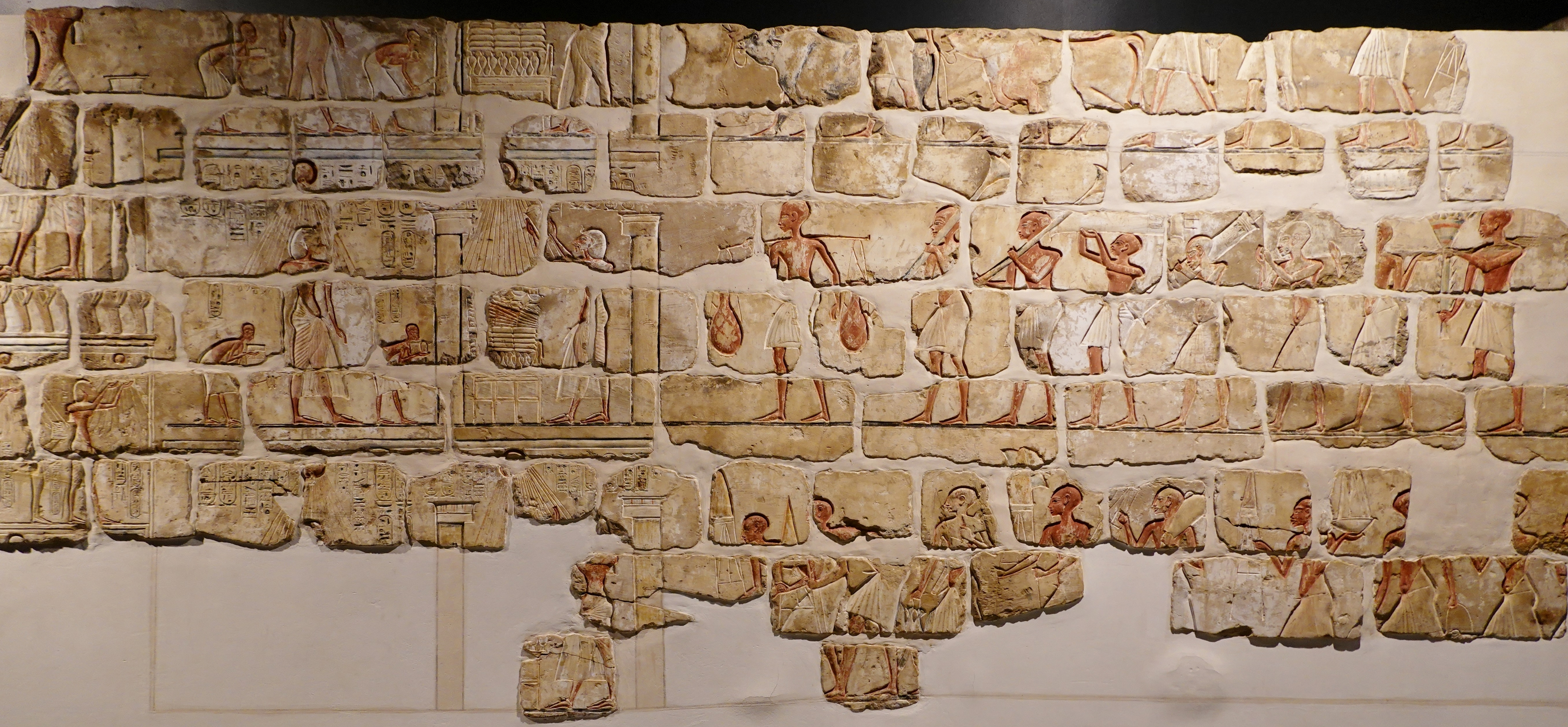
Reconstructed Talatats from the Gempaaten

Talatat are limestone blocks of standardized size (c. 27 by 27 by 54 cm, corresponding to 1/2 by 1/2 by 1 ancient Egyptian cubits) used during the 18th Dynasty reign of the Pharaoh Akhenaten in the building of the Aten temples at Karnak and Akhetaten (modern Amarna). The standardized size and their small weight made construction more efficient. Their use may have begun in the second year of Akhenaten's reign. After the Amarna Period talatat construction was abandoned, apparently not having withstood the test of time.

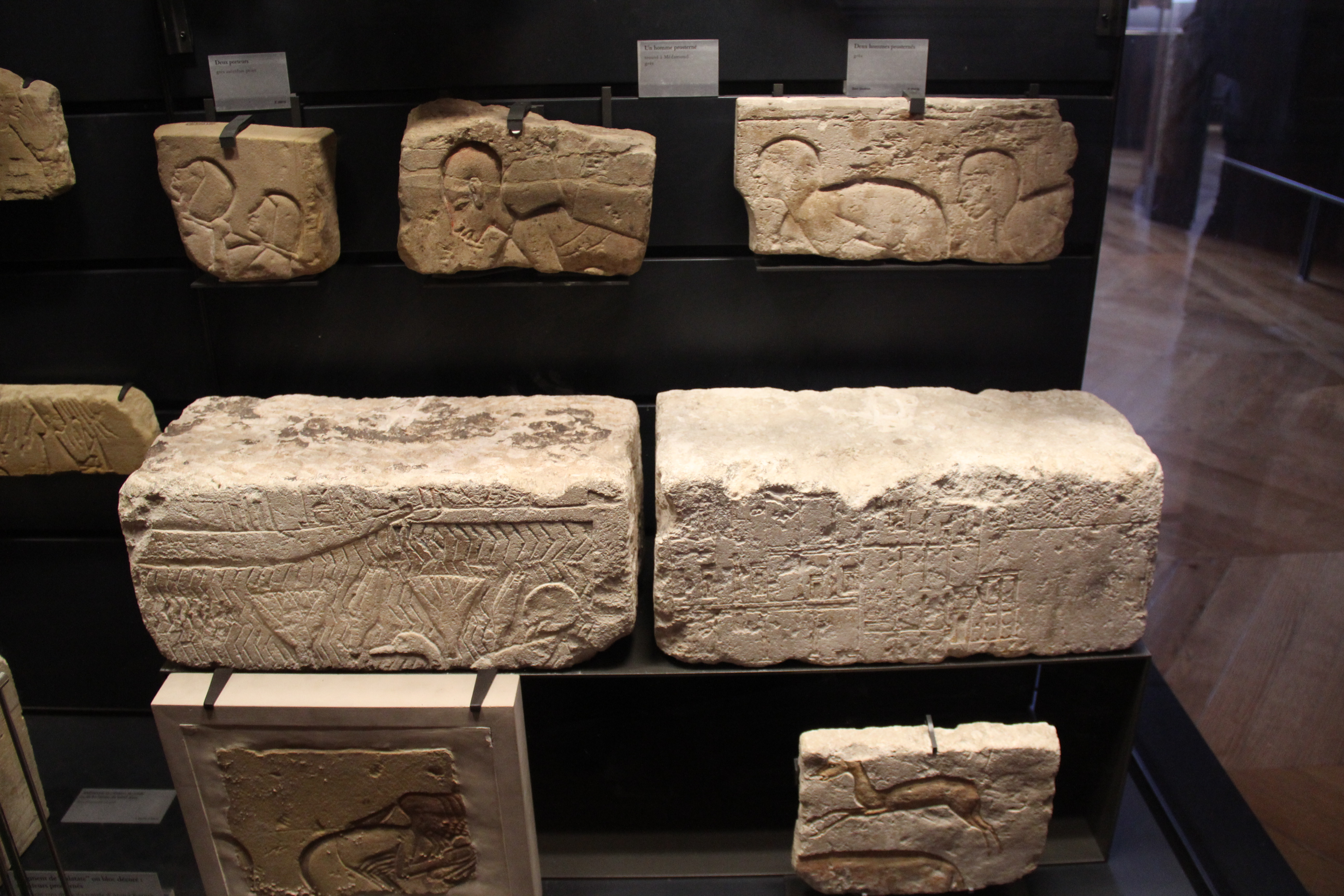
A group in the Louvre

The minority of blocks intended for a visible surface are often decorated in a variety of techniques to make up large scenes covering several blocks. Sunk relief, engraving paint, and sometimes added plaster are used, often in combination.

== Amenhotep IV talatats ==
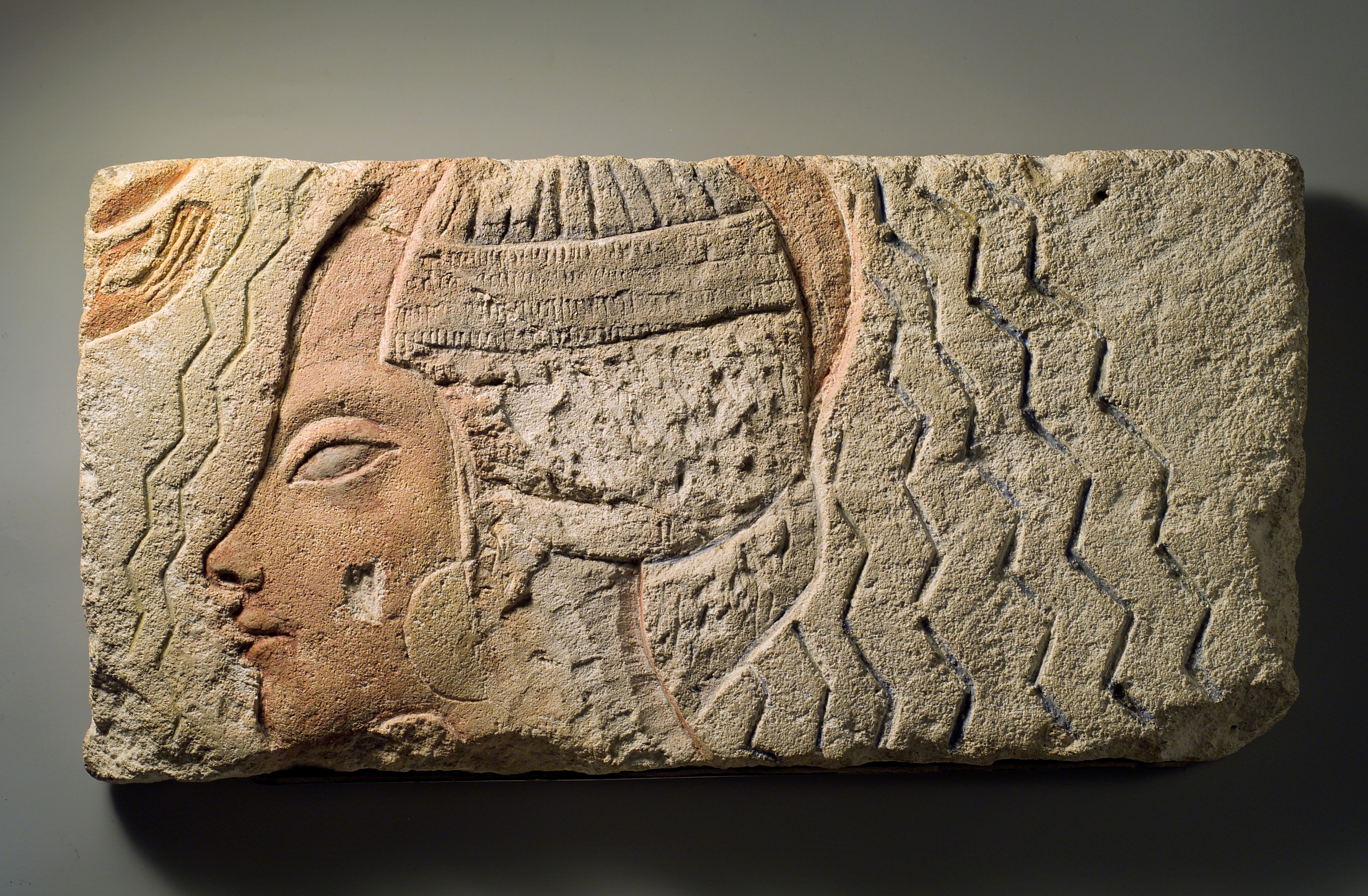
Relief Depicting the Purification of Queen Kiya (?), Metropolitan, New York. Sunk relief and paint, the hair later changed by adding plaster.

The blocks used in the Temple of Amenhotep IV in Karnak, and the other abandoned temples devoted to the deity Aten, were reused by Horemheb and Ramesses II as filler material for pylons and as foundations for large buildings. The Great Hypostyle Hall at Karnak is built on thousands of these blocks, as is the Second Pylon.

Tens of thousands of the talatat have been recovered. The decorated stones are being photographed and the scenes they depict are reconstructed as part of the Akhenaten Temple Project.

== Etymology ==
The term talatat was apparently used by the contemporary Egyptian workmen and introduced into the language of archaeology by the Egyptologist H. Chevrier. There are two hypotheses as to the word's generally unknown ultimate origin in reference to the stones, perhaps not contradictory: The word may be derived from Italian tagliata, meaning cut masonry, or may be derived from the Egyptian Arabic word تلاتة (talāta, 'three'), indicating that each block is three hand-spans long.
