= Precinct of Amun-Re =

Ancient Egyptian precinct within Karnak Temple Complex

Coordinates: 25°43′07″N 32°39′31″E

Map of the Amun-Re Temple (upper portion)

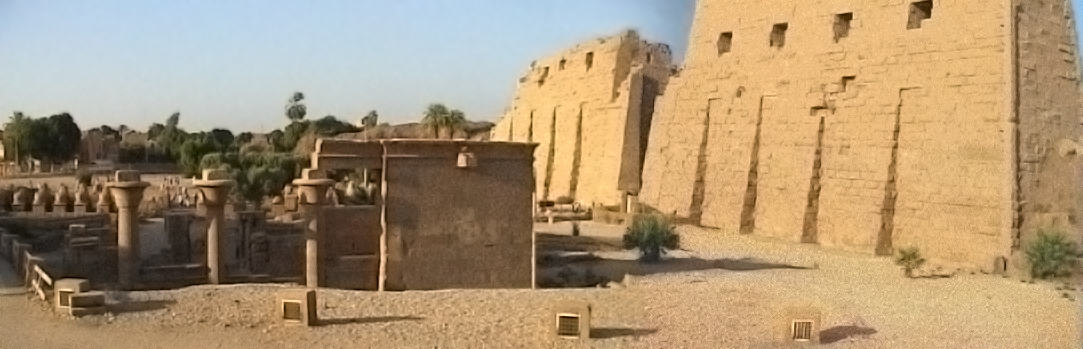
First pylon of Karnak

The Precinct of Amun-Re is an Ancient Egyptian temple precinct, or sacred enclosure, dedicated to Amun-Re, the principal god of the Theban Triad. It is situated near Luxor, Egypt within the immense Karnak Temple Complex. The Precinct covers an area of some 25 ha (62 acres) and is the largest of the four enclosures in the Karnak complex. It contains numerous structures and monuments. Some areas of the Precinct are open to the general public.

The Temple of Amun is the principle structure of the Precinct. Large sections of the North-South Axis including pylons are under active excavation or restoration and are typically closed to the public.

To the southwest is an open-air staging area where archaeologists catalogue and reassemble millions of stone fragments. The temples of Khonsu and Taweret are situated here and are open to the public. The Akhenaten Temple Project is located here, in an enclosure housing ruins of the Temple of Amenhotep IV (Akhenaten).

== History ==
The history of the Karnak complex is largely the history of Thebes. The city does not appear to have been of any significance before the Eleventh Dynasty, and any temple building here would have been relatively small and unimportant, with any shrines being dedicated to the early god of Thebes, Montu. The earliest artifact found in the area of the temple is a small, eight-sided column from the Eleventh Dynasty, which mentions Amun-Ra. The tomb of Intef II mentions a 'house of Amun', which implies some structure, whether a shrine or a small temple is unknown. The ancient name for Karnak, Ipet-Sut (usually translated as 'most select of places') only really refers to the central core structures of the Precinct of Amun-Ra, and was in use as early as the 11th Dynasty, again implying the presence of some form of temple before the Middle Kingdom expansion.

== East/West axis ==
First pylon

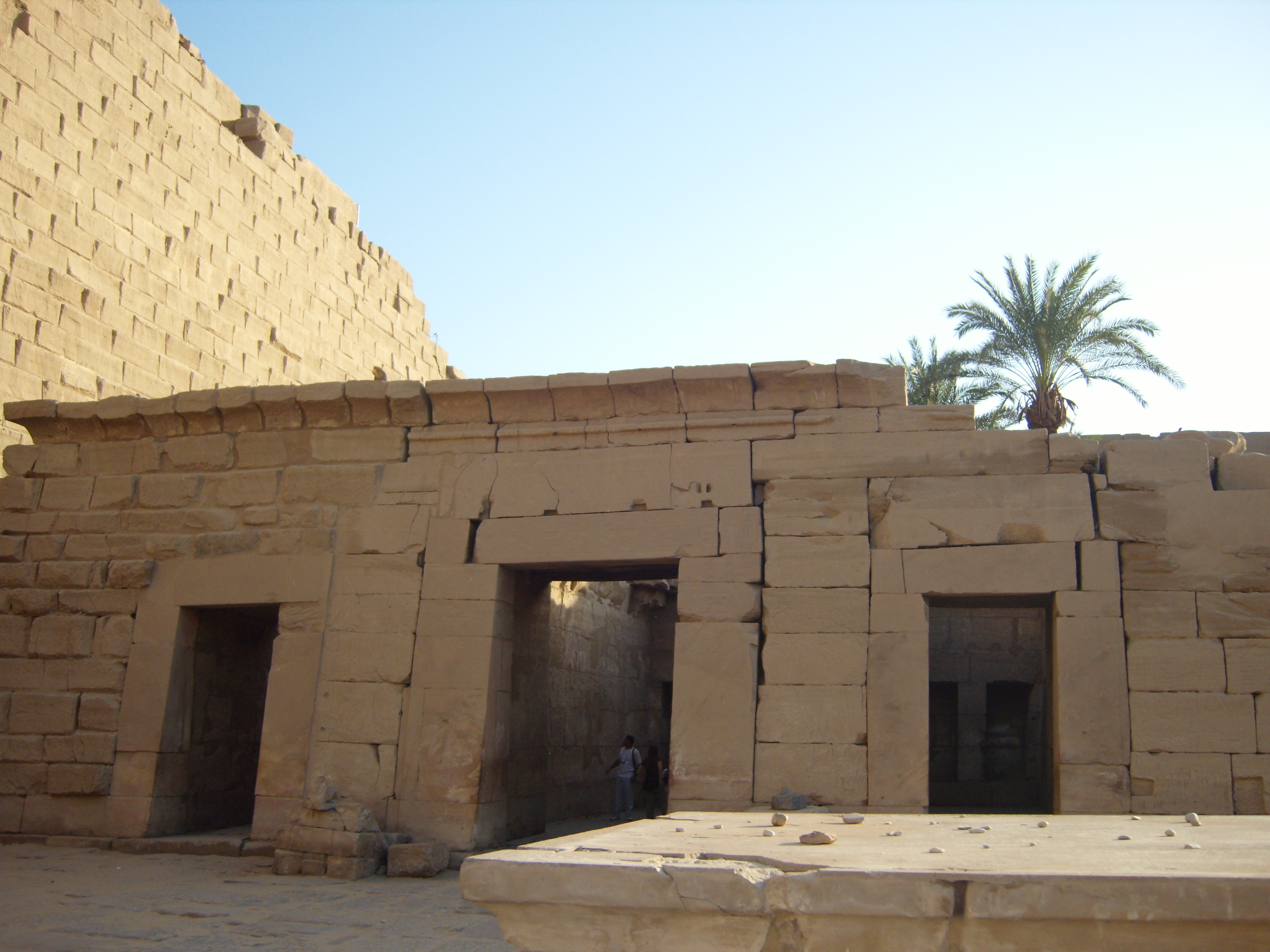
Bark shrines of Seti II

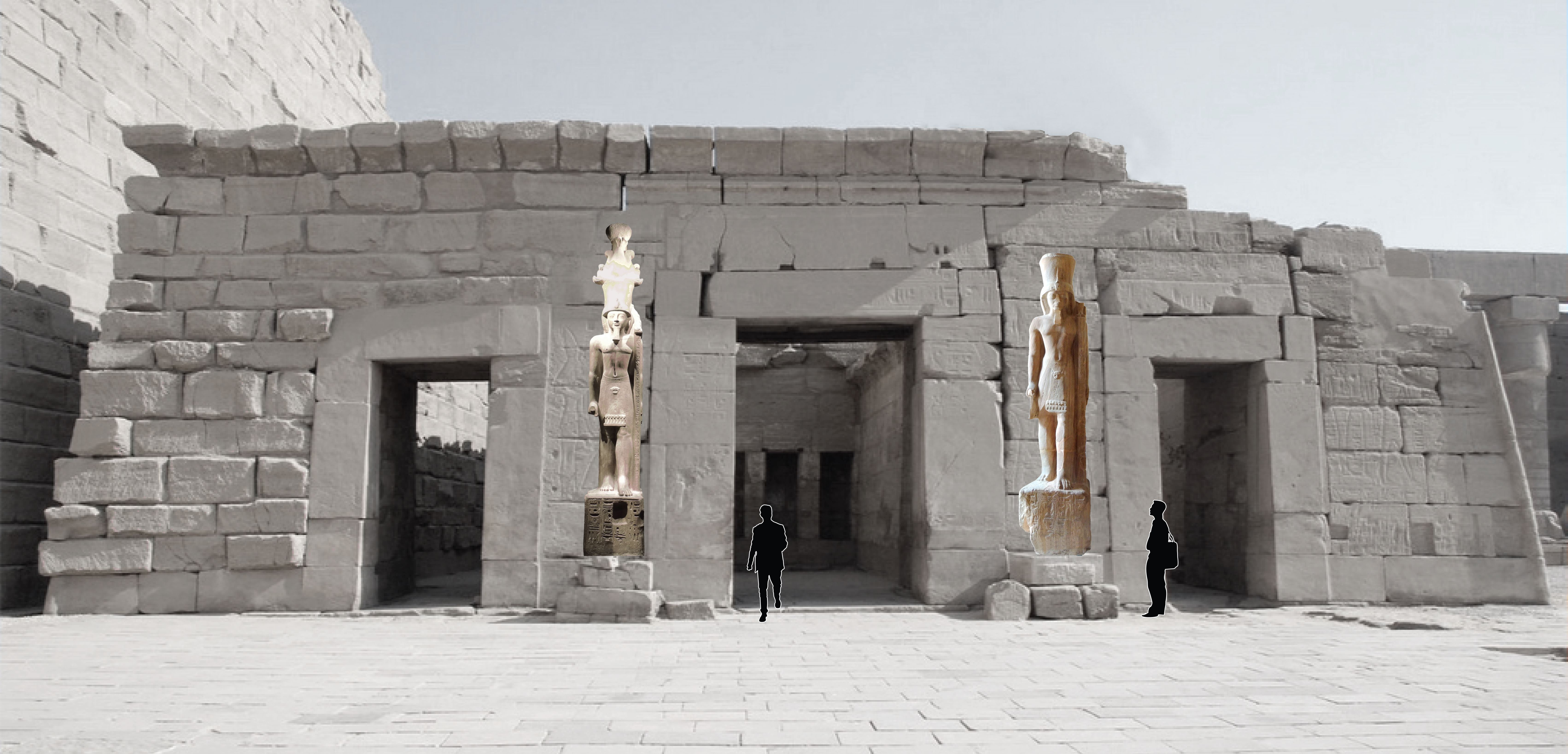
Great courtyard with entrance to the chapels of the sacred boats of Seti II, with the reconstruction of the location of the large statue of the pharaoh now at the Museo Egizio of Turin (on the left) and of another similar (right) at the Louvre.

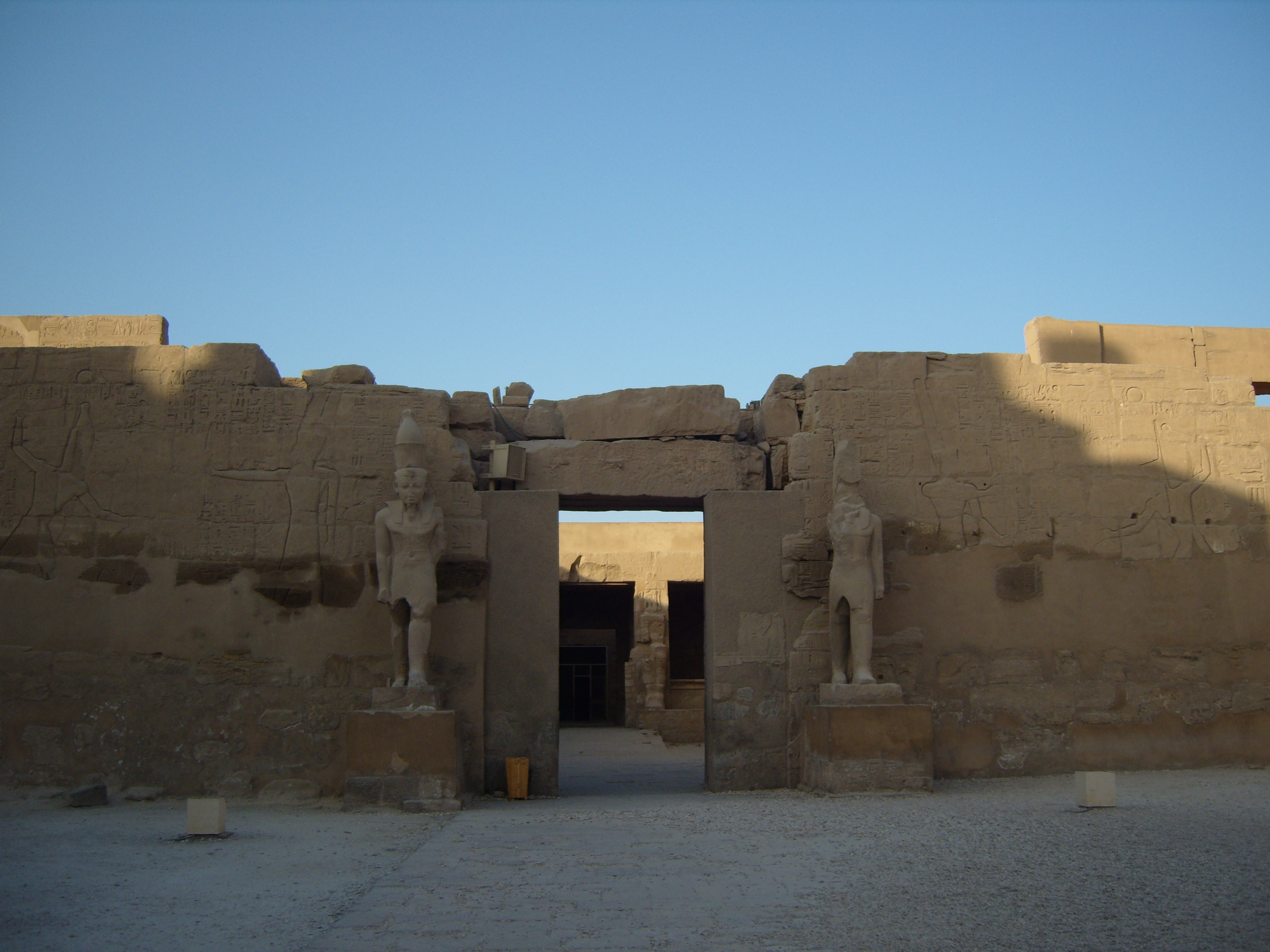
Temple of Ramses III, main entrance

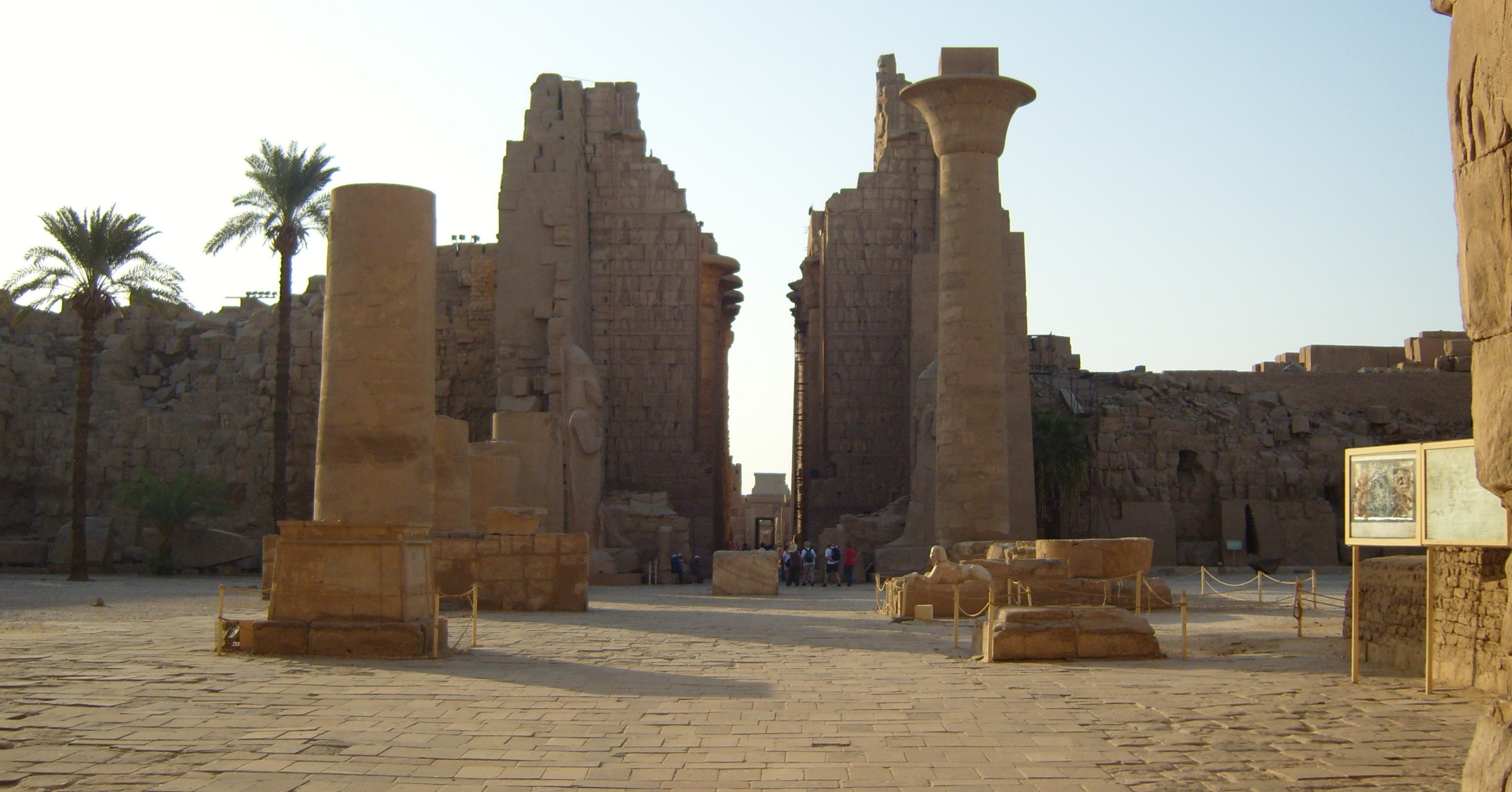
Second pylon photographed from the west side

The main temple is laid out on an east–west axis, entered via a quay (now dry and several hundred metres from the Nile).

=== Cult Terrace ===
The modern entrance is placed over the end of the ancient cult terrace (or tribune), causing most visitors to miss this significant feature. Inscribed into the terrace (though many are now eroded away) are the inundation levels for several kings of the Third Intermediate Period, collectively known as the Nile Level Texts. The cult terrace is often mistakenly thought to be a dock or quay, but other examples, such as the one at the Hathor temple at Deir el-Medina, do not have access to water. It was intended for the presentation of cult images.

=== Corridor of Sphinxes ===
Originally the quay led via a corridor of Sphinxes to the entrance to the second pylon, but these were moved aside when the First Pylon was constructed.

=== First Pylon ===
Construction of the current pylon began during the 30th Dynasty, but was never totally completed. It is 113 m (371 ft) wide and 15 m (49 ft) thick. There are large numbers of mud bricks piled up against the inside of the pylon, and these give a clue as to how it was constructed.

=== Forecourt ===
The construction of the original first pylon and Forecourt in the 22nd Dynasty enclosed several older structures, and meant that the original avenue of sphinxes had to be moved.

==== Boat Shrines ====
These were built in the time of Seti II, and are dedicated to Amun, Mut, and Khonsu.

==== Kiosk of Taharqa ====
In order to construct this kiosk, the criosphinx corridor was removed and the statues moved to the edges of the open court. Only one column remains in place, bearing inscriptions by Taharqa, Psamtik II and Ptolemy IV Philopator.

=== Temple of Ramesses III ===
On the south side of the forecourt, there is a small temple built by Ramesses III. Inscriptions inside the temple show the king slaughtering captives, whilst Amun-Re looks on.

=== Bubastis Portal ===
This portal allows exit from the first court to the area to the south of the Temple of Ramesses III. It records the conquests and military campaigns in Syria-Palestine of Shoshenq I, of the Twenty-second Dynasty.

=== Second Pylon ===
This pylon was built by Horemheb near the end of his reign and only partly decorated by him. Ramesses I usurped Horemheb's reliefs and inscriptions on the pylon and added his own to them. These were later usurped by Ramesses II. The east (rear) face of the pylon became the west wall of the newly built Great Hypostyle Hall under Seti I who added some honorary images of the late Ramesses I to compensate for having had to erase his father's images there when he built the hall.

Horemheb filled the interior of the pylon towers with thousands of recycled blocks from dismantled monuments of his predecessors, especially Talatat blocks from the monuments of Akhenaten along with a temple of Tutankhamen and Ay.

The Second Pylon's roof collapsed in late antiquity and was later restored in Ptolemaic times.

=== Great Hypostyle Hall ===
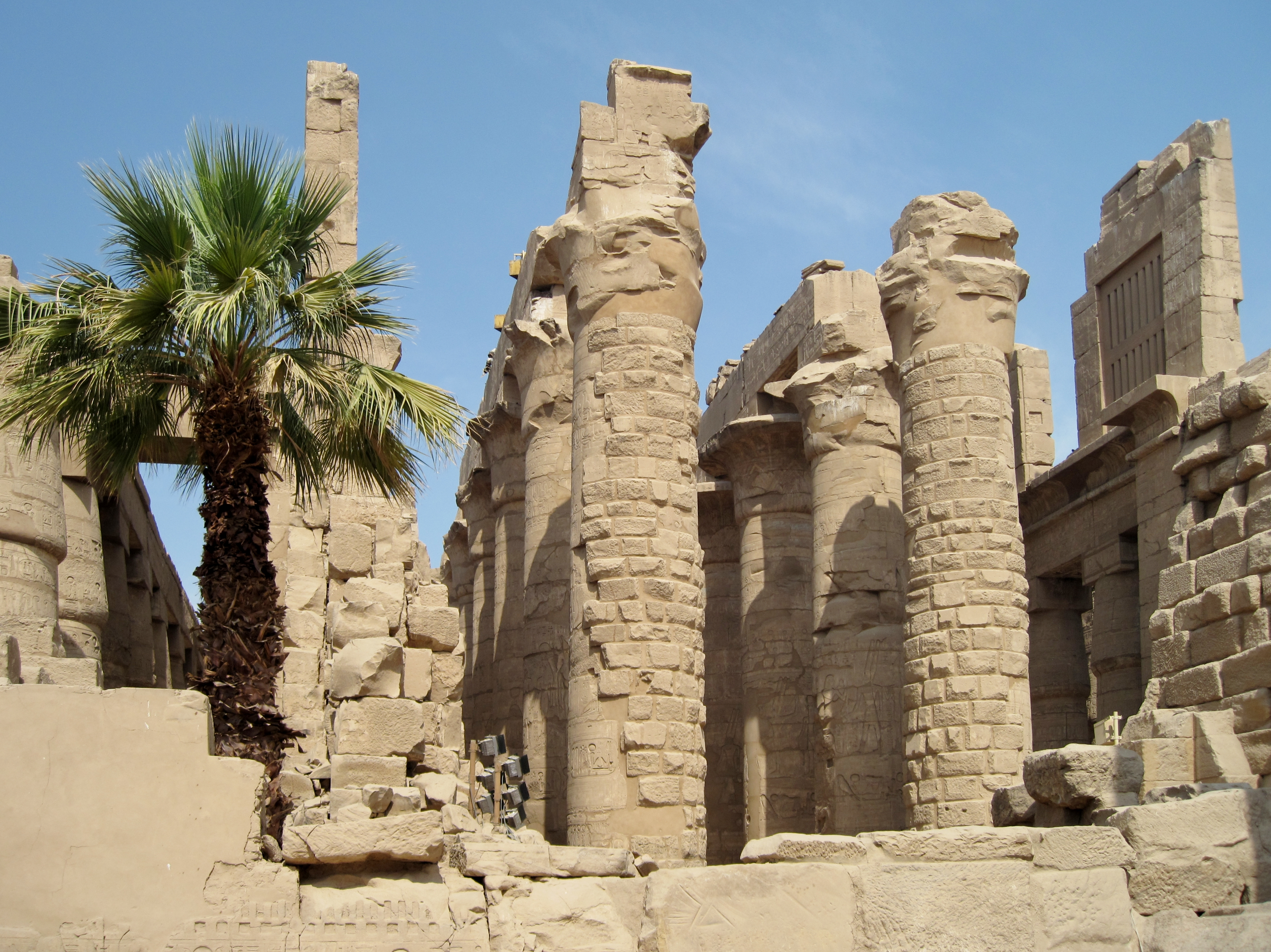
Columns of the Great Hypostyle Hall

This was begun by Seti I, and completed by Ramesses II. The north side of the hall is decorated in raised relief, and was Seti I's work. He began to decorate the southern side of the hall shortly before he died but this section was largely completed by his son, Ramesses II. Ramesses decoration was at first in raised relief, but he quickly changed to sunk relief and then converted his raised relief decoration in the southern part of the hall, along with the few reliefs of Seti there, to sunk relief. He left Seti I's reliefs in the north wing as raised relief. Ramesses also changed Seti's names to his own along the main east–west axis of the Hall and along the northern part of the north–south processional route while respecting most of his father's reliefs elsewhere in the hall.

The outer walls depict scenes of battle, Seti I on the north and Ramesses II on the south. These scenes may not show actual combat, but could have a ritual purpose as well. Adjoining the southern wall of Ramesses II is another wall that contains the text of the peace treaty he signed with the Hittites in the year 21 of his reign.

=== Third Pylon ===
Through the walls of the Hypostyle Hall is the mostly ruined Transverse Hall, alongside a reconstructed Third Pylon of Amenhotep III. Though much ruined, in antiquity it was quite splendid and parts of it were even plated in gold by pharaoh Amenhotep III. A vestibule was added late in the pharaoh's reign and then partly decorated with incompleted triumph scenes by Amenhotep IV/Akhenaten before the new pharaoh abandoned the project due to his religious revolution which rejected the cult of the god Amun-Re.

In building the Third Pylon, Amenhotep dismantled a number of older monuments, including a small gateway he himself built earlier in the reign. He deposited hundreds of blocks from these monuments inside the pylon towers as fill. These were recovered by Egyptologists in the early 20th century and led to the reconstruction of several lost monuments, including the White Chapel of Senusret I and the red chapel of Queen Hatshepsut, which are now in the open-air museum at Karnak. At the time of its construction, Amenhotep III had the Third Pylon gilded and covered with precious stones, as he relates on a stela now in the Cairo museum:

The king made a monument for Amun, making for him a very great gateway before Amun-Re lord of the thrones of the two lands, sheathed entirely in gold, a divine image according to respect, filled with turquoise [one-half ton], sheathed in gold and numerous stones [two-thirds ton of jasper]. The like had never been made... Its pavement was made of pure silver, its front portal inset with stelae of lapis lazuli, one on each side. Its twin towers approach heaven, like the four supports of the sky. Its flagpoles shine skyward sheathed in electrum.

The reliefs on the pylon were later restored by Tutankhamen who also inserted images of himself. These were, in turn, later erased by Horemheb. The erased images of Tutankhamen were long thought to be of Akhenaten himself, supposedly evidence of a coregency between Akhenaten and Amenhotep III, though most scholars now reject this.

=== Thutmose I and Hatshepsut's obelisks ===
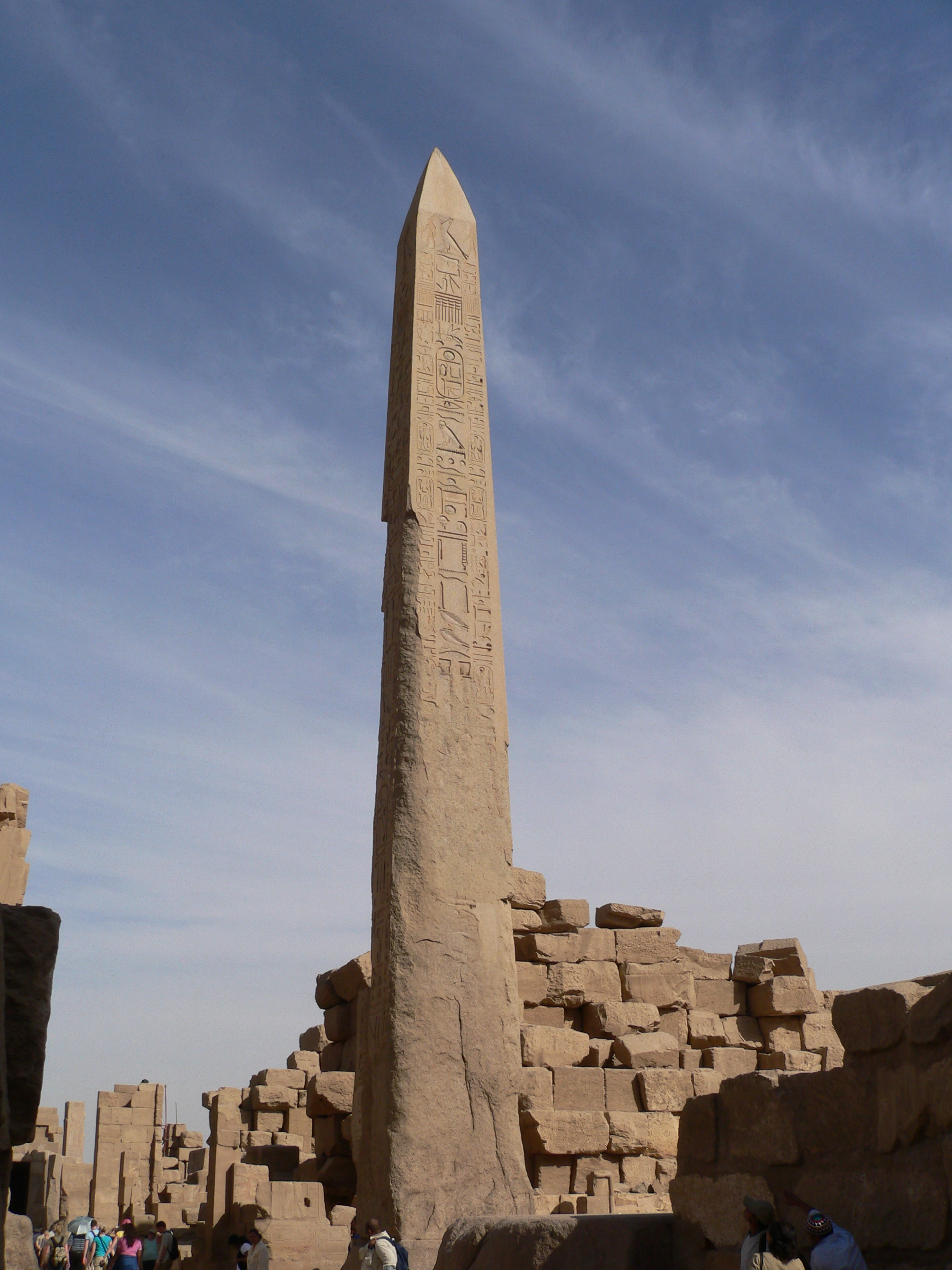
The obelisk of Thutmose I between the 3rd and 4th Pylon, 18th Dynasty

In a narrow court, there are several obelisks, one which dates from Thutmose I, and is 21.2 m (70 ft) high and weighs nearly 150 tons. Just beyond this is the remaining obelisk of Hatshepsut, nearly 30 m (98 ft) in height. Later kings blocked out the view of this from ground level, and constructed walls around it. Its companion lies, broken, by the sacred lake.

=== Fourth and Fifth Pylons ===
These were built by Thutmose I.

=== Sixth Pylon ===
The Sixth Pylon was built by Thutmose III, and leads into a Hall of Records in which the king recorded his tributes. The pylon also includes some images of the god Amun which were restored by Tutankhamen after they were vandalized by Akhenaten. These images were later recarved by Horemheb who also usurped Tutankhamun's restoration inscriptions.

=== Sanctuary of Philip Arrhidaeus ===
The sanctuary was built in the time of Philip Arrhidaeus, on the site of the earlier sanctuary built by Thutmose III. This sanctuary contains blocks from the earlier sanctuary and older inscriptions can still be seen.

=== Middle-Kingdom Structures ===
A pillar inscribed with the name of Intef II, an 11th Dynasty pharaoh, was discovered in the early 1980s.

The so-called "Middle Kingdom courtyard" in the center of the Karnak complex has been investigated since the 19th century. It had been theorized that a sanctuary of Amun was located here, until the Franco-Egyptian Center for Studies of the Temples of Karnak (CFEETK)'s inaugural 2002 season revealed symmetrical raw brick foundations more than 33 m wide in the courtyard of the sixth pylon, about thirty meters west of the Middle Kingdom courtyard. Five years of work have uncovered a religious complex approximately 70 m wide by more than 100 m long, "probably composed of concentric enclosures and peribolus walls surrounding stores, a front access platform and the "god's abode." This complex seems to have been founded on a large area developed by the construction of earthwork walls, without traces of older architectural remains."

=== Festival Hall of Thutmose III ===
This stands to the east of the main temple complex. Between the sanctuary and the festival hall is an open space, and this is thought to be where the original Middle Kingdom shrines and temples were located, before their later dismantling.

The Festival Hall (or Akh-menu – "the most glorious of monuments") itself has its axis at right-angles to the main east–west axis of the temple. It was originally built to celebrate the jubilee (Hed-Sed) of Thutmose III, and later became used as part of the annual Opet Festival. In this temple, the Karnak king list, shows Thutmose III with some of the earlier kings that built parts of the temple complex. It contains the Botanical garden of Thutmosis III.

== North/South Axis ==
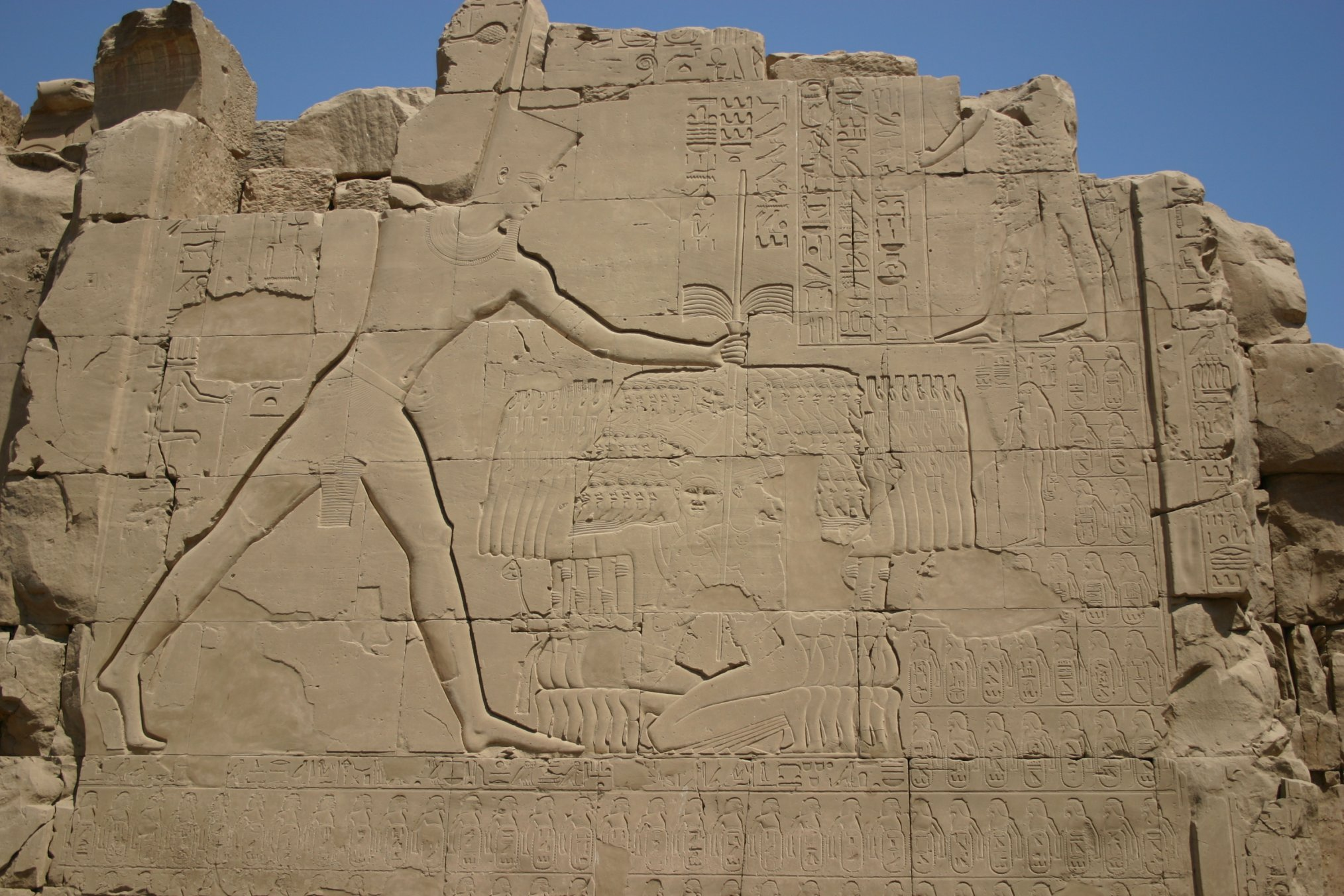
Thutmose III smiting his Asiatic enemies

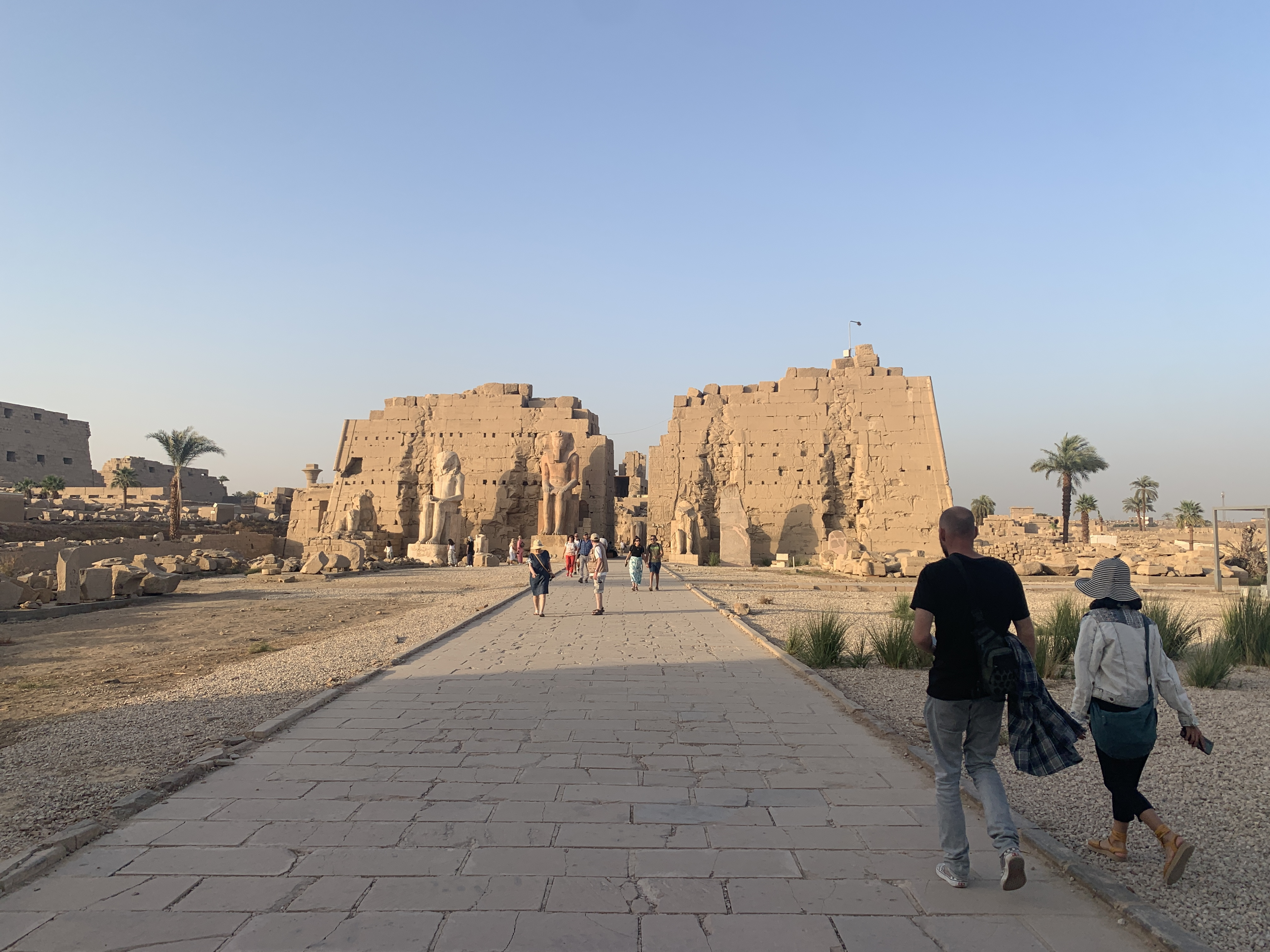
The Eighth Pylon

The Ninth Pylon

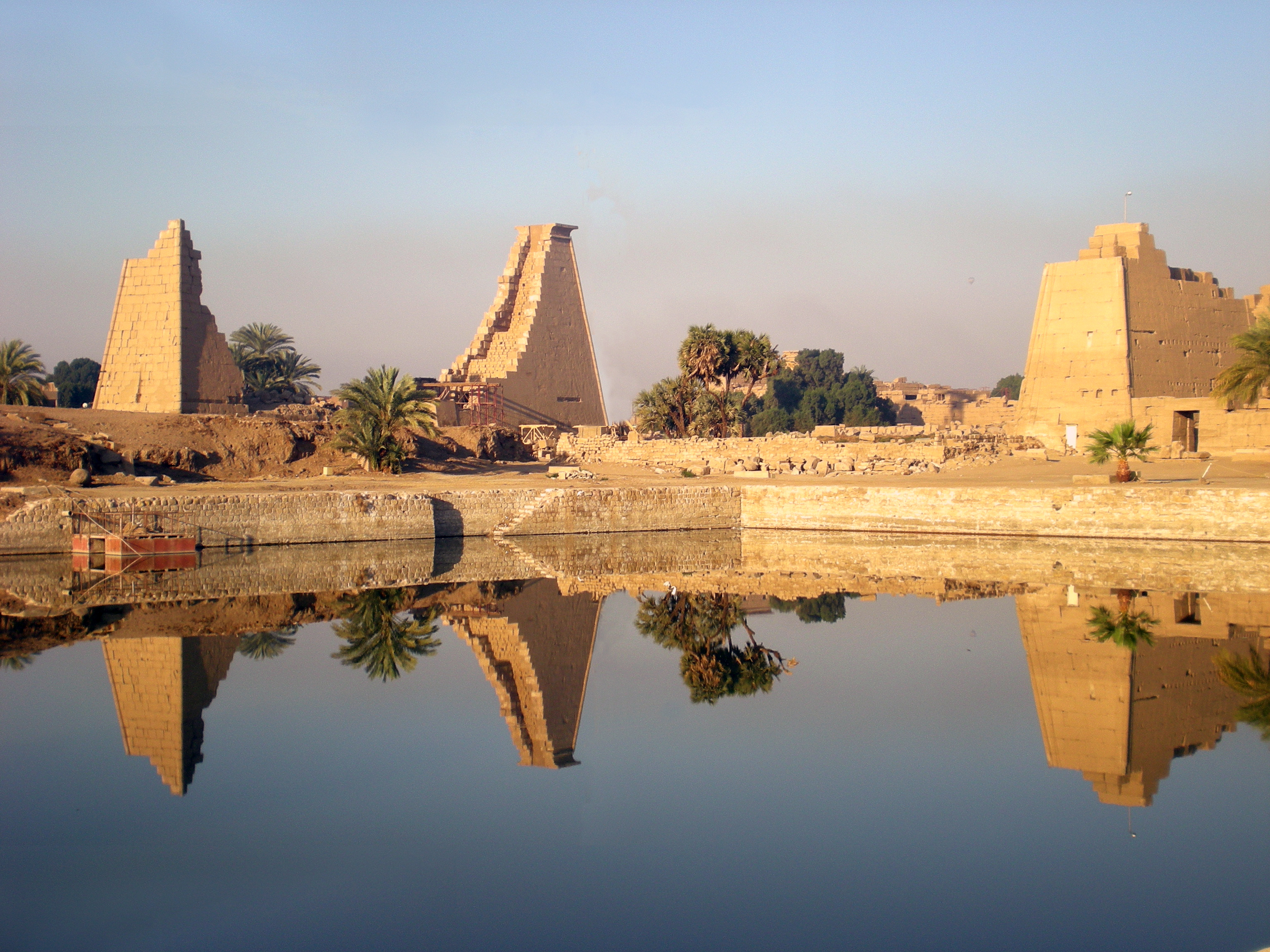
The Sacred Lake of Precinct of Amun-Re

This axis, with its massive pylons, heads off to the Precinct of Mut. Most of this area is off limits to tourists, as it is under active reconstruction and excavation.

=== First Court (Cachette Court) ===
Over 900 statues were discovered in 1903 by Georges Legrain buried under this open court. These had been buried there, probably in the Ptolemaic period, during one of the clearances of the complex for rebuilding or construction.

=== Seventh Pylon ===
On the southern side, there is a carving of Thutmose III smiting Asiatic enemies, under which is a list of names of towns and peoples conquered in his campaigns in Syria-Palestine.

The famous Karnak Cachette of nearly 800 stone statues and 17,000 bronze statues, as well as other artifacts were found buried here by Georges Legrain around 1903-1905.

=== Second Court ===
Off to the eastern side of the court is an alabaster shrine, constructed for the jubilee of Thutmose III.

=== Eighth Pylon ===
Constructed by Hatshepsut, the eighth pylon marks the end of the area that is normally accessible to the public.

=== Ninth Pylon ===
This pylon was constructed (or at least completed) by Horemheb. It is hollow and allows access to its top, via internal staircases.

=== Tenth Pylon ===
Again, it was Horemheb who built this last pylon, using the talatat from the dismantled Temple of Amenhotep IV as core building material. There are four registers of scenes around the gateway, in the name of Horemheb.

== Other Structures ==
Located within the outer precincts of the complex are a number of other structures, some of which are accessible to the public.

=== Sacred Lake ===
The sacred lake was where priests purified themselves before performing rituals in the temple. The sound and light show is now viewed from a seating area next to the lake.

=== Temple of Ptah ===
This small temple lies to the north of the main Amun temple, just within the boundary wall. The building was erected by Thutmose III, on the site of an earlier Middle Kingdom temple. The building was later enlarged by the Ptolemies.

=== Temple of Ramesses II ===
Also known as the Temple of the Hearing Ear this temple is located to the east of the main complex, on the east–west alignment. It was built during the reign of Ramesses II.

=== Temple of Khonsu ===
This temple is an example of an almost complete New Kingdom temple, and was originally constructed by Ramesses III, on the site of an earlier temple (the construction seems to be mentioned in the Harris Papyrus).

== Open Air Museum ==
Several of the pylons reused earlier structures in their core. In the Open Air Museum, located in the Northwest corner of the complex, there are reconstructions of some of these earlier structures, notable amongst them the Chapelle Rouge of Hatshepsut, and the White Chapel of Senusret I.
