= List of children of Ramesses II =

The Ancient Egyptian pharaoh Ramesses II had a large number of children: between 48 and 50 sons, and 40 to 53 daughters – whom he had depicted on several monuments.

Ramesses apparently treated nearly all his children equally. All the princes are listed in order of age in the list of princes. At the entrance of the Greater Abu Simbel temple, statues were erected for several of his eldest daughters and sons; the mothers of three of the royal children identified there are unknown; the statue of the sixth daughter bears no inscribed name, as with the royal children of Ramesses III at Medinet Habu. For images of royal children that were never inscribed with names, they existed more as representations of a status than as specific, living individuals. Nevertheless, Ramesses II did to some extent differentiate among his children, particularly his sons. For example, only the two eldest sons – born to Nefertari and Isetnofret respectively – are mentioned by name in Ramesses II's letters to Ḫattušili III. Only the eldest son was allowed to write independently to Ḫattušili III. In the prince list, besides the two eldest sons, who were born to different mothers, the third son, Pareherwenemef, who was born to Nefertari, was likewise distinguished from his younger brothers by more elaborate attire and a longer titulary. If, apart from age, their maternal lineage was also a consideration, then Ramesses II did to some degree distinguish the sons of Nefertari from those of Isetnofret; for in the prince list of Ramesses III the first four princes are all set apart from their younger brothers, but Ramesses II distinguished only the first three, excluding his fourth son, Khaemweset, who was born to Isetnofret. Only Nefertari's children were depicted in the smaller temple dedicated to her. Ramesses II had eight great royal wives in his lifetime. In addition to Nefertari and Isetnofret, they included his own daughters Bintanath, Meritamen, Nebettawy, Henuttawy and Henutmire, as well as Maathorneferure, daughter of the Hittite king. His other queens included another daughter of the Hittite king and foreign princesses from other royal houses, including a Babylonian princess. Apart from Maathorneferure, there is no evidence that any of these queens bore children, including Bintanath and Nebettawy, who were once thought to have each borne a daughter.

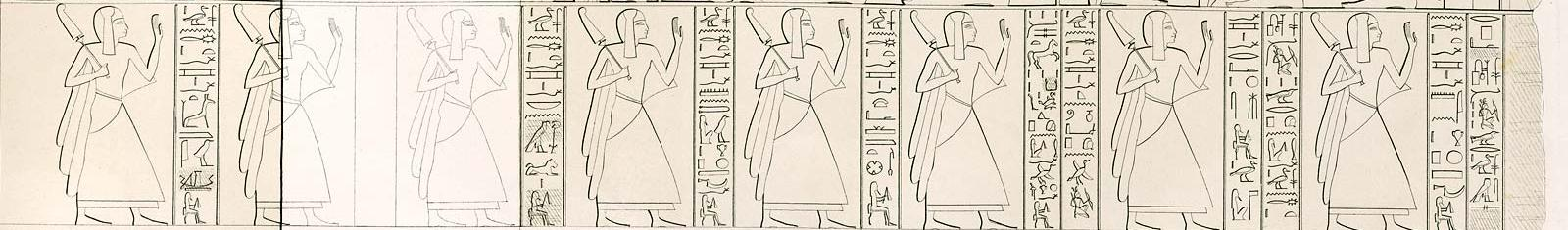
The first eight sons of Ramesses: Amun-her-khepeshef, Ramesses, Pareherwenemef, Khaemwaset, Montuherkhepeshef, Nebenkharu, Meryamun and Sethemwia. Temple Wadi es-Sebua

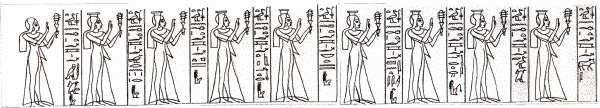
A procession of the first nine daughters of Ramesses: Bintanath, Baketmut, Nefertari, Meritamen, Nebettawy, Isetnofret, Henuttawy, Werenro and Nedjemmut. Most of his children are known to us from processions like this.

The first few children of Ramesses usually appear in the same order on depictions. Lists of princes and princesses were found in the Ramesseum, Luxor, Wadi es-Sebua and Abydos. Some names are known to us from ostraca, tombs and other sources. The sons of Ramesses appear on depictions of battles and triumphs–such as the Battle of Kadesh and the siege of the Syrian city of Dapur–already early in his reign (Years 5 and 10, respectively), thus it is likely that several of them were born before he ascended to the throne. Many of his sons were buried in the tomb KV5.

Ramesses' efforts to have his children depicted on several of his monuments are in contradiction with the earlier tradition of keeping royal children, especially boys in the background unless they held important official titles. This was probably caused by the fact that his family was not of royal origin and he wanted to stress their royal status.

== Sons ==
1. Amunherkhepeshef (“Amun Is with His Strong Arm”), firstborn son of Nefertari; crown prince until his death in Year 25. He is likely to be the same person as Seth-her-khepeshef or Sethirkopshef.
2. Ramesses (“Born of Ra”), eldest son of Isetnofret, crown prince between Years 25 and 50.
3. Pareherwenemef (“Ra Is with His Right Arm”), Nefertari's second son. Appears on depictions of the triumph after the Battle of Kadesh and in the smaller Abu-Simbel temple. He was never crown prince; it is likely he predeceased his elder brothers.
4. Khaemweset (“He who appears/appeared in Thebes”), Isetnofret's second son, "the first Egyptologist", crown prince between years 50 and 55.
5. Mentuherkhepeshef A (“Montu Is with His Strong/Right Arm”) was mentioned on a stela from Bubastis. A statue of him is in Copenhagen. He was present at the siege of Dapur. He was never crown prince; it is likely he predeceased his elder brothers.
6. Nebenkharu (“Lord of the Asiatic Lands”) Troop commander. Prince Nebenkharu was present at the battle of Kadesh and at a battle in the North (Qode). He was never crown prince; it is likely he predeceased his elder brothers.
7. Ramesses-Meryamun (“Beloved of Amun”) was present at the triumph and the siege; was buried in KV5 where fragments of his canopic jars were found. He was never crown prince; it is likely he predeceased his elder brothers.
8. Amunemwia or Sethemwia (“Amun/Set in the Divine Barque”) also appears at Dapur. He changed his name from Amunemwia to Sethemwia around the same time when his eldest brother changed it. He was never crown prince; it is likely he predeceased his elder brothers.
9. Seti A (“Man of Set”) was also present at Kadesh and Dapur. He was never crown prince; it is likely he predeceased his elder brothers. He was buried in KV5 – where two of his canopic jars were found – around Year 53. On his funerary equipment his name is spelled Sutiy. He might have been identical with another Seti, mentioned on an ostracon which is now in the Egyptian Museum in Cairo.
10. Setepenre (“Chosen of Ra”) was present at Dapur too. He was never crown prince; it is likely he predeceased his elder brothers.
11. Meryre (“Beloved of Ra”) was the son of Nefertari. He was never crown prince; it is likely he predeceased his elder brothers. It is likely that he died at a young age; a brother of his (18th on the list of princes) was probably named after him.
12. Horherwenemef (“Horus Is with His Right Arm”) was never crown prince; it is likely he predeceased his elder brothers.
13. Merneptah (“Beloved of Ptah”), son of Isetnofret, crown prince after the 55th year, then pharaoh.
14. Amenhotep (“Amun Is Pleased”)
15. Itamun (“Amun Is The Father”)
16. Meryatum (“Beloved of Atum”), son of Nefertari. High Priest of Heliopolis.
17. Nebentaneb (“Lord of All Lands”)
18. Meryre (“Beloved of Ra”) was probably named after a brother of his (11th on the list of princes).
19. Amunemopet (“Amun on the Opet Feast”)
20. Senakhtenamun (“Amun Gives Him Strength”) is likely to have been resided in Memphis, as it is suggested by a votive plaque belonging to his servant Amenmose.
21. Ramesses-Merenre (“The one whom Ra has loved”)
22. Thutmose (“Born of Thoth”)
23. Simentu (“Son of Montu”) was the overseer of the royal vineyards in Memphis. He was married to Iryet, daughter of a Syrian captain, Benanath.
24. Mentuemwaset (“Montu appears in Thebes”)
25. Siamun (“Son of Amun”)
26. Ramesses-Siptah (“Son of Ptah”) was probably the son of a secondary wife called Sutererey. A relief of them is in the Louvre. A Book of the Dead, which was probably his, is now in Florence.
27. Unknown
28. Mentuenheqau ("Montu is with the rulers")

From the Abydos procession:

19. Ramesses-Siatum (“Son of Atum”)
20. [Ramesses-…]pare
22. Ramesses-Userkhepesh (“Strong of Arm”)
23. Ramesses-Meryseth (“Beloved of Set”) is known from a stone block from the Ramesseum, reused in Medinet Habu. and is named on a stela, a door lintel and on a doorjamb.
24. Ramesses-Sikhepri ("Son of Khepri")
25. Ramesses-Merymaat (“Beloved of Maat”)
26. Ramesses-Meryastarte (“Beloved of Astarte”)

From Wadi es-Sebua:

48. Ramesses-Meretmire ("Loving like Ra")

The following sons of Ramesses are known from various sources other than lists:

- Astarteherwenemef (“Astarte Is with His Right Arm”) is shown on a stone block originally from the Ramesseum, reused in Medinet Habu. His name shows Asian influence like that of Bintanath and Mahiranath.
- Geregtawy (“Peace of the Two Lands”) is known from a stone block, from the Ramesseum, reused in Medinet Habu.
- Merymontu (“Beloved of Montu”) was depicted in Wadi es-Sebua and Abydos.
- Neben[…] is mentioned on an ostracon in Cairo.
- Ramesses-Maatptah (“Justice of Ptah”) is only known from a letter, in which the palace servant Meryotef rebukes him. It's possible that Ramesses-Maatptah is a misspelling of (Ramesses-)Merenptah.
- Ramesses-Meryamun-Nebweben (“Beloved of Amun, Lord of Sunshine”), is known from his coffin's inscriptions.
- Ramesses-Paitnetjer ("The priest") is known from a Cairo ostracon.
- Ramesses-Userpehti ("Strong of strength") is probably a son of Ramesses II. He is mentioned on a Memphis statue and on a plaque.
- Seshnesuen[…] is mentioned on a Cairo ostracon.
- Sethemhir[…] is mentioned on a Cairo ostracon.
- Sethemnakht ("Set as the champion") is known from stone blocks from the Ramesseum, reused in Medinet Habu. Is also mentioned on a doorway.
- Shepsemiunu ("The noble one in Heliopolis") is known from stone blocks from the Ramesseum, reused in Medinet Habu.
- Wermaa[…] is mentioned on a Cairo ostracon.

== Daughters ==
It is harder to determine the birth order of the daughters than that of the sons. The first ten of them usually appear in the same order. Many of the princesses are known to us only from Abydos and from ostraca. The six eldest princesses have statues at the entrance of the Greater Abu Simbel temple.

1. Bintanath (“Daughter of Anath”), daughter of Isetnofret, later Great Royal Wife.
2. Baketmut (“Handmaid of Mut”)
3. Nefertari daughter of Nefertari, named after her. Possibly the wife of Amun-her-khepeshef.
4. Meritamen (“Beloved of Amun”) is Nefertari's daughter, later Great Royal Wife. She is probably the best known of Ramesses' daughters.
5. Nebettawy (“Lady of the Two Lands”) later became Great Royal Wife.
6. Isetnofret II (“The beautiful Isis”) is also known from a letter in which two singers inquire after her health. It is possible she was identical with Merenptah's wife Isetnofret, but it is also possible that Merenptah's wife was Khaemwaset's daughter, also called Isetnofret.
7. Henuttawy (“Mistress of the Two Lands”) was Nefertari's daughter.
8. Werenro
9. Nedjemmut (“Mut is Sweet”)
10. Pypuy is likely to be identical with a lady who was the daughter of Iwy and was reburied with a group of 18th dynasty princesses in Sheikh Abd el-Qurna.

From the Luxor procession of daughters:

11. Nebetiunet (“Lady of Denderah”)
12. Renpetnefer
13. Merytkhet (“Beloved of her body”)
14. Nebet[…]h[…]a
15. Mut-Tuya (“Mut is Admirable”), named after her paternal grandmother Tuya
16. Meritptah (“Beloved of Ptah”)

From the Abydos procession:

17. Unknown
18. Nubher[…]
19. Shehiryotes
20. Henut[…]
22. Merytmihapi (“Beloved like Hapi”)
23. Meritites (“Beloved by Her Father”)
24. Nubemiunu
25. Henutsekhemu (“Mistress of Powers”)
26. Henutpahuro[…]
31. Neferure (“Beauty of Ra”, daughter of Maathorneferure)
32. Merytnetjer (“Beloved of the God”)
17. […]khesbed (on the second Abydos procession)

From Wadi es-Sebua:

58. Henutpare[…]
59. Nebetnehat (“Lady is at the forefront”)

From a Louvre ostracon:

3. […]taweret
4. Henuttaneb (“Mistress of All Lands”)
5. Tuya (probably identical to Mut-Tuya)
6. Henuttadesh
7. Hetepenamun (“Peace of Amun”)
8. Nebetimmunedjem
9. Henuttamehu (“Lady of Lower Egypt”)
10. Nebetananash
11. Sitamun (“Daughter of Amun”)
12. Tia-Sitre (“Tia is the daughter of Ra”), named after her paternal great-grandmother Sitre
13. Tuya-Nebettawy (“Tuya is the lady of the Two Lands”)
14. Takhat (probably identical with the wife of Seti II)
15. Nubemweskhet

== See also ==
- Nineteenth Dynasty of Egypt family tree

== Sources ==
- Dodson, Aidan & Hilton, Dyan (2004). The Complete Royal Families of Ancient Egypt. Thames & Hudson. ISBN 9780500051283.
- Tyldesley, Joyce A. (2001). Ramesses: Egypt's Greatest Pharaoh. Penguin. ISBN 9780140280975.
