= Pareherwenemef =

Ancient Egyptian prince

- Prince of Egypt
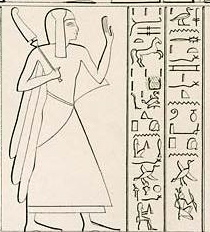
- Parehirwenemef in a procession of sons in Luxor.
- Burial: KV5, Thebes
Egyptian name
pA ra Z1 Hr Z1 R14 a f A51Re is with his right arm
- Dynasty: 19th dynasty
- Father: Ramesses II
- Mother: Nefertari

Pareherwenemef (Pre-hir-wonmef, Prehirwenemef, Rehirwenemef) was an ancient Egyptian prince of the Nineteenth Dynasty of Egypt, the third son of Pharaoh Ramesses II, the second by Queen Nefertari.

== Family ==
Pareherwenemef was a son of Pharaoh Ramesses II and Queen Nefertari. Prince Amunherkhepeshef is an older brother. Younger brothers include Meryre and Meryatum. The Princesses Henuttawy, Meritamen and Nebettawy were his sisters.

== Life ==
Pareherwenemef was present at the Battle of Kadesh and is depicted in the Abu Simbel temple. In the Kadesh inscriptions an incident is mentioned where two Hittite spies are captured. The interrogation reveals that the enemy is much closer than previously thought. The royal family quickly fled to the west, away from danger, led by Prince Pareherwenemef. The prince was called "First Brave of the Army" and later became "Superintendent of the Horse". Eventually Pareherwenemef became First Charioteer of His Majesty, a position he shared with his brother Mentuherkhepeshef.

Among the sons of Ramesses II, Pareherwenemef received the highest military honors. He held numerous titles, including “Great General of the Army,” “Leader of the King’s Army,” “First of the Braves,” “First Deputy of the Army,” “Overseer of Horses,” and “First Charioteer of His Person.”

Pareherwenemef is depicted on the facade of the small temple at Abu Simbel. He also appears on the palace facade in the Ramesseum. A statue base from Karnak mentions Pareherwenemef. On that same base a woman named Wadjyt-khati is mentioned but her exact relation to the prince is not known.

He predeceased his elder brother Amunherkhepeshef, and there is no evidence that he lived beyond the 20th year of Ramesses II’s reign. As a result, it's believed that Pareherwenemef was buried in KV5, a large rock-cut tomb built for the sons of Ramesses II in the Valley of the Kings. Shortly thereafter, Nefertari’s youngest son, Meryatum, assumed the title “Eldest King’s Son,” indicating that he had become the eldest living son of his mother. Meryatum is believed to have died during the 46th to 52nd year of Ramesses II’s reign, and based on records of the succession of the High Priest of Ra, his death likely occurred in the earlier part of this period.

== See also ==
- List of children of Ramesses II
