= Meryatum =

Ancient Egyptian prince and high priest of Ra

- High Priest of Ra in Heliopolis
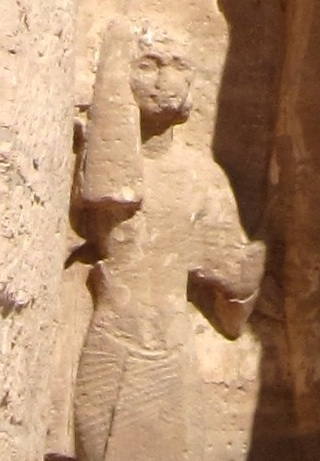
- Meryatum next to his father Ramesses II at the small temple at Abu Simbel.
Egyptian name
mr i i t tm
- Dynasty: 19th Dynasty
- Pharaoh: Ramesses II
- Burial: KV5
- Father: Ramesses II
- Mother: Nefertari

Meryatum (“Beloved of Atum”) was an ancient Egyptian prince and High Priest of Re, the son of Pharaoh Ramesses II and Queen Nefertari.

He is shown as 16th on the processions of princes, and is likely to have been the last child born to Ramesses and Nefertari (after Amun-her-khepeshef, Pareherwenemef, Meritamen, Henuttawy and Meryre). He is depicted in the Smaller Abu Simbel temple, dedicated to Nefertari. Inscriptions at Karnak and elsewhere show Nefertari was his mother.

He visited Sinai in the second decade of his father's reign. However, it is also possible that he was merely a newborn at the time, and the two officials included his name in their own monuments in celebration. In the later years, he was appointed as High Priest of Ra in Heliopolis, a position he held for the next twenty years.

The High Priest of Ra in Heliopolis was one of the three most prestigious priestly titles of the New Kingdom, ranked alongside the High Priest of Amun at Karnak and the High Priest of Ptah in Memphis. Its status was second only to the High Priest of Amun at Karnak and higher than that of the High Priest of Ptah in Memphis.

Two of his statues are now in Berlin and a stela belonging to him is in Hildesheim. An ostrakon mentions work on his tomb and that of Isetnofret, who is more likely a female descendant of Ramesses II than a queen, given the absence of a cartouche or royal titles; it implies he was buried in the area of the Valley of the Kings, though it is also possible he was buried in KV5, the tomb built for the sons of Ramesses, since a fragment of one of his canopic jars was found there.

Meryatum is referred to as the “King’s Eldest Son” in an inscription on a statue. This title is understood to denote the eldest living son born of the same mother, which indicates that all his full older brothers had died before him. He is believed to have died during the 46th to 52nd year of Ramesses II’s reign, and based on records of the succession of the High Priest of Ra, an earlier date of death is considered more likely.

== Inscriptions ==
Meryatum is known from several inscriptions.

- Inscription at Serabit el-Khadim depicting Prince Meryatum with the Troop-commander and Royal Cupbearer Ashahebsed and Troop-commander Amenemope.
- Façade of the Small Temple at Abu Simbel; two of the colossal statues of the King are flanked by small statues of the King’s Son Meryatum and the King’s Son Meryre (the other two are flanked by Amun-her-khepeshef and Prehirwenemef)
- Inscription at the Temple of Mut at Karnak; The inscription names Meryatum and Queen Nefertari: Text made by the King’s Son Ramesses-Meryatum, born of Queen Nefertari-Meryetmut, may she live forever! (Kitchen)
- Statue of Queen Nefertari with a depiction of Prince Meryatum at the left side (Brussels E.2459)
- Stela of Subordinate Akhpet from Qantir (Pelizaeus-Museum) mentions the King’s Son, Chief of Seers, pure of hands in the House of Re, Mery-Atum, justified.
- A statue with Standards (Berlin 19716) mentions on the Dorsal Pillar: Hereditary Prince and Count, Chief of Secrets in the Mansion of the Bennu bird, bodily King’s son, beloved of him, Chief of Seers, Mery-Atum. (Kitchen)
- The dorsal pillar of a statue in Berlin (Berlin 7347). On the left side the inscription reads: "[…in] the Great Mansion, Setem priest in the Horizon of Eternity, Eyes of the King at the head of his Two Lands, with the utterance of whose mouth people are pleased; King’s Son, Chief of Seers, pure of hands in the house of Re, Meryatum, renewed in life, born of the Great Royal Wife, Lady of Both Lands, Nefertari Meryetmut." (Kitchen) And on the right side it reads: "[…Chariot]eer of his father the Victorious King, Horus-Falcon, Beloved of Maat; King’s Son, Chief of Seers, pure of hands in the house of Re, Meryatum, born of the Great Royal Wife, Lady of Both Lands, Nefertari Meryetmut." (Kitchen) While the main text says: "Hereditary Prince, Royal princeling, Judge(?) of the people, born of the Great Royal Wife, Chief of Seers, pure of hands in the house of Re, Meryatum." (Kitchen)
- An ostracon in Cairo (JdE 72460) mentions “work-in-progress of the Chief of Seers, Meryatum”. Probably refers to work on the tomb of Meryatum (i.e. KV5)
- In the Valley of the Kings in KV5 two calcite canopic jars were found in chamber 3. One mentions Qebehsenuef, the other Hapi.

== See also ==
- List of children of Ramesses II
- Nineteenth Dynasty of Egypt family tree
