= Nebenkharu =

- Burial place: KV5, Thebes
- Relatives: Ramesses II (Father)
- Military career
- Allegiance: 19th Dynasty of Egypt (Ramesses II)
- Rank: Commander of the Troops

Nebenkharu was a son of Pharaoh Ramesses II and the sixth son in the procession of princes. The identity of his mother remains unknown, but he is probably not the son of one of his father's principal wives, Nefertari or Isetnofret.

== Life ==
Given his prominent rank among the princes, Nebenkharu most likely held the status of a firstborn son from a lesser wife and was born towards the end of his grandfather Seti I 's reign. He played an active role in significant events such as the victorious procession following the Battle of Kadesh in Year 5 and the Siege of Tunip in Year 8. Nebenkharu's prestigious position was further solidified by his title as Commander of the Troops.

== Death and burial ==
After Merneptah became Crown Prince following the death of Khaemwaset, it is likely that Nebenkharu died before him. This is because Mernptah was ranked lower than Nebenkharu in procession, and it is believed that he predeceased his father. As a result, Nebenkharu was likely buried in KV5, a large rock-cut tomb built for the sons of Ramesses II in the Valley of the Kings.
