= Siege of Dapur =

Siege in 1269 BC

- Part of Ramesses II campaigns in Syria
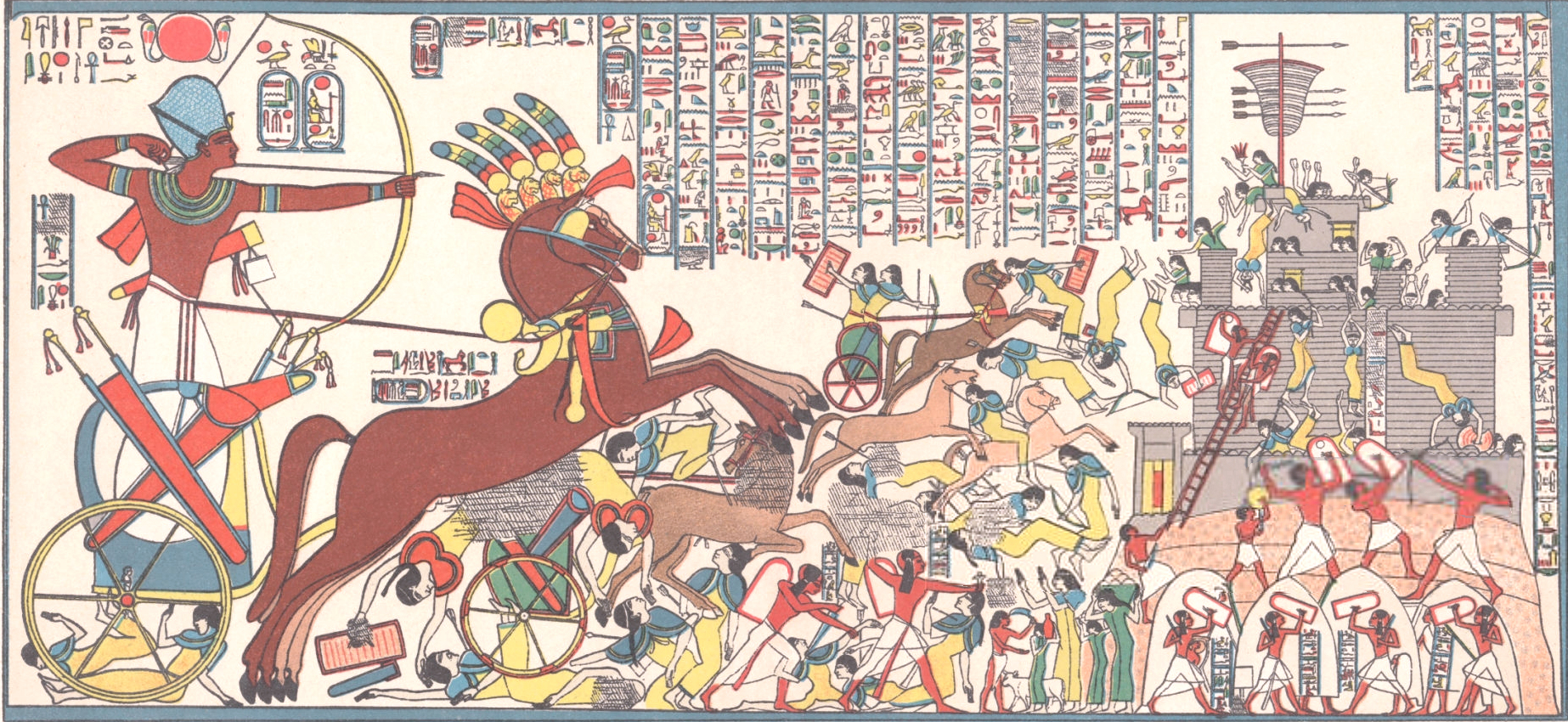
- The siege of Dapur on a mural in Ramesses II's temple in Thebes
Date	1269 BC
Location	Dapur, Hittite Empire (Syria region) 34°33′28.12″N 36°31′10.56″E
Result	Egyptian victory
Territorial changes	Egypt captures Dapur

Belligerents
New Kingdom of Egypt	Hittite Empire

Commanders and leaders
Pharaoh Ramesses II; Prince Khaemweset	Unknown

Strength
Unknown; Several archers and foot soldiers Several chariots Several siege ladders Several mantlets	Unknown (likely less than Egyptian strength)

Casualties and losses
Unknown (likely lower than Hittite losses)	Unknown

The siege of Dapur occurred as part of Pharaoh Ramesses II's campaign to suppress Galilee and conquer Syria in 1269 BC. He described his campaign on the wall of his mortuary temple, the Ramesseum in Thebes, Egypt. The inscriptions say that Dapur was "in the land of Hatti". Although Dapur has often been identified with Tabor in Canaan, Egyptologist Kenneth Kitchen argues that this identification is incorrect and that the Dapur in question was in Syria, north of Kadesh.

Egyptian reliefs depict Dapur as a heavily fortified settlement with both inner and outer walls and situated on a rocky hill, which was usual for Bronze Age settlements in Syria and abroad, Egypt was also fortified.

The city-state of Dapur held significant strategic importance as it was located along major trade routes connecting Mesopotamia, Anatolia, and Egypt. So, it was vital for the Egyptians to expand their control over the Levant and secure their borders against the Hittite Empire. To achieve this, the Egyptians launched a military campaign to capture Dapur and bring it under their control.

The Egyptian army, consisting of infantry, chariots, and auxiliary troops, marched northward from Egypt toward the city. Facing strong resistance, the army imposed a long and arduous siege. Ultimately, after a prolonged blockade, the Egyptian forces successfully breached the defenses of Dapur and captured the city. This victory further consolidated Egyptian control over the Levant and served as a major setback to Hittite influence in the region.

Contemporary illustrations of the siege show the use of ladders, chariots, and mounted cavalry with Egyptian soldiers climbing scale ladders supported by archers. Six of the sons of Ramesses, still wearing their sidelocks of youth, also appear on those depictions of the siege. Those include:

King's son, of his body, his beloved, Khaemweset.

King's son, of his body, his beloved, Montu.

King's son, of his body, his beloved, Meryamun.

King's son, of his body, his beloved, Amunemwia.

King's son, of his body, his beloved, Seti.

King's son, of his body, his beloved, Setepenre.

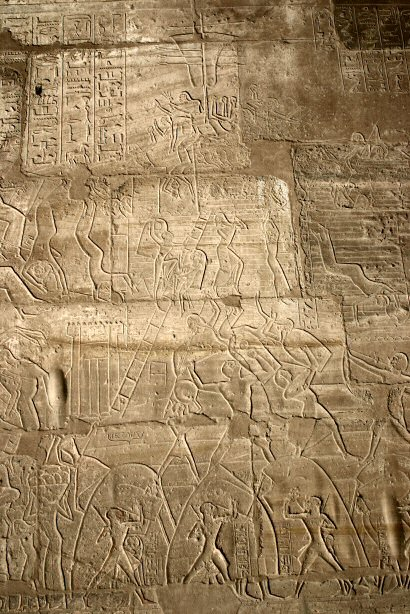
Relief from Ramesseum showing the siege of Dapur in 1269 BC
