= Mentuherkhepeshef =

mn n V13 D2 F24 f
Mentuherkhepeshef
in hieroglyphs
Era: New Kingdom
(1550–1069 BC)

Mentuherkhepeshef (mnṯ-ḥr-ḫpš=f; „Montu is with his strong arm”) is an ancient Egyptian name. It may refer to:

- Mentuherkhepeshef A, an ancient Egyptian prince of the 19th dynasty
- Mentuherkhepeshef (son of Ramesses III), an ancient Egyptian prince of the 20th dynasty
- Mentuherkhepeshef (son of Ramesses IX), an ancient Egyptian prince of the 20th dynasty
