= Ramesses-Meryamun-Nebweben =

Ancient Egyptian prince

Ramesses-Meryamun-Nebweben was an ancient Egyptian prince, a son of Pharaoh Ramesses II.

Since he is not shown or mentioned anywhere among the children of Ramesses, he is likely to have been one of the youngest of Ramesses' sons. He is known to us only from the inscriptions of his coffins. The identity of his mother is unknown. He spent his life in the Mer-wer harem (modern day Gurob), and was buried nearby after his death in his 30s.

His body was found, and it is apparent that he had a deformed spine and was hunchbacked. It is likely that because of his deformity it was difficult to find an adequate coffin for him. He was buried in an unused outer coffin of his great-grandfather, which Ramesses I had made when he was still a vizier named Paramessu (the name of Ramesses I before he became pharaoh). Thus, it's likely the coffin was possibly taken from Saqqara for reuse in Ramesses-Meryamun-Nebweben's burial. Although the inner coffin was also altered for Ramesses-Meryamun-Nebweben's burial, and the inscriptions were changed to his name instead of that of his great-grandfather, only the outer coffin was used, and the inner one was found by archeologists in a pit in Medinet Habu.

Unlike several of his brothers, whose name also includes the name Ramesses, in his name "Ramesses Meryamun" was enclosed in a cartouche, making it explicit that it is not used in its literal meaning ("Born of Rê, Beloved of Amun") but refers to the pharaoh. Nebweben means "lord of sunshine", the meaning of the prince's name is thus "Ramesses Meryamun is the Lord of Sunshine". Such names, glorifying the pharaoh, are often found as names taken by high officials, but are relatively rare as given names within the royal family during the New Kingdom.

== See also ==
- List of children of Ramesses II
- Nineteenth Dynasty of Egypt family tree
