= QV60 =

Tomb of Nebettawy

- Burial site of Nebettawy
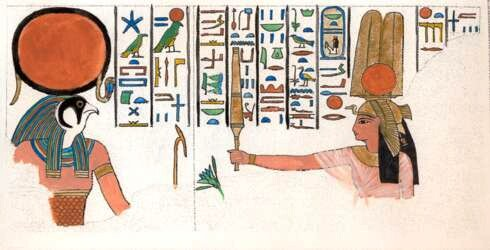
- Painting of Queen Nebettawy before the god Ra-Horakhty. Based on a Lepsius drawing. Abt. III, Band 6, Bl 172
- Location: Valley of the Queens
- Layout: A hall, a side chamber and a burial chamber
- ← Previous; QV59 Next → QV61

QV60 is the tomb of Nebettawy, the daughter and Great Wife of Ramesses II, in Egypt's Valley of the Queens. It was mentioned by Champollion and Lepsius, and later excavated by Ernesto Schiaparelli (the director of the Egyptian Museum in Turin).

Lepsius gives a short description of this tomb. In his list this is tomb number 6.

== The tomb ==
This tomb was transformed into a chapel during the Coptic period.

On the left wall of the first chamber 41 judges are depicted, each with a feather on their head. Nebettawy is shown offering a statue of Maat to a seated figure whose headdress is topped with two feathers. In the second chamber Nebettawy is shown before Horus and here she has the most elaborate titles: The Osiris, the King's Daughter, Great Royal Wife, Lady of the Two Lands, Mistress of Upper and Lower Egypt.

In one of the scenes Nebettawy wears a rather special headdress: a vulture crown with uraeus, topped by a modius and supporting a number of flowers. This specific headdress is only attested for Queen Nebettawy, Queen Isis (QV51 - time of Ramesses III-Ramesses IV) and Queen Tyti (QV52 – 20th dynasty). An earlier version of this crown was worn by Princess-Queen Sitamun, the daughter-wife of Amenhotep III.
