= Nebettawy =

- Queen consort of Egypt; Great Royal Wife; Lady of The Two Lands; Mistress of Upper and Lower Egypt, etc.
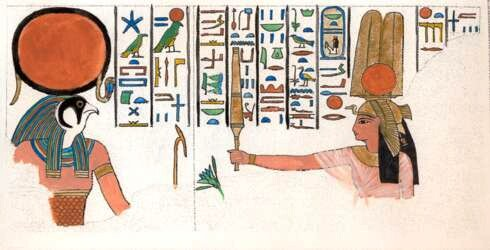
- Nebettawy before the God Re-Horakhty as depicted in her tomb
- Burial: QV60
- Spouse: Ramesses II
Egyptian name
nb t N17 N17 B1
- Dynasty: 19th Dynasty of Egypt
- Father: Ramesses II
- Mother: Nefertari?
- Religion: Ancient Egyptian religion

Nebettawy (nb.t-t3.wỉ; "Lady of the Two Lands") was an ancient Egyptian princess and queen, the fifth daughter and one of the eight Great Royal Wives of Pharaoh Ramesses II.

== Life ==
Nebettawy may have been the daughter of Ramesses' wife, Nefertari, but this is by no means certain. She is shown in the greater Abu Simbel temple. On the second southern colossus in front of the temple Nebettawy is depicted in the regalia of a queen. Nebettawy shown with a cap wig, a fairly simple modius and the double plumes. Bint-Anat (also dressed as a queen) stands by the left leg of the second southern colossus, Nebettawy by the right leg, and an anonymous princess stands in front of the colossus.

Nebettawy appears as the fifth princess in a parade of royal daughters as depicted in the great temple at Abu Simbel. She appears behind Bintanath, Baketmut, Nefertari ii, and Meritamen. The princesses are shown carrying a sistrum.

Nebettawy is not shown on the smaller temple of Abu Simbel. Nefertari is shown with Meritamen and Henuttawy on the facade of this temple.

Since all the evidence attesting to her status as queen is found within her tomb, it is impossible to determine precisely when Nebettawy became queen. The title of Great Royal Wife must have been conferred upon her posthumously. Given the severe lack of documentation, it is possible that she did not live into the final phase of Ramesses II's reign as did Bintanath, Meritamen, and Henutmire. These three princesses are attested until the 42nd to 56th years of Ramesses II's reign: Bintanath and Henutmire appear at the sides of Ramesses II's colossal statues, while Meritamen held an even more exalted position, being attested in colossi of equal scale to those of Ramesses II himself.

She held the titles Lady of the Two Lands (nb.t-t3.wỉ), Great Royal Wife (ḥm.t-nsw wr.t), Mistress of Upper and Lower Egypt (ḥnw.t šmˁw mḥw), King's Daughter (s3.t-nsw), King's Daughter of his body, his beloved (s3.t-nsw n.t ẖt=f mrỉỉ.t=f). Although the evidence is scarce, Nebettawy's position among the princess-queens was not insignificant. In the Papyrus de Turin (the content depicts a temple ritual invoking the royal ancestors), her rank was second only to the Great Royal Wife Nefertari and the Royal Wife Meritamen, but higher than that of the Royal Wife Bintanath. Apart from a princess-queen whose name is fragmentary and cannot be identified, no other queen of Ramesses II is included in this list.

== Death and burial ==
She was buried in the tomb QV60. The tomb was robbed already in antiquity and was later used as a Christian chapel. In one of the scenes in the tomb, Nebettawy wears a rather special headdress: a vulture crown with uraeus, topped by a modius and supporting a number of flowers. This specific headdress is only attested for Queen Nebettawy, Queen Iset Ta-Hemdjert (QV51), and Queen Tyti (QV52). It is not known what the precise meaning of this piece of regalia was. An earlier version of this crown was worn by Princess-Queen Sitamun, the daughter-wife of Amenhotep III. Hence it could be a reference to her position as Princess-Queen. However, this overly narrow interpretation has now been criticized, as this type of crown has been shown to be worn by various categories of women, and even before Nebettawy's time, it was not worn exclusively by Princess-Queens.

== See also ==
- List of children of Ramesses II
- Nineteenth Dynasty of Egypt family tree
