= Kent R. Weeks =

American egyptologist

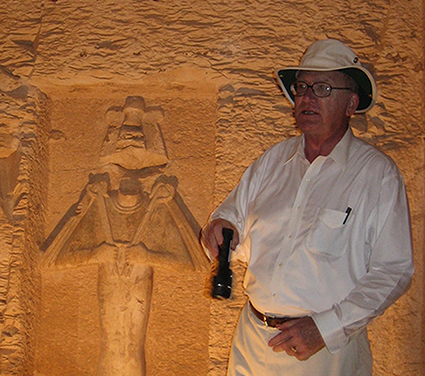
- Kent Weeks in KV5 2007
- Born: December 16, 1941 (age 84); Everett, Washington

Kent R. Weeks (born December 16, 1941) is an American Egyptologist.

== Biography ==
He was born in Everett, Washington, on December 16, 1941.

He remembers deciding to be an Egyptologist at the age of eight. Weeks attended R. A. Long High School in Longview, Washington, and graduated in 1959. He studied anthropology at University of Washington in Seattle, from where he obtained a master's degree. He visited Egypt for the first time in 1963 and was active in digs in Nubia associated with relocation work necessitated by the building of the Aswan Dam and the flooding of the Nile Valley to create Lake Nasser. In 1970 he earned a doctorate in Egyptology from Yale University

Weeks's professional career began with his appointment as professor of anthropology at American University in Cairo for the academic year 1971–72. Later he was appointed assistant curator of Egyptian art at the Metropolitan Museum of Art, then assistant professor at the University of Chicago and director of its institute in Luxor (Chicago House), then professor at the University of California, Berkeley, and in 1988 he became a professor of Egyptology at The American University in Cairo. His wife, Susan Weeks, was also an archaeologist and a gifted artist before her death in December 2009.

In 1978, Weeks devised and launched the Theban Mapping Project—an ambitious plan to photograph and map every temple and tomb in the Theban Necropolis. As part of this project, Weeks introduced hot air ballooning to the Luxor area with the intent of making inexpensive aerial surveys, which grew into an important part of the local tourist industry. However, a more important achievement of the Project was its 1995 discovery of the identity, and vast dimensions, of KV5, the tomb of the sons of Ramesses II in the Valley of the Kings.

In 1996, Weeks received the Golden Plate Award of the American Academy of Achievement.

On 12 December 2009, Susan Howe Weeks, Kent Weeks's wife of 43 years, died.

In 2011, Dr. Weeks founded the Theban Mapping Project (TMP) Library as a “public” or open library. It includes books in English and Arabic on Egyptology, archeological methodology, conservation, and management plans of sites around the world. It was originally located in a small house down a small lane.

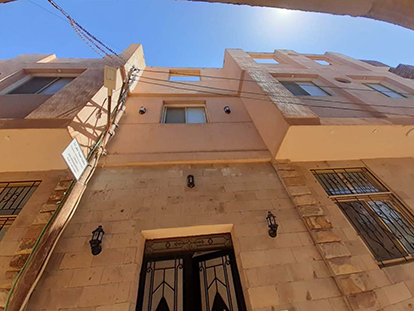
Front of TMP library and laboratory

In 2021, as a result of multiple donations, the library was relocated to a new multi-story building and more recently Dr. Weeks was able to establish a laboratory for archaeological preservation and study.

== Publications ==
- Atlas of the Valley of the Kings: The Theban Mapping Project
- The Illustrated Guide to Luxor and the Valley of the Kings
- The Valley of the Kings: The Tombs and the Funerary of Thebes West, (as editor)
- The Lost Tomb, London, 1998 (about KV5)
- KV 5, a preliminary Report on the Excavation of the Tomb of the Sons of Rameses II, American University in Cairo Press, 2000 (as editor)
