= QV75 =

Ancient Egyptian tomb

- Burial site of Henutmire
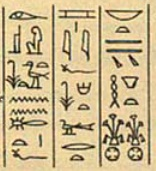
- Titles of the Princess-Queen from QV75. Lepsius tomb 1 in the Valley of the Queens

- Location within Egypt
- Location: Valley of the Queens
- Layout: A hall, a corridor and a burial chamber
- ← Previous; QV74 Tentopet Next → QV76 Merytre

QV75 is the tomb of Henutmire, likely the daughter (or sister) and Great Wife of Ramesses II, in Egypt's Valley of the Queens. It was mentioned by Champollion and Lepsius.

Lepsius gives a short description of this tomb. In his list this is tomb number 1. Both Lepsius and Porter and Moss list the tomb as belonging to an unknown Queen.

The tomb is closest to the mouth of the Valley and it may be one of the last tombs decorated during the reign of Ramesses II. The title King's Daughter is more prevalent than any other title. This may indicate that the tomb was originally intended for a royal princess, and adapted for Henutmire when she died.

== The tomb ==
The outer hall is decorated with several scenes showing deities. Two figures depicting Anubis are shown before a shrine. Henutmire is shown before a god in a kiosk, and other scenes show Horus.

In the corridor the queen is shown before Ra-Harakhti.

The inner hall shows the deceased adoring Ra-Harakhty as a hawk. The scene further includes baboons and the goddesses Isis and Nephtys adoring. There are depictions of furniture, including a lion-headed couch and a cow-headed couch. A mirror is shown by the first couch while an ointment jar is shown below the second couch.

The pillars in the inner room are decorated. The first pillar shows Horus-Inmutef, Hathor, Isis, and the souls of Pe kneeling. The second pillar is decorated with scenes showing Osiris, Maat, and Neith and the souls of Nekhen kneeling. The third pillar again shows Horus-Inmutef, the souls of Nekhen kneeling, Nephthys, and a Western goddess.

A trough of her coffin was usurped by Harsiese for his interment in Medinet Habu. Henutmire is named King's Daughter on the sarcophagus, and possibly King's Wife (the latter seems to be hard to read).

In the Salt papyrus the foreman Paneb is accused of going into the burial of Queen Henutmire and stealing a model of a goose, which was later found in his home.

The tomb appears to have been reused during the 22nd Dynasty. It was reused again during the Roman Period when an additional pit was dug into the floor of the sarcophagus chamber.
