= Meritamen =

Ancient Egyptian princess and queen

- Queen consort of Egypt; Great Royal Wife; Lady of The Two Lands; Mistress of Upper and Lower Egypt; King's Daughter, his beloved, etc
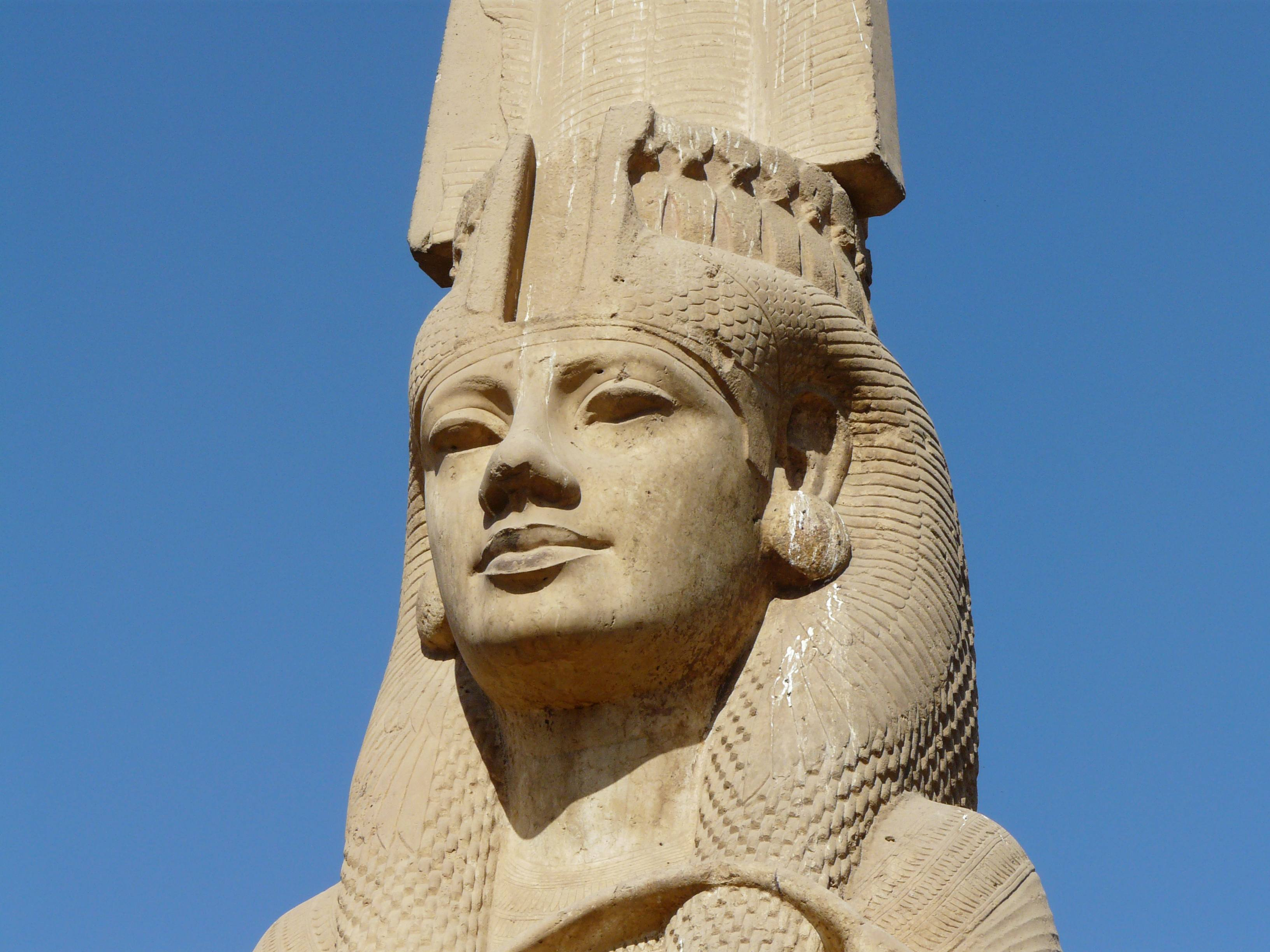
- Statue of Meritamen
- Born: c. 13th century BC
- Died: c. 13th century BC; Thebes?
- Burial: QV68, Valley of the Queens, Thebes
- Spouse: Ramesses II
- Dynasty: 19th of Egypt
- Father: Ramesses II
- Mother: Nefertari
- Religion: Ancient Egyptian religion

Meritamen in hieroglyphs
< i mn n mr i i t >
Meritamen
Mrjt Jmn
Beloved of Amun
- Daughter and Great Royal Wife of Pharaoh Ramesses II

Meritamen (also spelled Meritamon, Meritamun, Merytamen, Merytamun, Meryt-Amen; ancient Egyptian: Beloved of Amun) was a daughter and later Great Royal Wife of Pharaoh Ramesses the Great, born by his first queen Nefertari.

== Family ==
Meritamen was a daughter of Ramesses and his first Great Royal Wife, Nefertari. She appears as the fourth daughter in the list of daughters in Abu Simbel and had at least four brothers: Amun-her-khepeshef, Pareherwenemef, Meryre and Meryatum, as well as a sister named Henuttawy. Meritamen may have had more brothers and sisters, but these five are known from the facade of Queen Nefertari's temple in Abu Simbel.

Her eldest brother, Amun-her-khepeshef, was the crown prince until at least year 25 of the reign of their father. Prince Prehirwenemef is known to have served in the army and is depicted in the battle scenes from Kadesh. The youngest sibling known to us, Prince Meryatum, would later become High Priest of Re in Heliopolis.

Around the time her mother died (around the 23th regnal year), Meritamen became Royal Wife, along with her half-sister Bintanath. In the following years, she, along with her half-sister, was successively promoted to Great Royal Wife. Like Nefertari and Tuya, Meritamun’s funerary cult system was also associated with the mortuary temple of Ramesses II; somewhere in the temple she had a personal commemorative space established specifically for her, where offerings were made to this statue. Later, the White Queen statue was removed from its original location for preservation and placed in a building initially named the White Queen Chapel, which was subsequently renamed the Meritamen Chapel. However, this building was actually constructed during the reign of Akhenaten, leading some scholars to suggest that her statue was relocated to this site at an uncertain later date. Nevertheless, Meritamen was worshipped in some form within the Ramesseum, very likely in connection with her funerary cult.

== Depictions of Meritamen ==
Meritamen is depicted in quite a few scenes in temples and is represented on several statues.

- Meritamen is well known for her beautiful limestone statue, the White Queen found at the Ramesseum, the temple complex her father had built. In Kitchen's Ramesside inscriptions, the statue is attributed to Queen Tuya (mother of Ramesses II), but it is now generally thought to represent Princess-Queen Meritamen. The dorsal pillar contains the inscription: [...Chief of the Harem] of Amen-Re, Sistrum Player of Mut, Rattle-[player of Hathor ...], [...of Siut/Sai]s, danceuse of Horus, ... This statue originally depicted Meritamen standing barefoot, with her left leg forward, her right arm hanging by her side, and her left hand placed on her chest, wearing a double-plumed crown. The statue, including its base, stood about 2.25 meters tall, but only 0.75 meters of it remains today.
- Meritamen appears on multiple lists of royal daughters as the fourth daughter of Ramesses II. Her standard ranking places her after Bintanath, Baketmut, and Nefertari II, but before Nebettawy. However, in some lists of royal daughters, such as the one in the northeast corner of the Luxor Temple, she surpasses her expected position and is elevated to the second place in the sequence.
- Meritamen is mentioned in the Turin Papyrus, which relates to a temple ritual invoking the royal ancestors during the Ramesside period. Among the queens of Ramesses II, her name is listed second, after her mother Nefertari and before her sisters Nebettawy, Bintanath, and a princess-queen whose name is partially damaged.
- In the temple of Ramesses II in El Kab, there is a depiction of an Iunmutef priest and the Princesses Bint-Anath and Meryetamen. Scene includes cartouches and the princesses carry wands. Bintanat is termed "king's daughter" as well as "king's wife", while Meryetamen's titles are completely lost and have not been preserved. However, her position is arranged before that of Bint-Anath, which indicates that her status was regarded as higher than Bint-Anath’s. Both Merytamen and Bint-Anath have a modius without stalks, shake a sistrum, and carry a gazelle-headed wand. They face Iunmutef ("pillar of his mother"), a solar deity often associated with the crown prince.
- In the small temple of the Ramesseum, which was dedicated to Queen Nefertari and the King's Mother Tuya, the importance of Meritamen is highlighted. She left a dedicatory inscription there in her own name; originally quite long, only a fragment now remains: "[...] the great royal wife Meritamen, alive (ꜥnḫ.tỉ), stable (ḏd.tỉ), prosperous (wꜣs.tỉ), joyful (šw.tỉ-bꜥtỉ), healthy (šnb.tỉ) [...]".
- At Deir el-Medina, Meryetamen is attested with the title of “Great Royal Wife” on a stela showing her shaking sistrums before Ahmose-Nefertari and her son Amenhotep I, the deified rulers and protectors of the Theban necropolis.
- At Deir el-Medina, Meryetamen is attested with the title of “Great Royal Wife” on a stela showing her shaking sistrums before Ahmose-Nefertari and her son Amenhotep I, the deified rulers and protectors of the Theban necropolis.
- She appears on the facade of the great temple of Abu Simbel. The northernmost colossus shows the Bodily King's Daughter, his beloved, Merytamen. Meritamen is accompanied by Princess Nefertari (Bodily King's Daughter), and Queen-Mother and God's Wife, Mut-Tuya.
- The small temple of Abu Simbel dedicated to Queen Nefertari and the goddess Hathor is decorated with 2 large statues of Queen Nefertari and 4 large statues of Ramesses II. The statues of Nefertari are flanked by two daughters: the Princesses Meritamen and Hennutawy.
- The Abu Simbel Rock stela of Viceroy of Nubia Heqanakht. The upper register shows Ramesses II and Princess Merytamen worshipping Deities. The lower register depicts the Viceroy adoring Queen Nefertari before offerings. Nefertari holds the ankh symbol, positioned on par with the three deities in the upper register of the stela, and in the same register, a deified Ramesses II is depicted in a similar posture. This indicates that Nefertari appears here in the capacity of a goddess, being venerated as a deity within the temple. It was Meritamen, not Nefertari, who participated in the ritual worship of the gods (including the deified Ramesses II). This suggests that Nefertari had already died by this time. The stela was previously thought to represent the inauguration ceremony of the Abu Simbel temple, but this theory has now been refuted.
- In Luxor, Meritamen is depicted twice on statues of her father/husband. The westernmost colossus before the pylon shows Meritamen next to her father. She is given the titles of King's Daughter and Great Royal Wife. She is also depicted on statuary in the forecourt. On the southern colonnade, eastern statue Meritamen is the queen depicted on the left.
- In Karnak, Meritamen is depicted as “King’s Daughter and Royal Wife” on the left side of the northern colossus positioned in front of the Second Pylon.
- The bust of the princess-queen, now housed in the Nubian Museum in Aswan, has been identified as belonging to Meritamen. This bust originally belonged to a colossal statue of Ramesses II unearthed at the Wadi es-Sebua site. The statue has since collapsed, with Meritamen and her sister Bintanath originally depicted on the left and right sides of the statue's feet, respectively.
- Statue in Tanis (from Pi-Ramesse), which attests to the Great Royal Wife Maathorneferure: Meritamen is depicted standing between the legs of her father. She reaches to about knee height, and designated as “King’s Daughter and Royal Wife.”
- A colossus from Pi-Ramesses, now in the central area of Tanis, also associates the princesses and queens Bint-Anath and Meritamen with the title of “Royal Wife.”
- Large statue of the Queen at the Temple of Min at Akhmim, likely to originally have been carved for Tey, the wife of Ay, in the 18th Dynasty. This colossus was discovered alongside Ramesses II’s own statue; This original ensemble may have been arranged during the fifth or sixth decade of the reign, as the inscription on the base of the king’s statue was used approximately between Year 42 and Year 56. On the dorsal pillar, the Queen is identified as "... whose forehead is beautiful bearing the uraeus, the beloved of her Lord, the great one [of the harem of Amen]-Re, [sistrum player] of Mut, menat player of Hathor, songstress of Atum, King's Daughter [beloved of ?] .. [Mr]it[I]mn.w." "the fair of face, beautiful in the palace, the Beloved of the Lord of the Two Lands, she who is beside her Lord as Sothis is beside Orion, one is pleased with what is spoken when she opens her mouth to pacify the Lord of the Two Lands, King's Daughter in the palace [?] of the Lord of many festivals [?] ... The inscription on the right side of the base reads: “the King’s Daughter of his body, his beloved, the Great Royal Wife,” followed by the beginning of a now-lost cartouche. On the back, a double inscription remains to be restored as: “beloved of [Isis] who resides at Ipou (Akhmim).”
- Colossal statue of Ramesses II from Akhmim. The king is accompanied by two daughter-Queens. The Princess-Queen by left leg is identified as Daughter of the King, his beloved, Great King's Wife, Merytamen, may she be young. The Princess-Queen by right leg is identified as Daughter of the King, his beloved, Great King's Wife, Bint-Anath, may she live.
- In Heracleopolis, an usurped Middle Kingdom statue was found with Bint-Anath and Meryetamen depicted on the base of the statue.
- A colossal statue of a pharaoh, now only preserved as its base and currently housed in London(EA 1662)EA1662 The British Museum, bears a long inscription on the base: "Hereditary Princess, ruling the Harim, greatly favored, Mistress of South and North, who fills the columned hall with the scent of her perfume, King's Daughter, Great Royal Wife, Lady of Both Lands, Merytamen, may she live.""Hereditary Princess, ruling the Harim, greatly favored, Mistress of South and North, Lady of the Rattle and Mistress of the Sistrum, Prophetess of Hathor, King's Daughter, Princess-child of Horus, Great Royal Wife, Lady of Both Lands, Merytamen, may she live."
- In 2001, a joint archaeological team from the Supreme Council of Antiquities and the University of Potsdam in Germany discovered a colossal statue of Meryetamen. This massive granite statue weighs 80 tons and stands nine meters high. Although it was originally constructed during the reign of Ramesses II, it was later re-inscribed during the Twenty-Second Dynasty by King Osorkon II as a dedication to his wife Karomama, with both of their names visible on the back of the statue.
- A damaged wine receipt from Deir el-Medina mentions ‘the estate of the King’s Daughter and King’s Wife, Merytamon,’ no doubt in connection with her vineyard.

== Titles ==
- Hereditary Princess, the great first one (iryt-p`t-tpit-wrt)
- ruling the Harim
- the great one of the harem of Amen-Re
- greatly favored/Great of Praises(wrt-hzwt)
- who fills the columned hall with the scent of her perfume
- Mistress of Upper and Lower Egypt (hnwt-Shm’w -mhw)
- King’s Daughter (s3t-niswt), var.: King's Daughter in the palace [?] of the Lord of many festivals [?]
- Great King’s Wife (hmt-niswt-wrt)
- Lady of The Two Lands (nbt-t3wy)
- whose forehead is beautiful bearing the uraeus
- the beloved of her Lord, var.: the Beloved of the Lord of the Two Lands
- Lady of the Rattle and Mistress of the Sistrum
- Prophetess of Hathor
- Princess-child of Horus
- [Sistrum player] of Mut
- Chantress of Mut
- Menit player of Hathor
- Songstress of Atum
- The fair of face beautiful in the palace, she who is beside her Lord as Sothis is beside Orion, one is pleased with what is spoken when she opens her mouth to pacify the Lord of the Two Lands

== Burial in the Queens Valley ==
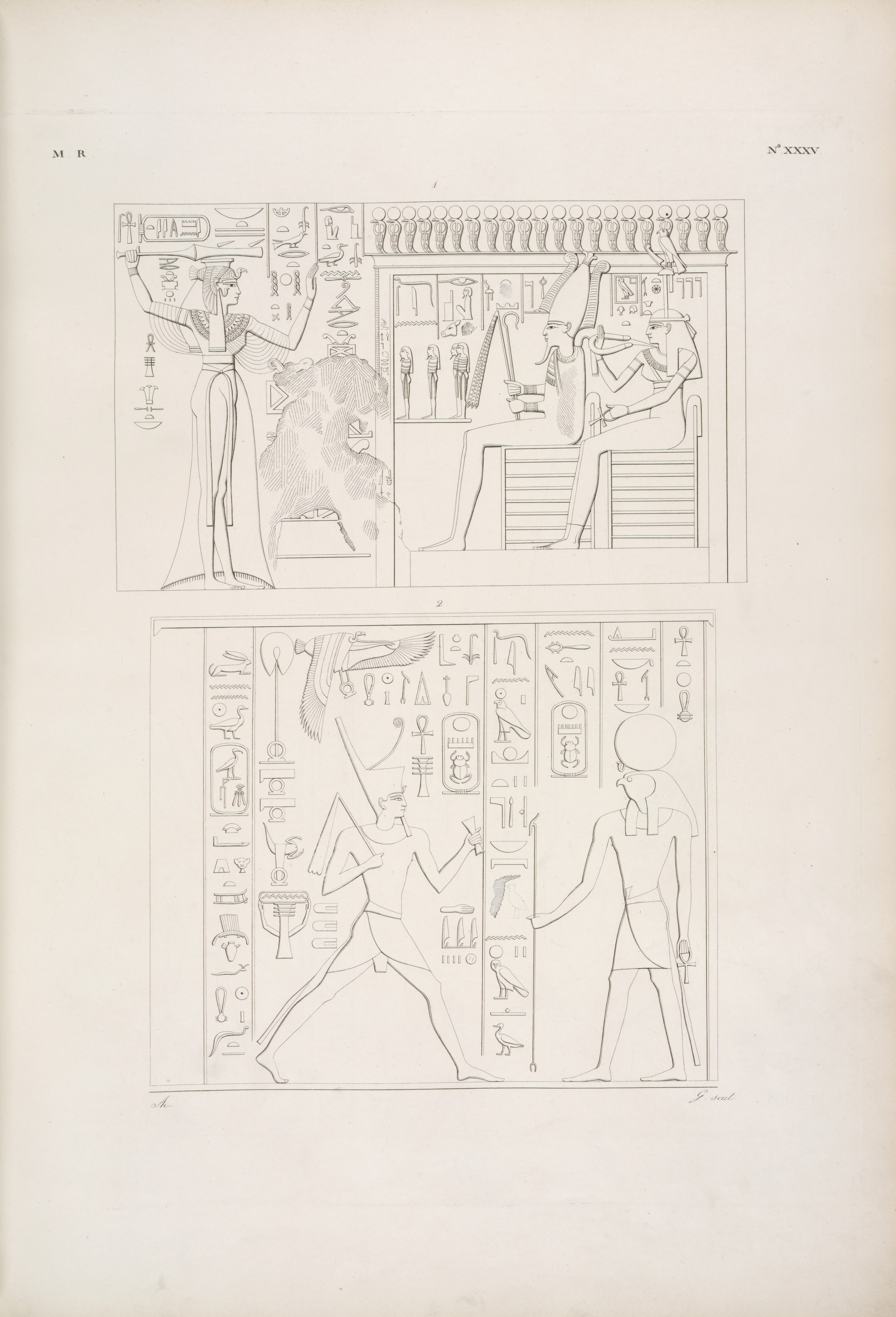
Queen Meritamen raises the ḥrp-scepter high above her head with her back arm (as shown in the image above).

The exact time of Meritamen's death remains uncertain, but it could not have been earlier than the 50th year of Ramesses II’s reign. There is no reason to assume that the promotion of younger princess‑queens coincided with the retirement or death of older ones. Records of Meritamen, Bintanath, and Henutmire during the reign of Ramesses II can be traced as late as between the 42nd and 56th years. They likely all outlived their father‑husband. Meritamen’s tomb later received an additional small chamber, which was left unfinished, suggesting that she underwent a change in status shortly before her death. She probably died in the early part of Merneptah’s reign, while Henutmire lived on into the reign of Amenmesse.

Meritamen was buried at QV68 in the Valley of the Queens. The tomb of Meritamen was described by Lepsius. An interesting scene in the tomb shows Meritamen consecrating cloth-boxes to Osiris and Hathor. The inscriptions identify the Queen as The Osiris, King's Daughter, Great Royal Wife, Lady of Both Lands, Merytamen, may she live. She is said to be "Bringing a box of clothing, eternally; consecrating the box of clothing three times" (sic).

Here, Meritamen assumes a strikingly dynamic pose, raising the ḥrp-scepter high above her head with her back arm. The image resembles the typical stance of the Canaanite goddess Anat—Meritamen lifts the scepter above her head just as Anat would hold an axe. There is no comparable example in any of the queenly tombs of the 18th or 19th Dynasties, making this pose truly unique. This may be because Anat was a goddess especially revered by Ramesses II, and it could also reflect Meritamen’s personal devotion.

The sarcophagus-lid is now in Berlin (15274). Meritamen's titles on the sarcophagus lid are given twice. At the head she is described as: "[King's Daughter], Great [Royal Wife], Lady of Both Lands, Merytamen, justified". Over the head she is described as: "The Osiris, King's Daughter beloved of him, Great Royal Wife, Lady of Both Lands, Merytamen, justified".

== Gallery ==
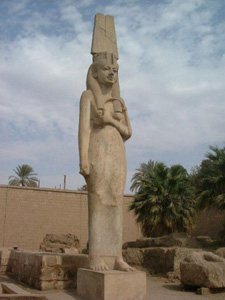
Statue of Meritamen at Akhmim

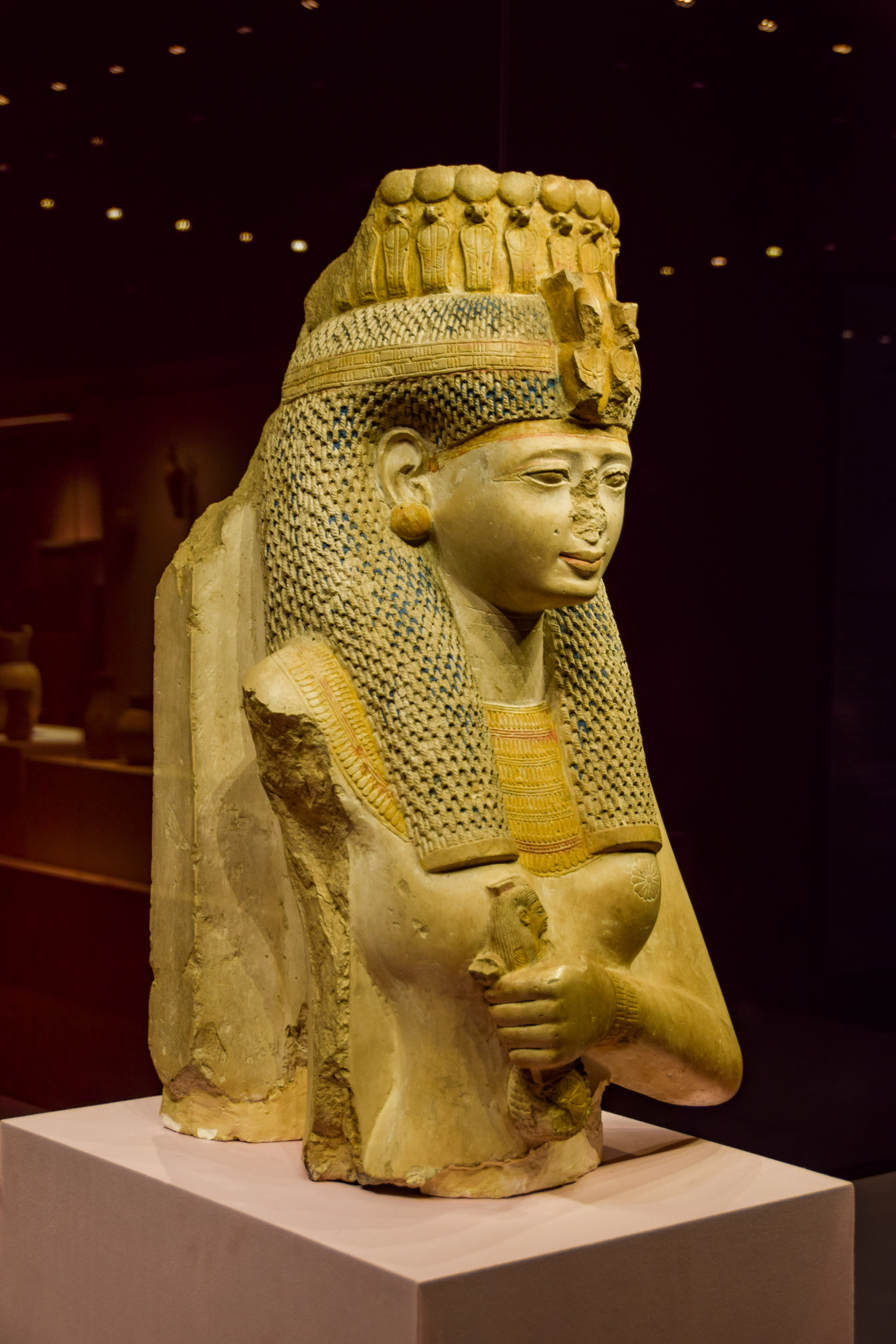
The White Queen statue at the Hurghada Museum

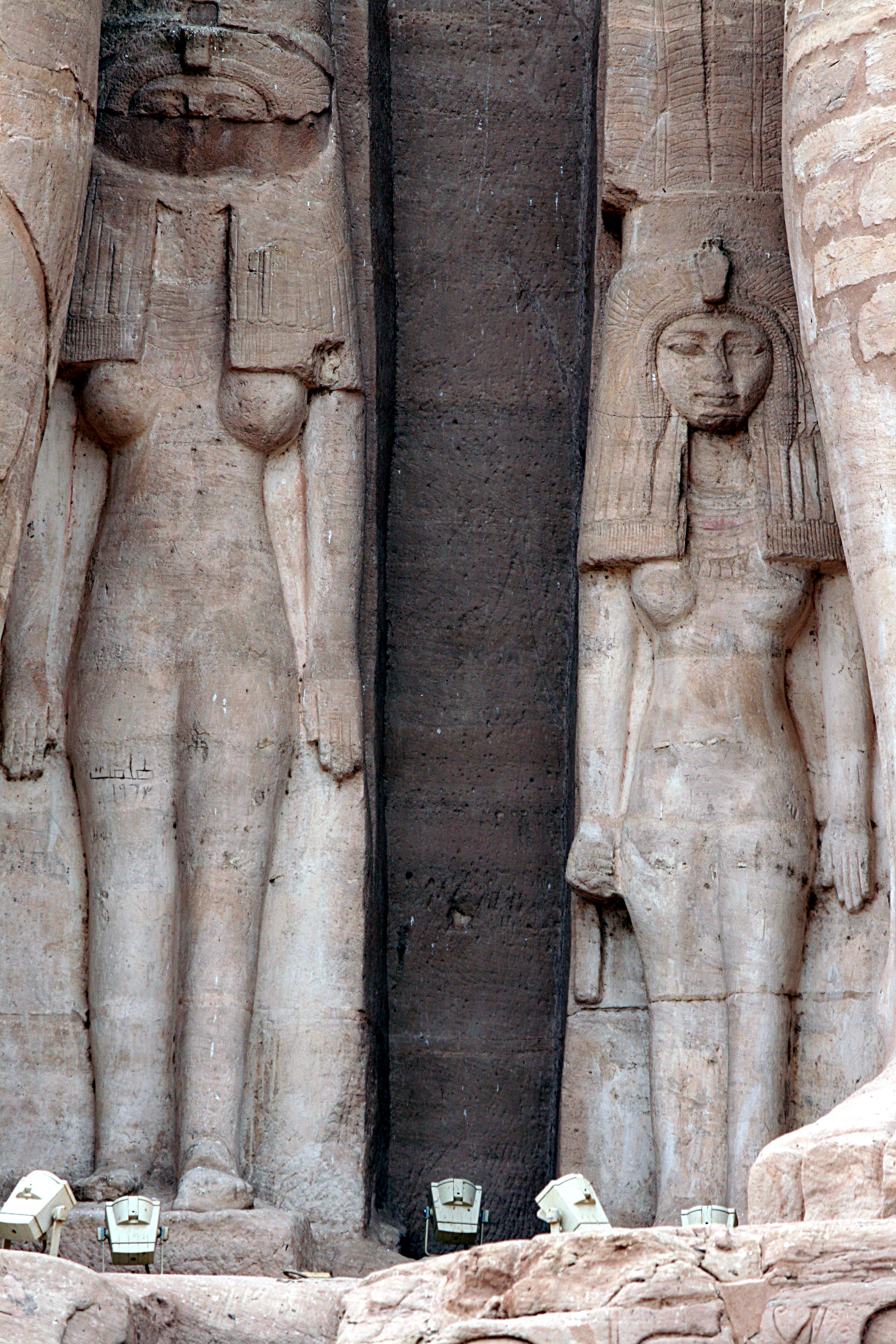
Statues of Queen Meritamen (right) and her sister Baketmut (left)

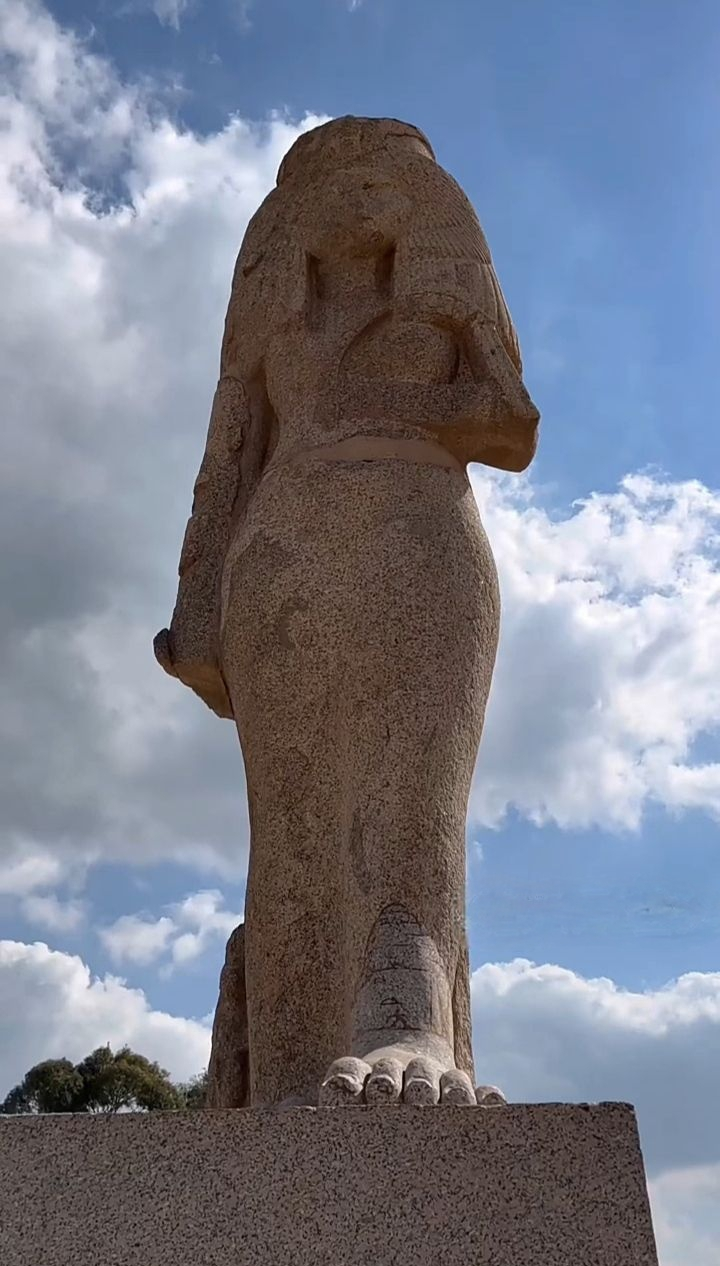
Meritamen statue at Zagazig

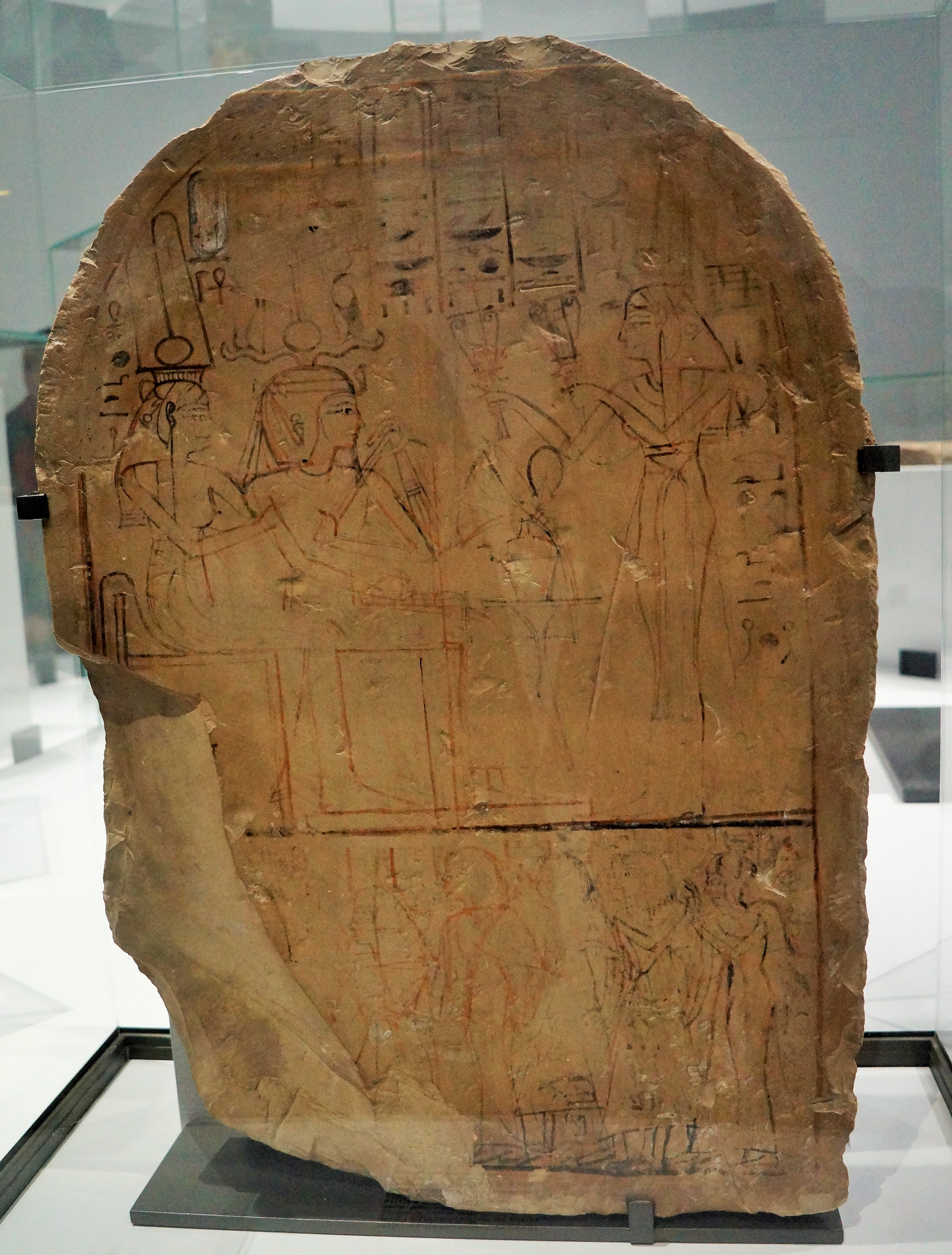
Stela of Meritamen standing before the deified Amenhotep I and his mother Ahmose-Nefertari

== See also ==
- List of children of Ramesses II
