= QV68 =

Ancient Egyptian tomb in the Valley of the Queens

- Burial site of Meritamen
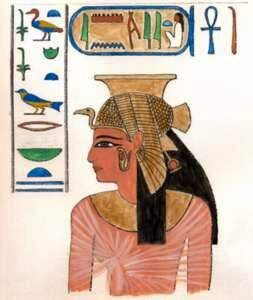
- Painting of Meritamen, based on line drawing by Lepsius of scene in QV 68
- Location: Valley of the Queens
- Layout: A hall, a side chamber and a burial chamber
- ← Previous; QV67 Next → QV69

QV68 is the tomb of Meritamen, the daughter and Great Wife of Ramesses II, in Egypt's Valley of the Queens. It was mentioned by Champollion and Lepsius, and later excavated by Ernesto Schiaparelli (the director of the Egyptian Museum in Turin).

Lepsius gives a short description of this tomb. In his list this is tomb number 12.

== Tomb ==
The main hall contains several scenes with deities. Meritamen appears before Neith, Thoth, Ra-Harakhti and Hathor. Meritamen is shown consecrating Mehet boxes before Osiris and Hathor, who are seated in a kiosk. The inscriptions identify the Queen as The Osiris, King's Daughter, Great Royal Wife, Lady of Both Lands, Merytamen, may she live. She is said to be "Bringing a box of clothing, eternally; consecrating the box of clothing three times" (sic).

Further scenes show the deceased offering to Khnum, and offering two vases to Ptah.

Meritamen was buried in a red granite sarcophagus which is now in the Berlin Museum (15274). The inscriptions identify her as The [King's Daughter], Great [Royal Wife], Lady of Both Lands, Merytamen, justified, and as The Osiris, King's Daughter beloved of him, Great Royal Wife, Lady of Both Lands, Merytamen, justified.
