= Baketmut =

Ancient Egyptian princess

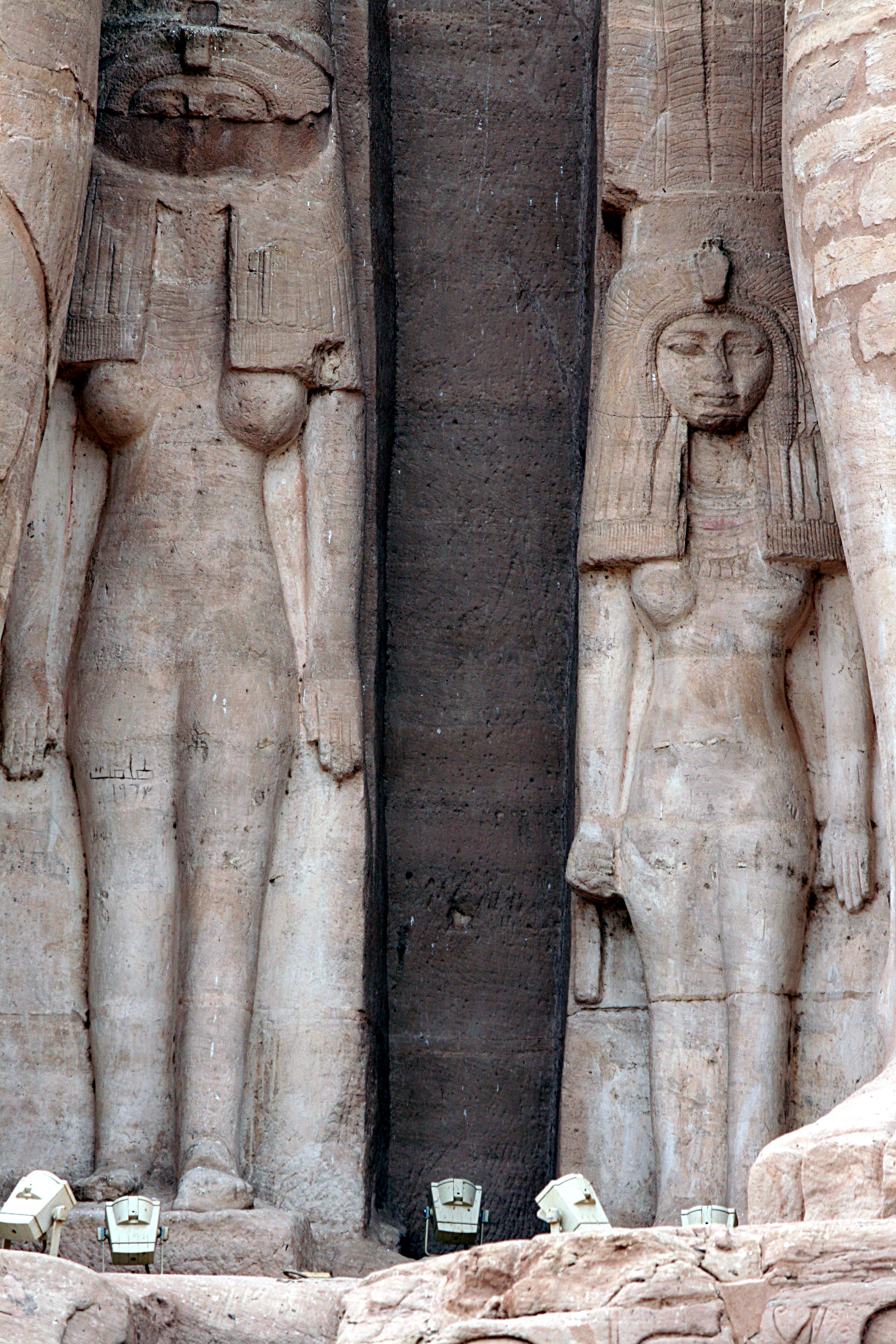
- Baketmut (left) and her sister Meritamen in Abu Simbel
Egyptian name
G15 G29 X1 B1
- Dynasty: Nineteenth Dynasty
- Father: Ramesses II

Baketmut (Ancient Egyptian: b3k.t-mwt, "Handmaid of Mut") was an ancient Egyptian princess of the Nineteenth Dynasty. She was the second daughter of Pharaoh Ramesses II.

Her statue stands at the feet of one of her father's colossi at the Great Temple of Abu Simbel. She is depicted as an adult, with an uraeus on her head. She is also depicted inside the temple, in a procession of the nine eldest daughters of the pharaoh, where she is the second in line, behind Bintanath. It has been proposed that her mother was Queen Nefertari, but she is nowhere named as such. She is not shown on the facade of the Small Temple of Abu Simbel, which was built for Nefertari and decorated with statues of princes and princesses who are likely to have been her children.

Her tomb is not known.

== See also ==
- List of children of Ramesses II
