= Nineteenth Dynasty of Egypt family tree =

Family tree of ancient Egyptian rulers

The family tree of the Egyptian 19th Dynasty is the usual mixture of conjecture and interpretation. The family history starts with the appointment of Ramesses I as the successor to Horemheb, the last king of the 18th Dynasty who had no heirs. From Rameses' line came perhaps the greatest king of the New Kingdom of Egypt, Rameses II. He ruled for nearly 67 years and had many children (see List of children of Ramesses II).

Following Ramesses II's death, his granddaughter declined the throne and the succession remains unclear. The parentage of Pharaoh Amenmesse and his exact relation to Siptah is unknown.

Commander Seti
Ramesses I	Sitre
Hattusili III	Puduhepa
Seti I	Tuya
Isetnofret	Ramesses II	Nefertari	Maathorneferure
Amun-her-khepsef	Meritamen
Ramesses	Bintanath	Khaemweset	Isetnofret II	Merneptah	Takhat
Seti II	Twosret	Amenmesse
Siptah

== Bibliography ==
- Aidan Dodson & Dyan Hilton (2004). The Complete Royal Families of Ancient Egypt. London: Thames & Hudson.
