= Mentuherkhepeshef A =

Son of Pharaoh Ramesses II

Mentuherkhepeshef
- "First Charioteer of His Majesty" "Overseer of the horses" "Royal scribe"
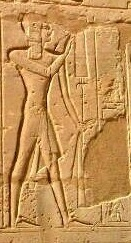
- Mentuherkhepeshef depicted in the procession of sons at the Ramesseum.
Egyptian name
mn n V13 D2 F24 f
- Dynasty: 19th Dynasty
- Pharaoh: Ramesses II
- Burial: KV5, Thebes
- Father: Ramesses II
- Mother: Unknown (Most likely a minor wife of Ramses II)

Mentuherkhepeshef (ancient Egyptian: mntw-ḥr-hpšf, "Montu is with his Strong Arm") was a son of Pharaoh Ramesses II and the fifth son in the procession of princes after his half-brothers; Amunherkhepeshef, Ramesses, Pareherwenemef, and Khaemwaset.

== Biography ==
Mentuherkhepeshef participated in the Battle of Kadesh in Year 5 and the Siege of Dapur in Year 10, One mention of Mentuherkhepeshef can be found on a stela from Bubastis, an ancient city located in the eastern Nile Delta region of Egypt. Additionally there is a statue of Mentuherkhepeshef that currently resides in Copenhagen, Denmark. Mentuherkhepeshef is referred to as Mentuherwenemef in an inscription found in Luxor temple, possibly indicating different titles or roles he held during his lifetime. He shared the titles First Charioteer of His Majesty and overseer of the horses with his half-brother Pareherwenemef.
