= Henutmire =

- Queen consort of Egypt; Great Royal Wife; Lady of The Two Lands; Mistress of Upper and Lower Egypt, etc
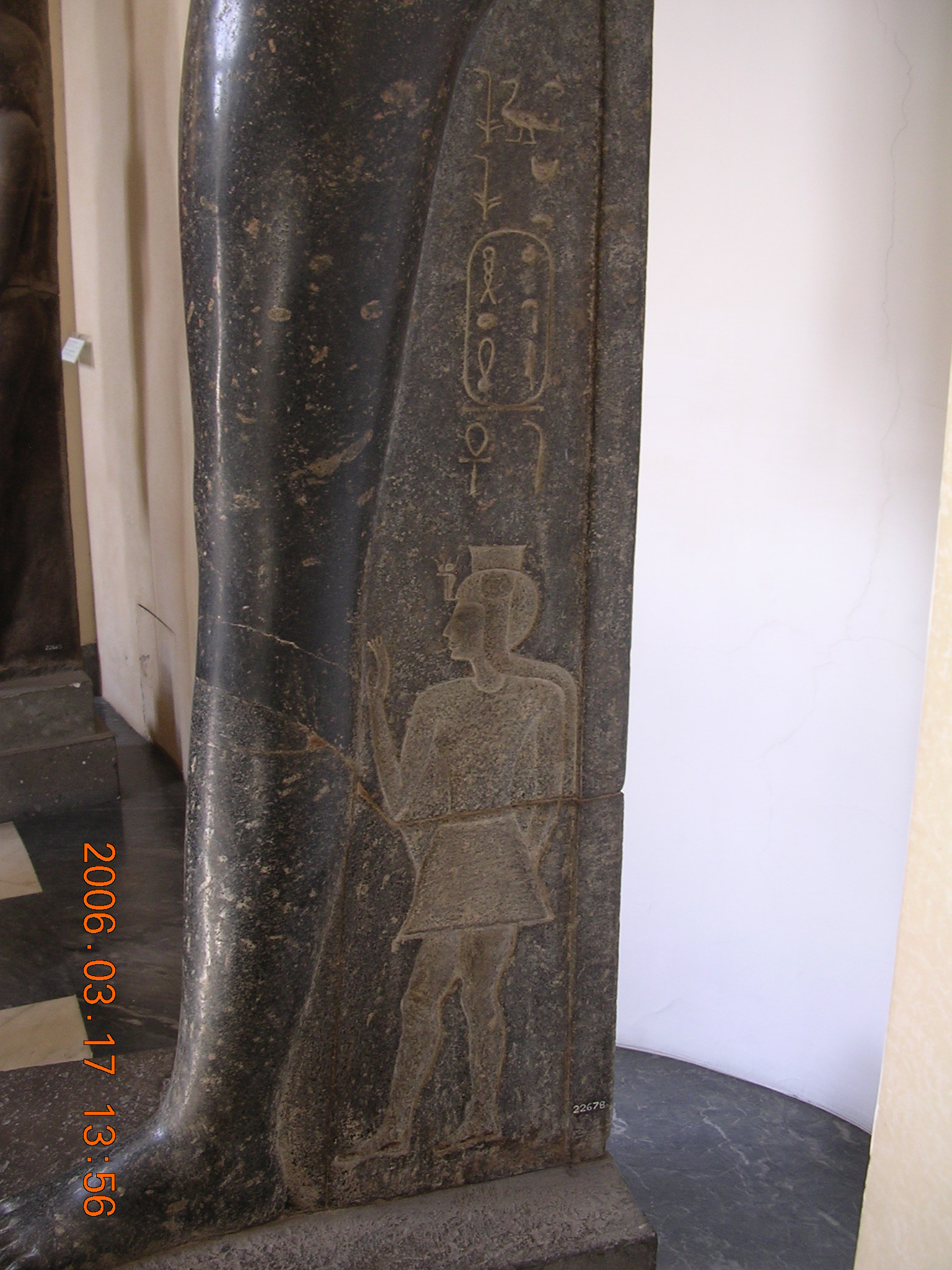
- Henutmire on a statue of Queen Tuya. The lower part of the small figure of Henutmira underwent a restoration in the 17th or 18th century which mistakenly attributed it a male kilt.
- Burial: QV75
- Spouse: Ramesses II
Egyptian name
Two variations:
N5 V28 W24 t W10 W19 i
V28 W24 t W10 N5 W19 i R8
- Dynasty: 19th Dynasty of Egypt
- Religion: Ancient Egyptian religion

Henutmire was an ancient Egyptian princess and queen. She was one of the eight Great Royal Wives of Pharaoh Ramesses II of the 19th Dynasty of Egypt.

== Life ==
She is supposedly the third and youngest child of Seti I and Tuya, and the younger sister of Ramesses II and Tia. This theory is based on a statue of Queen Tuya, now in the Vatican. The statue shows Tuya with Henutmire, thus it is assumed that they were mother and daughter. However, this inference is not necessarily valid. A pair of crotales from the Amarna period links Tiye with Meritaten, bearing only the inscription: "Great Royal Wife, Tiye, may she live, King’s daughter, Meritaten." Tiye was Meritaten’s grandmother, not her mother. She is also nowhere mentioned as "King's Sister", a title which Princess Tia used, thus it cannot be concluded solely from Tuya's statues that she was Ramesses' sister.

On a statue of Ramesses II, Henutmire is granted the title "the King’s Daughter of his body, his beloved, the Great Royal Wife". This title confirms that Henutmire was indeed Ramesses II’s daughter, not his sister, and that she died during the reign of Amenmesse. One of the crimes committed by a criminal in that period was the theft of a goose at her funeral. Her lifespan further supports the conclusion that she was Ramesses II’s daughter.

Her name means "The lady is like Rê". She married Ramesses II and became Great Royal Wife; if she was his daughter, she was the fourth to do so, after Bintanath, Meritamen and Nebettawy. She is shown on statues of Ramesses from Abukir and Heliopolis. On a colossus from Hermopolis she is depicted together with Princess-Queen Bintanath. Both have the titles The Hereditary Princess, richly favoured, Mistress of the South and the North, King's Daughter, Great Royal Wife.

== Death and burial ==
She died during the reign of Amenmesse, and was buried in the tomb QV75. Her tomb was robbed already in antiquity; the trough of her coffin was later used for the burial of priest-king Harsiese in Medinet Habu. It is now in the Egyptian Museum in Cairo.
