= Nefertari =

Wife of the Egyptian pharaoh Ramesses II

- Great Royal Wife; Lady of The Two Lands; Mistress of Upper and Lower Egypt
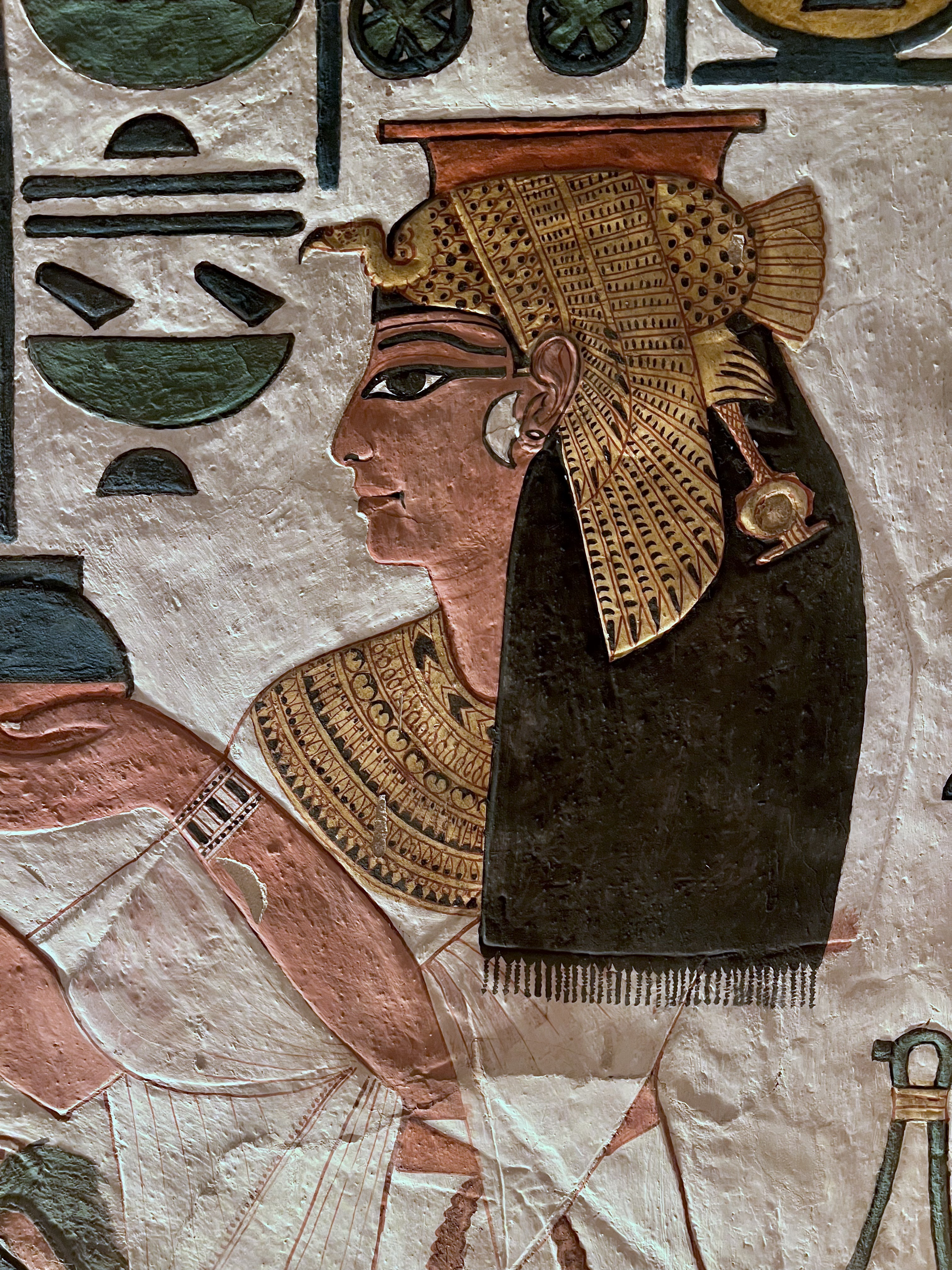
- Tomb wall depicting Queen Nefertari, the great royal wife of Pharaoh Rameses II
- Died: c. 1255 BC
- Burial: QV66, Valley of the Queens, Thebes
- Spouse: Ramesses II
- Issue: Amun-her-khepeshef; Pareherwenemef; Meryatum; Meryre; Meritamen; Henuttawy; Baketmut (possibly); Nefertari (possibly); Nebettawy (possibly)
Names
- Nefertari Meritmut
- Dynasty: 19th of Egypt
- Religion: Ancient Egyptian religion

Nefertari-Meritmut in hieroglyphs
t G15 nfr i t r Z1 Z1 n N36 t
Nefertari Meritmut
Nfrt jrj mrjt n Mwt
The most beautiful (one) among them,
beloved of Mut
- Great Royal Wife of Pharaoh Ramesses II

Nefertari (also known as Nefertari Meritmut; Akkadian: Naptera) was an Egyptian queen and the first of the Great Royal Wives (or principal wives) of Ramesses the Great. She is one of the best known Egyptian queens, among such women as Cleopatra, Nefertiti, and Hatshepsut, and one of the most prominent Egyptian royal consorts. She was highly educated and able to both read and write hieroglyphs, a very rare skill at the time. She used these skills in her diplomatic work, corresponding with other prominent royals of the time. Her lavishly decorated tomb, QV66, is one of the largest and most spectacular in the Valley of the Queens. Ramesses also constructed a temple for her at Abu Simbel next to his colossal monument there.

== Translation of name ==
There are different interpretations of the meaning of the name Nefertari. Nefertari means 'beautiful companion' and Meritmut means 'Beloved of the goddess Mut'. Based on the study of analogous personal names and onomastics, the name Nefertari cannot mean "beautiful companion." This is because nfrt here is a noun, associated here with the goddess Hathor, and jrj here is not a noun. "Beautiful companion" is actually its playful variant jrj.t-nfr.t. Some sources consider a more accurate translation for Nefertari as "the most beautiful one", "the most beautiful of them", "the most beautiful one of them all" "the most beautiful (one) among them", "the very best", or "the most beautiful of the women".

== Titles ==
- Hereditary Noblewoman/Hereditary Princess (ỉryt-pꜥt)
- female sovereign (ḥqꜣ.t)
- She who says something and it is done (for her) immediately (ḏdt-ḫt-nbt-ỉr.tw-n.s)
- Great Royal Wife, his Beloved (ḥmt-nsw-wrt-mry.t-f)
- God's Wife (ḥmt-nṯr)
- Great One of the harem of Horus (the King) who is the Lord of the Palace (wrt-ḫnr-n-Ḥr-Nb-ꜥḥ)
- Mistress of the Beautiful Maidens of the Palace (ḥnwt-nfrwt-ꜥḥ)
- Mother of the God (mwt-nṯr)
- The Good Mother/The good goddess Mut (mwt-nfrt)
- The Greatly Praised One (wrt-ḥswt)
- Lady of the Two Lands (nbt-tꜣwy)
- Mistress of the Two Lands (ḥnwt-tꜣwy)
- Wife of the Victorious Bull (ḥmt-kꜣ-nḫt)
- Mistress of the North and South (ḥnwt-rsy-mḥw)
- Mistress of All Lands (ḥnwt-tꜣw-nbw)
- Mistress of Charm (nbt-ỉmꜣt)
- Great of Love in the Circlet-Diadem (wrt-mrwt-m-sšd)
- Sweet of Love (bnrt-mrwt)
- Enjoying favour
- Beloved of the king (mry.t-nswt)
- She Who Unites with the Sovereign (ẖnmt-ỉty)
- She Whom Horus (the King) Remembers (sḫꜣwt-Ḥr.s)
- The Greatly Beloved One (ꜥꜣt-mrwt)
- She who Makes Hearts Joyous (dỉ.s ỉbw ḥr ršwt)
- Mistress of Beauty (ḥnwt-nfrwt)
- Radiant of Limbs (wḫb-ꜥwy)
- Beautiful of Face (nfr.t-ḥr)
- Beautiful with the Tall Plumed-Diadem (ꜥnt-m-šwty)
- Lofty of Plumes (qꜣt-šwty)
- She who satisfies the Gods (sḥtpt-nṯrw)
- She who Appeases Horus (the King) with Her Voice (sḥtpt-Ḥr.s-m-ḫrw.s)
- Sweet of Voice when She Chants (mrt-ḫrw-m-šmꜥ)
- Lovely of Hands while Holding the Sistrum (ꜥnt-ḏrty-ẖr-sššty)
- Who Plays the Sistra in Karnak (sḥmyt-m-Ipt-swt)
- She who occupies a place in the Temple of Amun (ẖnmt-st-m-pr-ỉmn)
- Possessor of charm, sweetness, and love (nbt-ỉmꜣt-bnrt-mrwt)
- Beloved of Hathor (mryt-Ḥwt-Ḥr)
- Beloved of Anuket (mryt-ꜥnkt)
- Beloved of Werethekau (mryt-Wrt-ḥkꜣw)
- Beloved of Mut (mryt-Mwt)
- Beloved of Satis (mryt-Sṯt)
- Beloved of Isis (mryt-ꜣst)

The pharaoh did not hesitate to say of her that all her desires were just, and that all her words, as soon as they were spoken, lit up joy on faces. "One is pleased with (any word) she utters—whatever she says is done for her—since every good thing (happens) according to her wish.""Her every word pleases the [ear] and one lives by hearing her voice!"

Ramesses II also named her 'The one for whom the sun shines'.

== Family ==
Although Nefertari's family background is unknown, the discovery in her tomb of a knob inscribed with the cartouche of Pharaoh Ay has led people to speculate she was related to him. The time between the reign of Ay and Ramesses II means that Nefertari could not possibly have been a daughter of Ay, though she could have had all her children in her early to mid-30s, and, if any relation exists at all, she would be a great-granddaughter. However, there is no conclusive evidence linking Nefertari to the royal family of the 18th Dynasty. It should also be noted that, although Ay is associated with Nefertari, Ay is not regarded as a legitimate pharaoh in the orthodox royal tradition. The same applies to all the pharaohs between Amenhotep III and Horemheb. An identity that lacked political recognition could not make any positive contribution to royal legitimacy. Furthermore, Nefertari's priestly titles cannot be taken as evidence that she had served as a priestess before her marriage. Nearly all of the priestly offices she held were not hereditary positions that could be transmitted by descent within non-royal families during the New Kingdom. Rather, these titles reflected Nefertari's role as a deified Great Royal Wife: the female counterpart of the king, the feminine aspect of kingship, and the goddess associated with the deified pharaoh. Once a queen was elevated into the divine sphere, her relationship with the gods became far more significant than any earthly kinship she might have possessed. Since the pharaoh himself showed little concern for whether the worldly origins of his mothers and wives were exceptionally noble, there is likewise no need for modern scholars to insist on assigning these women a royal or exceptionally noble family background, and claiming that they acquired their extremely elevated status precisely because of their birth; after Hatshepsut, during the New Kingdom, the evidence may in fact suggest the opposite, as we do not see Ankhesenamun or Tanedjemet occupying prominent positions during the reigns of Ay or Seti I.

Nefertari married Ramesses II before he ascended the throne. Nefertari had at least four sons and two daughters. Amun-her-khepeshef, the eldest, was Crown Prince and Commander of the Troops, and Pareherwenemef would later serve in Ramesses II's army. Prince Meryatum was elevated to the position of High Priest of Re in Heliopolis. Inscriptions mention he was a son of Nefertari. Prince Meryre is a fourth son mentioned on the façade of the small temple at Abu Simbel and is thought to be another son of Nefertari. Meritamen and Henuttawy are two royal daughters depicted on the façade of the small temple at Abu Simbel and are thought to be daughters of Nefertari.

Princesses named Bak(et)mut, Nefertari, and Nebettawy are sometimes suggested as further daughters of Nefertari based on their presence in Great temple of Abu Simbel, but there is no concrete evidence for this supposed family relation.

== Biography ==
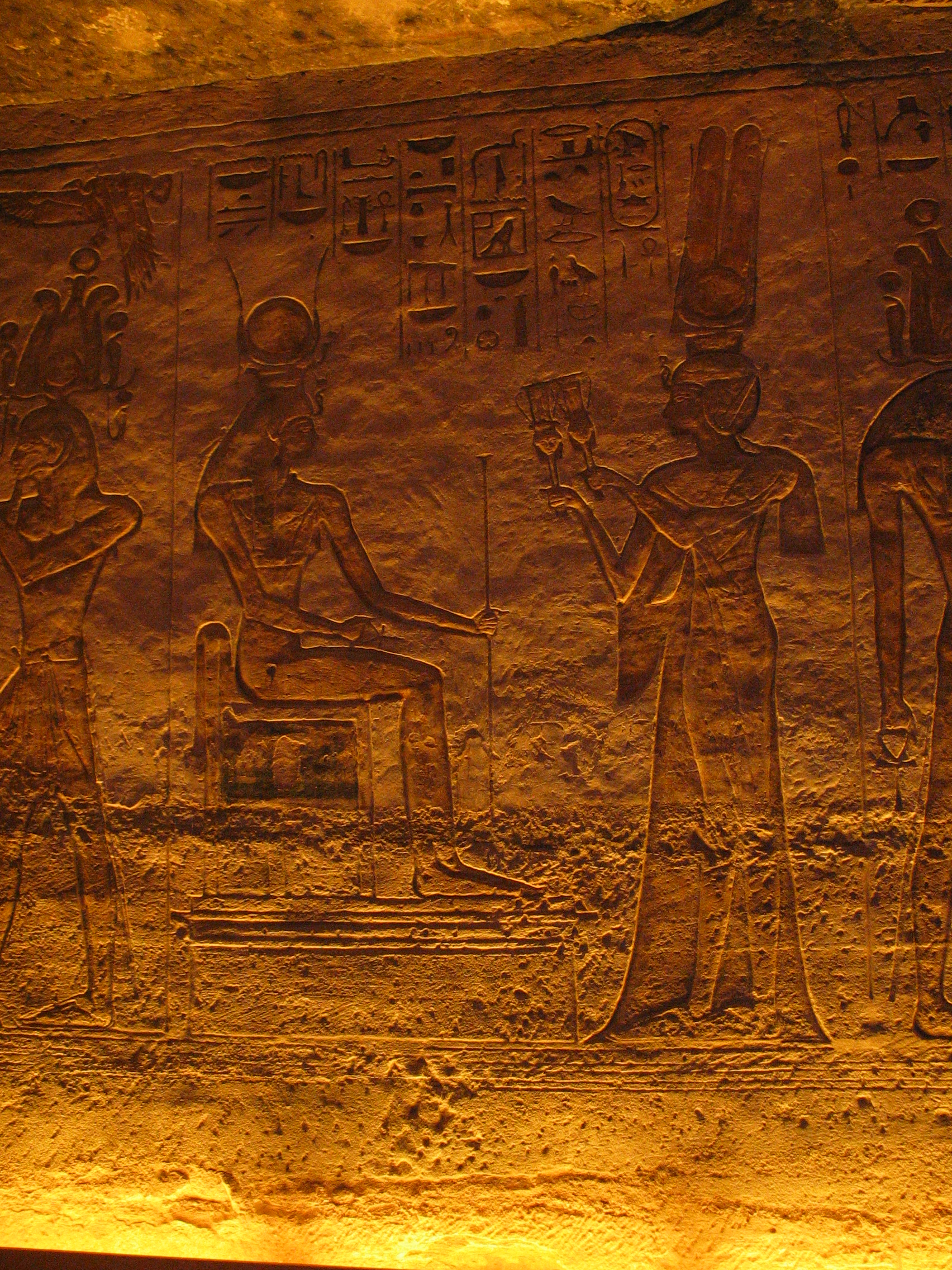
Nefertari depicted offering sistrums to Hathor in her smaller temple of Abu Simbel

Nefertari first appears as the wife of Ramesses II in official scenes during the first year of Ramesses II. In the tomb of Nebwenenef, Nefertari is depicted behind her husband as he elevates Nebwenenef to the position of High Priest of Amun during a visit to Abydos. Nefertari also appears in a scene next to a year 1 stela. She is depicted shaking two sistra before Taweret, Thoth, and Nut.

Nefertari is an important presence in the scenes from Luxor and Karnak. In a scene from Luxor, Nefertari appears leading the royal children. Another scene shows Nefertari at the Festival of the Mast of Amun-Min-Kamephis. The king and the queen are said to worship in the new temple and are shown overseeing the Erection of the Mast before Amen-Re attended by standard bearers. Nefertari's speech during this ceremony is recorded:

Your beloved son, the Lord of Both Lands, Usermaatre Setepenre, has come to see you in your beautiful manifestation. He has erected for you the mast of the (pavilion)-framework. May you grant him eternity as King, and victory over those rebellious (against) His Majesty, L.P.H.

Nefertari appears as Ramesses II's consort on many statues in both Luxor and Karnak. In Western Thebes, Nefertari is mentioned on a statuary group from Deir el-Bahari, a stela and blocks from Deir el-Medina.

The greatest honor was bestowed on Nefertari however in Abu Simbel. Nefertari is depicted in statue form at the great temple, but the small temple is dedicated to Nefertari and the goddess Hathor. The building project was started earlier in the reign of Ramesses II, The temple had already been completed and put into use before the twentieth year of Ramesses II's reign, with some of its decorations added at a later stage.

Traces of Nefertari are not only extensively attested in Upper Egypt but are also well documented in Lower Egypt, even though most of the monuments there are dilapidated and poorly preserved. Evidence of Nefertari has been found at Pi-Ramesses, Heliopolis, Bubastis, Giza, Memphis, and the Sinai Peninsula—Egypt’s Asian territory. In these places, in addition to large-scale independent statues, Nefertari also appears on numerous minor commemorative artifacts. For instance, at Qantir in Pi-Ramesses, many cartouche stamp seals have been unearthed, the vast majority belonging to Ramesses II, with some also attributed to Merenptah, Seti II, Ramesses III, VIII, and X. However, among them are also some belonging to Nefertari, making her the only individual other than pharaohs to whom such stamp seals are attributed. These seals feature exquisite depictions of her, all showing her standing in a posture where she holds a sistrum in one hand and gestures in adoration with the other. She appears either alone or standing before the goddess Hathor, bearing the title of "Chantress." The presence of these stamp seals indicates that her name was widely disseminated in this area. A privately owned lapis lazuli plaque also mentions Nefertari alongside the Memphite goddess Sekhmet, belonging to the "Lady of the House, Inuhai," who may have served Nefertari in the Memphite palace. Additionally, a statuette of Nefertari was discovered in a private tomb at Giza, suggesting that people in this region wished to bring her commemorative objects with them into the afterlife.

She also appears on the limestone colossus of the pharaoh from the Temple of Ptah in Memphis. Her titles here included "Hereditary Noblewoman/Hereditary Princess", "The Greatly Praised One", and "Great Royal Wife". During the reign of Ramesses II, the first two titles were never conferred upon any queen who was not a daughter of the king, except for Nefertari and Queen Mother Tuya, just as, apart from them, no royal woman who was not a king's daughter was associated with the pharaoh's colossal statues in temples throughout the land.

In Tanis, the feet of a statue of Ramesses II and the arm and torso of a statue of Nefertari were unearthed. They had been transferred there from Pi-Ramesses/Avaris.

Nefertari's prominence at court is further supported by cuneiform tablets from the Hittite city of Hattusas (today Boghazkoy, Turkey), containing Nefertari's correspondence with the king Hattusili III and his wife Puduhepa. She is mentioned in the letters as Naptera. Nefertari is known to have sent gifts to Puduhepa:

So (says) Naptera, the Great Queen of the Land of Egypt, to Puduhepa, the Great Queen of the land of Hatti, say (as follows): For me, your sister all is well and my country is well. For you, my sister, may all be well and may your land be well. I have now heard that you, my sister, have written to me to enquire about my well-being, and that you have written me about the relationship of good peace and good brotherhood in which the Great King, the King of the Land of Egypt, (now stands) with the Great King, the King of the Land of Hatti, his brother. May the Sun God and the Storm God exalt you and may the Sun God cause peace to flourish and bestow good brotherhood on the Great King, the King of the Land of Egypt, and the Great King, the King of the Land of Hatti, his brother forever. And I also am at peace and am sisterly with you, my sister, as well. Now, I have sent to you a present as a greetings-gift for you, my sister, that I have sent in the hands of Parikhnawa, the royal messenger: 1 (necklace) for the neck, multicolored, made of fine gold consisting of 12 strands, which weighs 88 shekels. 1 colorful cloak made from royal fabric. 1 colorful tunic made from royal fabric. 5 colorful garments of excellent quality. 5 colorful tunics of excellent quality. Total: 12 garments.

Nefertari had already passed away before the erection of the stela of Heqanakht, in which she is depicted holding the ankh symbol and being venerated as a goddess by Heqanakht. Her daughter, together with the pharaoh, is shown worshipping the three deities of the Great Temple of Abu Simbel (including the deified Ramesses II), at which time Nefertari was already deceased. In the past, this stela was mistakenly thought to represent the dedication ceremony of Abu Simbel, a theory that has since been refuted. The tenure of Heqanakht, the Viceroy of Kush, ended in the twenty-fourth year of Ramesses II's reign, and Nefertari must therefore have died before this date.

After her death she was buried in tomb QV66 in the Valley of the Queens.

== Monuments ==
=== Abu Simbel, great temple ===
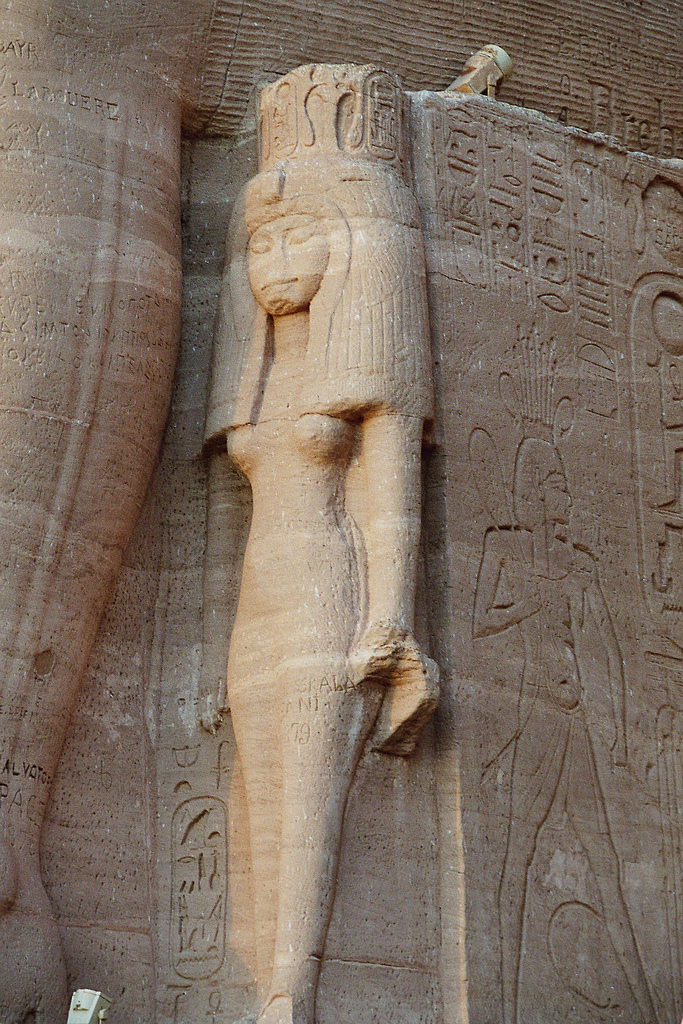
Nefertari beside a colossus of Ramesses II

Nefertari appears twice as one of the royal women represented beside the colossal statues of Ramesses II that stand before the temple. To the left of the doorway, Nefertari, Queen-Mother Tuya and the king's son Amun-her-khepeshef (still called Amunhirwenemef here) flank the colossal statue of the king. To the right of the doorway Nefertari, Baketmut and the king's son Ramesses are shown with the Pharaoh.

Inside the temple Nefertari is depicted on one of the pillars in the great pillared hall worshipping Hathor of Ibshek.

On the wall of the inner pillared hall Nefertari appears behind Ramesses II. They stand before the barque of Amun, and Nefertari is shown playing the sistra. Elsewhere Nefertari and Ramesses II are shown before a barque dedicated to a deified Ramesses II. Nefertari is shown twice accompanying her husband in Triumph scenes.

=== Abu Simbel, small temple ===
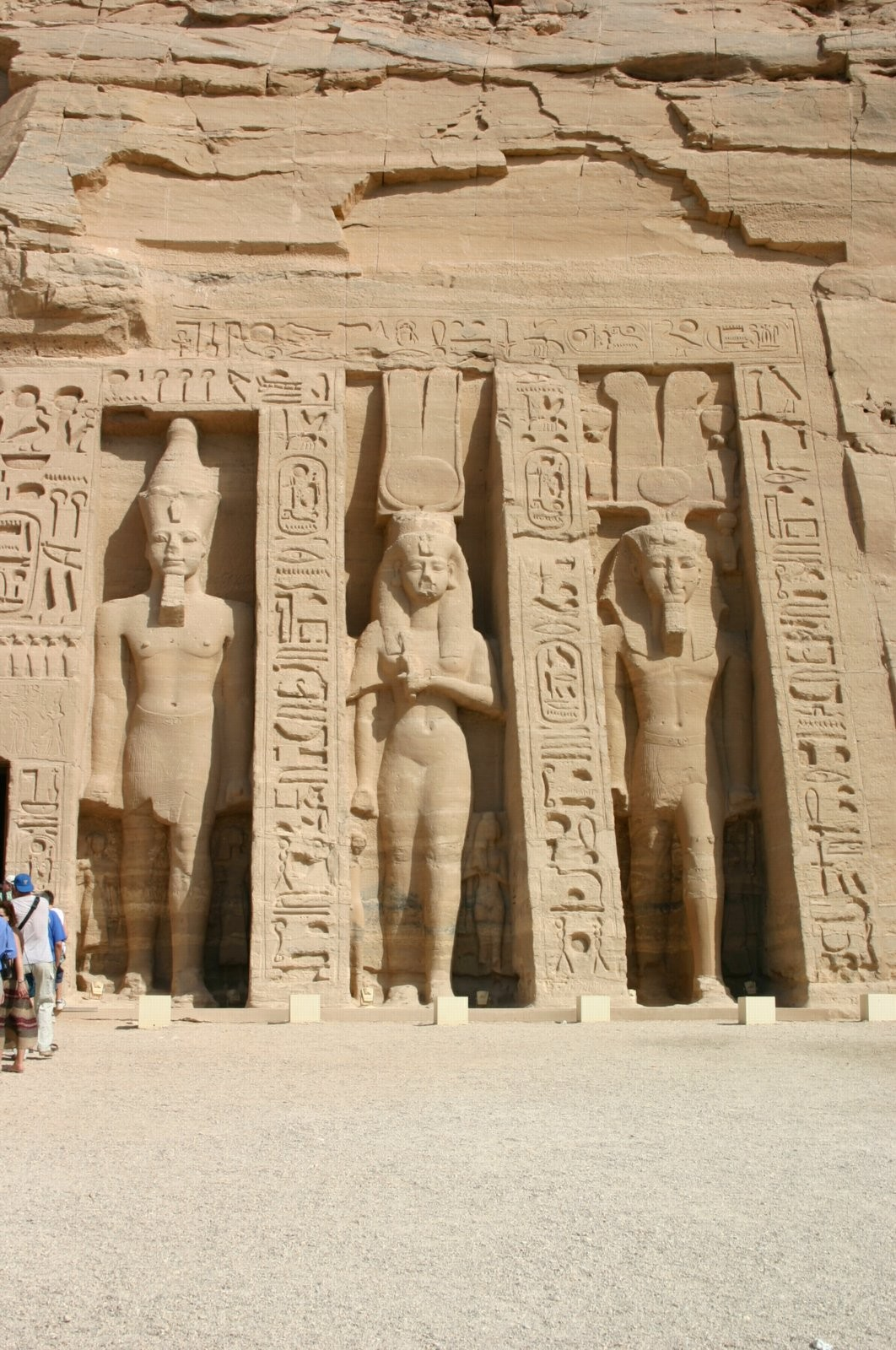
Temple of Nefertari at Abu Simbel

The small temple at Abu Simbel was dedicated to Nefertari and Hathor of Ibshek. The dedication text on one of the buttresses states:

"A temple of great and Mighty monuments, for the Great Royal Wife Nefertari Meryetmut, for whose sake the (very) sun does shine, given life and beloved" (Kitchen).

While on other buttresses it says:

"King of South and North Egypt, Usermaatre Setepenre; he has made a Temple by excavation in the mountain, of eternal work(manship) in Nubia, which the King of South and North Egypt, Usermaatre Setepenre has made for the Great Royal Wife Nefertari Meryetmut, in Nubia, like Re forever and ever" (Kitchen).

The two colossal standing statues of Nefertari in front of the small temple are equal in size to those of Ramesses II. Nefertari is shown holding a sistrum. She wears a long sheet dress and she is depicted with a long wig, Hathoric cow horns, the solar disk, and tall feathers mounted on a modius.

In the interior of the temple, Nefertari appears in a variety of scenes. She is shown for instance offering to a cow (Hathor) in a papyrus thicket, offering before Khnum, Satis, and Anuket, the triad of Elephantine, and offering to Mut and Hathor.

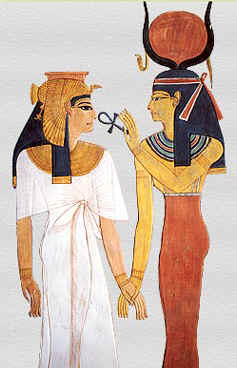
The goddess Hathor giving an ankh, representing "life", to Nefertari

=== Ramesseum, small temple ===
The small temple of the Ramesseum is dedicated to Nefertari and the Queen Mother Tuya. This temple was jointly associated with the two of them. This temple is divided into two parts, each dedicated to them respectively. According to Lurson, it is "that of a monument staging the political role and place of women, in this case the king's mother and wife, within the monarchical institution as well as within the king's family; in short, that of a monument of monarchical ideology." They also appear in other parts of the Ramesseum. For example, on the southern doorway of the columned hall entrance, Nefertari stands before Tuya, playing sistrums, and they walk together toward a small chapel built in their honor. Similarly, at the Ramesseum, they appear together alongside the colossal statue of Ramesses II.

=== Temple of the Great Royal Wife Nefertari–Meritmut ===
The funerary inscriptions of the official Yuy record a "Temple of the Great Royal Wife Nefertari–Meritmut," and Yuy served as the High Steward of this temple. This indicates that the temple was located in Thebes.

=== The Temple of Aniba ===
The Temple of Aniba houses a statue of Nefertari and features a complete set of associated cult practices, with clear evidence showing that these rituals continued at least until the reign of Ramses VI.

=== Tomb 66 in the Valley of the Queens ===
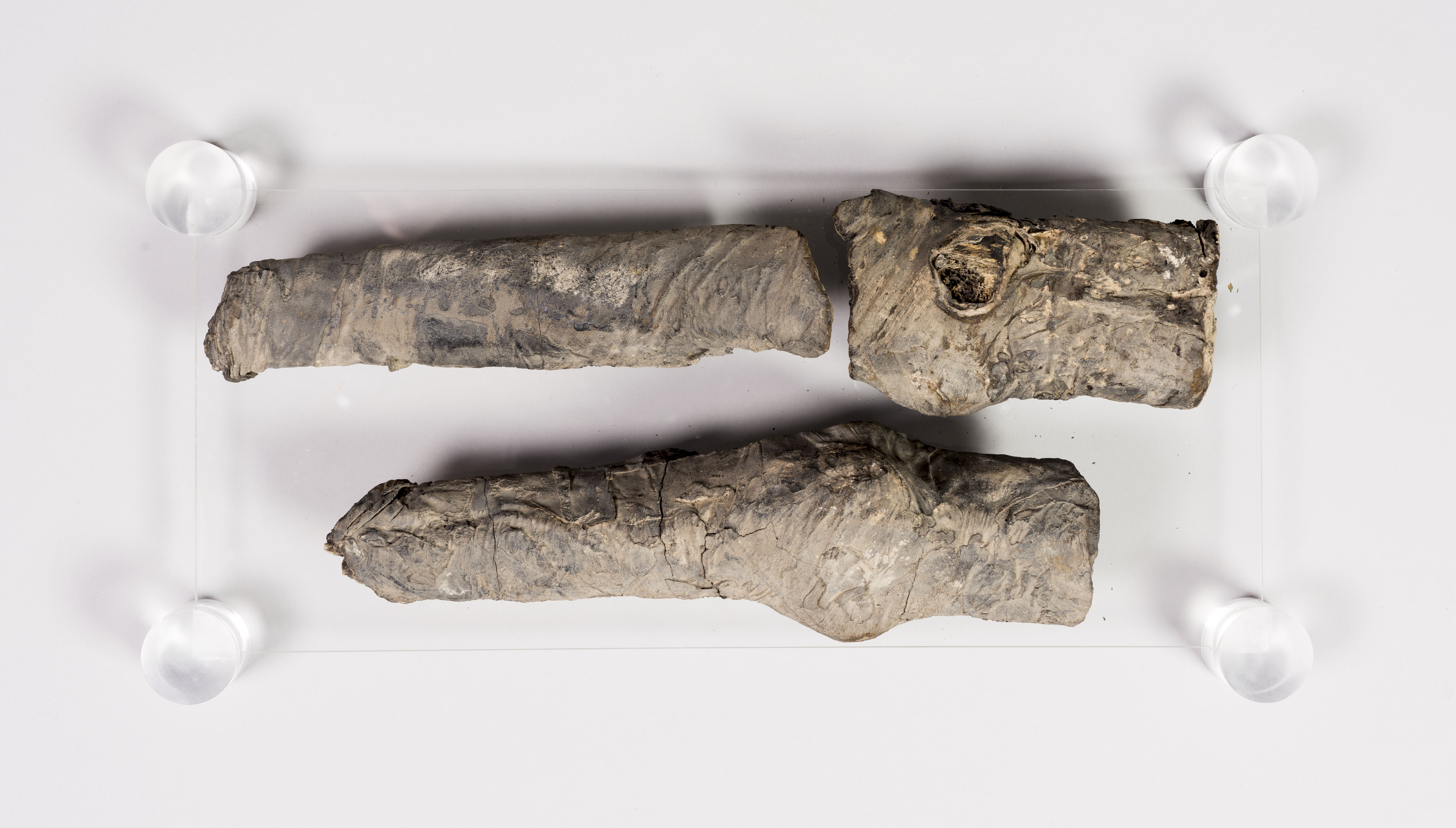
Legs of the mummy of Nefertari. Museo Egizio, Turin (S.5154).

The tomb of Nefertari, QV66 is one of the largest in the Valley of the Queens. It is 520 square meters, and covered with pictures of Nefertari. Her husband, the pharaoh, is not represented in any of the pictures. This was due to religious considerations: in the Valley of the Queens, none of the royal tombs of the queens contain any male members of the royal family. In order for the queens to exercise supreme authority within their tombs, the pharaoh had to be absent. In fact, the presence of a pharaoh in a queen's tomb was regarded as a strict taboo. However, a queen could indeed appear in a pharaoh's tomb. Nefertari appears in the tomb of Ramesses II; she is the only queen depicted in his tomb, and the only queen of the entire Eighteenth and Nineteenth Dynasties to appear in her husband's tomb. Other queens could at most appear in the tombs of their sons.

Nefertari can be seen wearing Greek silver earrings with a labrys design in one of the portraits. These would have been sent to her as a gift for diplomatic reasons. The tomb was robbed in antiquity. In 1904 it was rediscovered and excavated by Ernesto Schiaparelli. Several items from the tomb that were overlooked by the tomb robbers, including parts of gold bracelets, shabti figures and a small piece of an earring or pendant are now in the Boston Museum of Fine Arts. Additional shabti figures are in the Egyptian Museum in Cairo.

The pair of mummified legs found by Schiaparelli in QV66 and now at the Museo Egizio of Turin were identified as, most probably, the knees of Nefertari based on the bone structure and the age of the person, which fits the profile of the queen.
