= KV5 =

Ancient Egyptian tomb for the sons of Ramesses II

- Burial site of Sons of Ramesses II
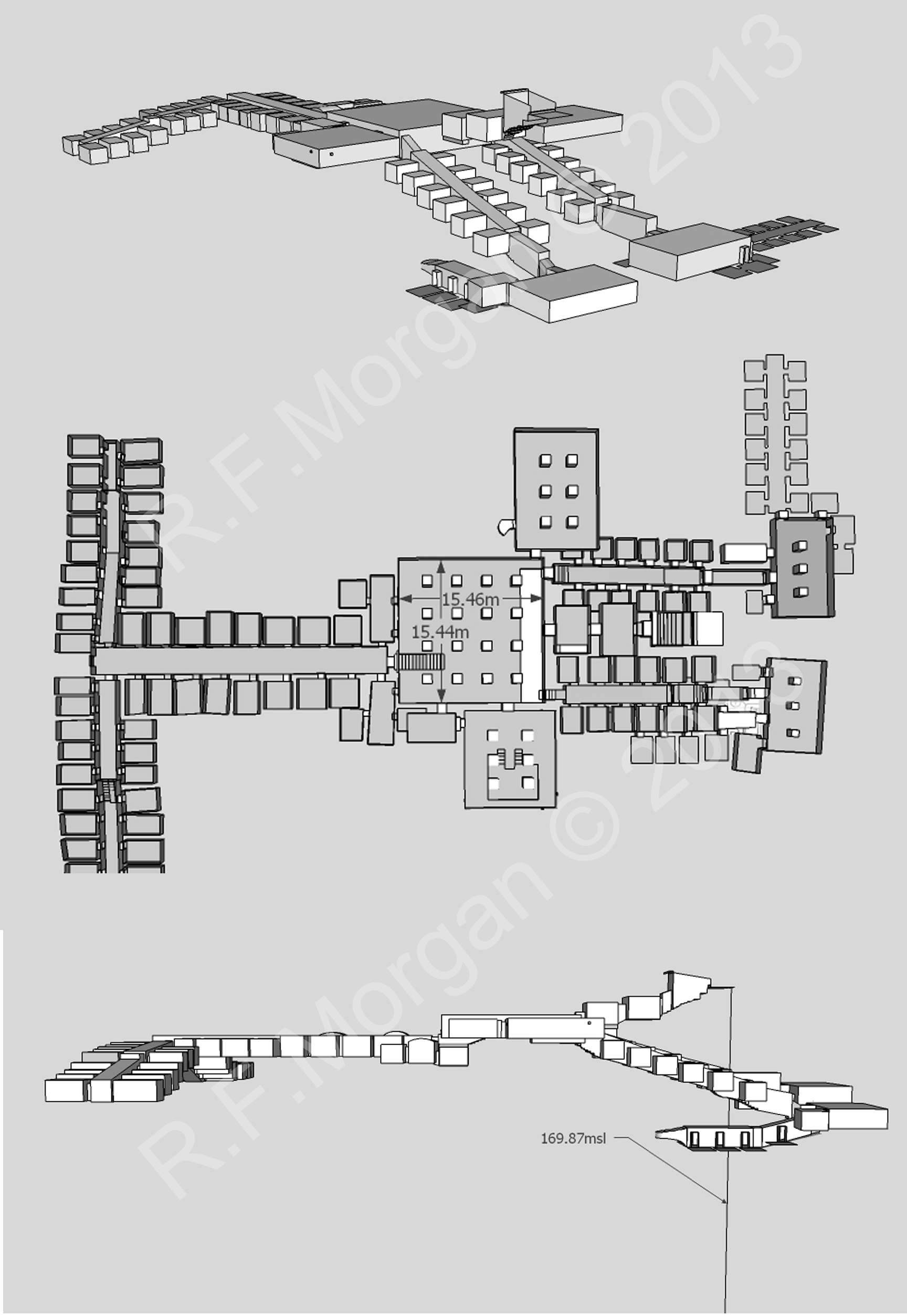
- Schematic drawing of KV5

- Location within Egypt
- Coordinates: 25°44′26.2″N 32°36′07.1″E
- Location: East Valley of the Kings
- Discovered: 1825
- Excavated by: Kent R. Weeks (1995)
- Decoration: Opening of the Mouth
- Layout: Labyrinth
- ← Previous; KV4 Next → KV6

Tomb KV5 is a subterranean, rock-cut tomb in the Valley of the Kings. It belonged to the sons of Ramesses II. Though KV5 was partially excavated as early as 1825, its true extent was discovered in 1995 by Kent R. Weeks and his exploration team. The tomb is now known to be the largest in the Valley of the Kings. Weeks' discovery is widely considered the most dramatic in the valley since the discovery of the tomb of Tutankhamun in 1922.

== History ==
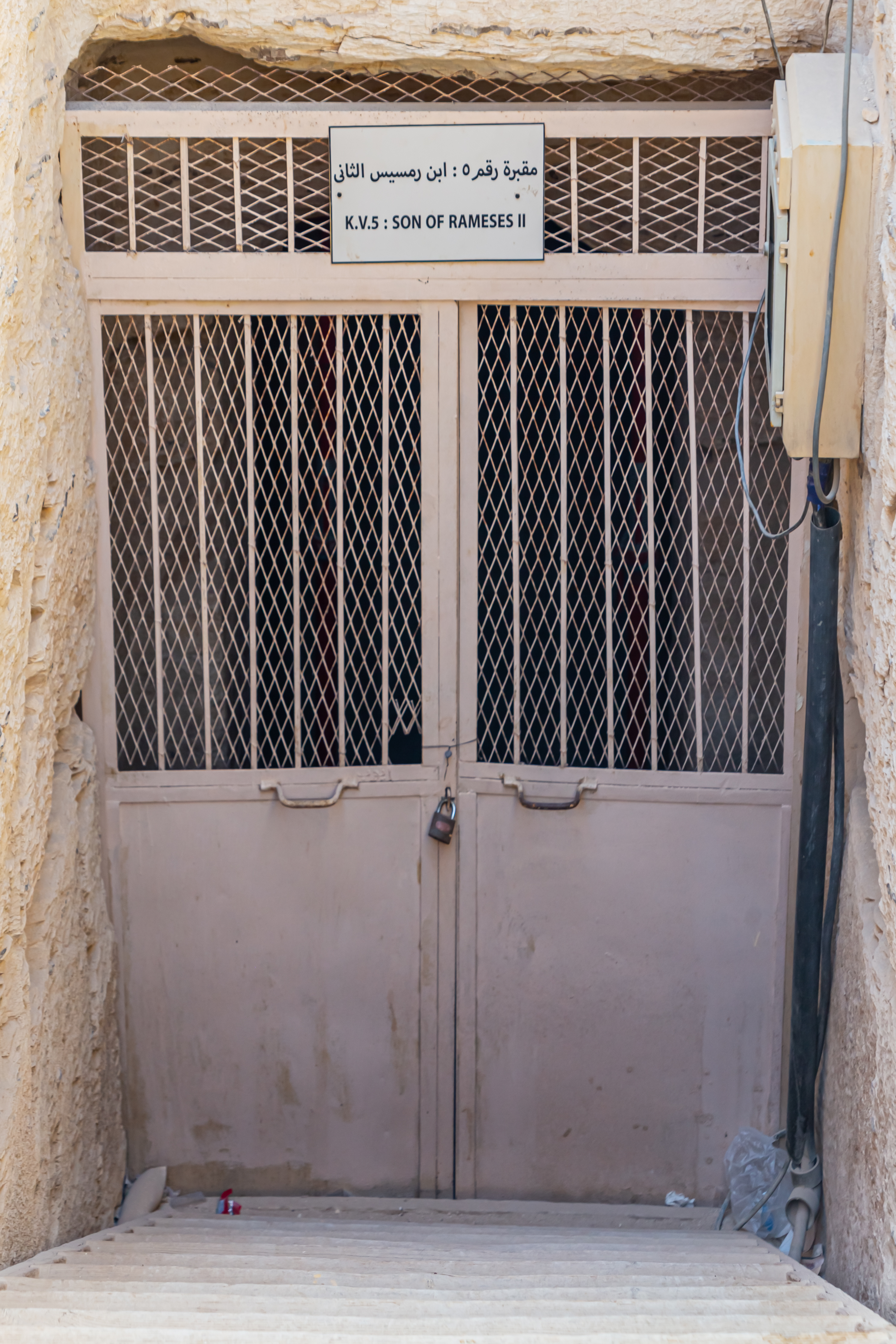
Entrance to the closed tomb of KV5

Standing near the entrance to the Valley, KV5 was robbed in antiquity. In addition, over the centuries, it suffered the fate of other low-lying tombs, which was to be filled with rubble washed down in the flash floods that accompany thunderstorms over the Valley.

The tomb was examined several times once exploration of the Valley in relatively modern times started, first in 1825 (by James Burton), and later in 1902 (by Howard Carter, discoverer of the tomb of Tutankhamun, who used KV5 only as a dumping ground). However, they were not able to penetrate past the first few rooms, and thus saw nothing unusual about the tomb.

It was not until the Theban Mapping Project, under Kent R. Weeks, began clearing the tomb (in part to see if it would be damaged by proposed building works nearby, and in part so that it could be mapped) that the stage was set for the discovery of its true extent and nature. Although the works had begun in 1987, the first substantial finding came in 1995, after extensive clearing in the outer chambers of the tomb: approximately 70 rooms, lined along long corridors, running back into the hillside. The number of rooms corresponds roughly to the number of sons the pharaoh sired. This discovery caused a worldwide sensation and reignited popular interest in Egyptology. Findings so far include thousands of potshards, ushabti, faience beads, hieratic ostraca, glass vials, inlays and a large statue of Osiris, the god of the afterlife.

Further excavations have revealed that the tomb is even larger than was first thought, as it contains more corridors, with more rooms, branching off from previously discovered parts of the tomb. At least 130 rooms or chambers have been discovered as of 2006 (only about 7% of which have been cleared), and work is still continuing on clearing the rest of the tomb.

Located near the tomb of Ramesses II (KV7), KV5 contained most of his children, both male and female, in particular those who died in his lifetime. The skull fragments of Amun-her-khepeshef, among others, were found inside and reconstructed.

== See also ==
- List of children of Ramesses II
