= Amun-her-khepeshef =

King's Son and Heir Apparent

- King's Son; Commander of the Troops; Effective Confidant; Fan-bearer on the King's Right Hand; Royal Scribe
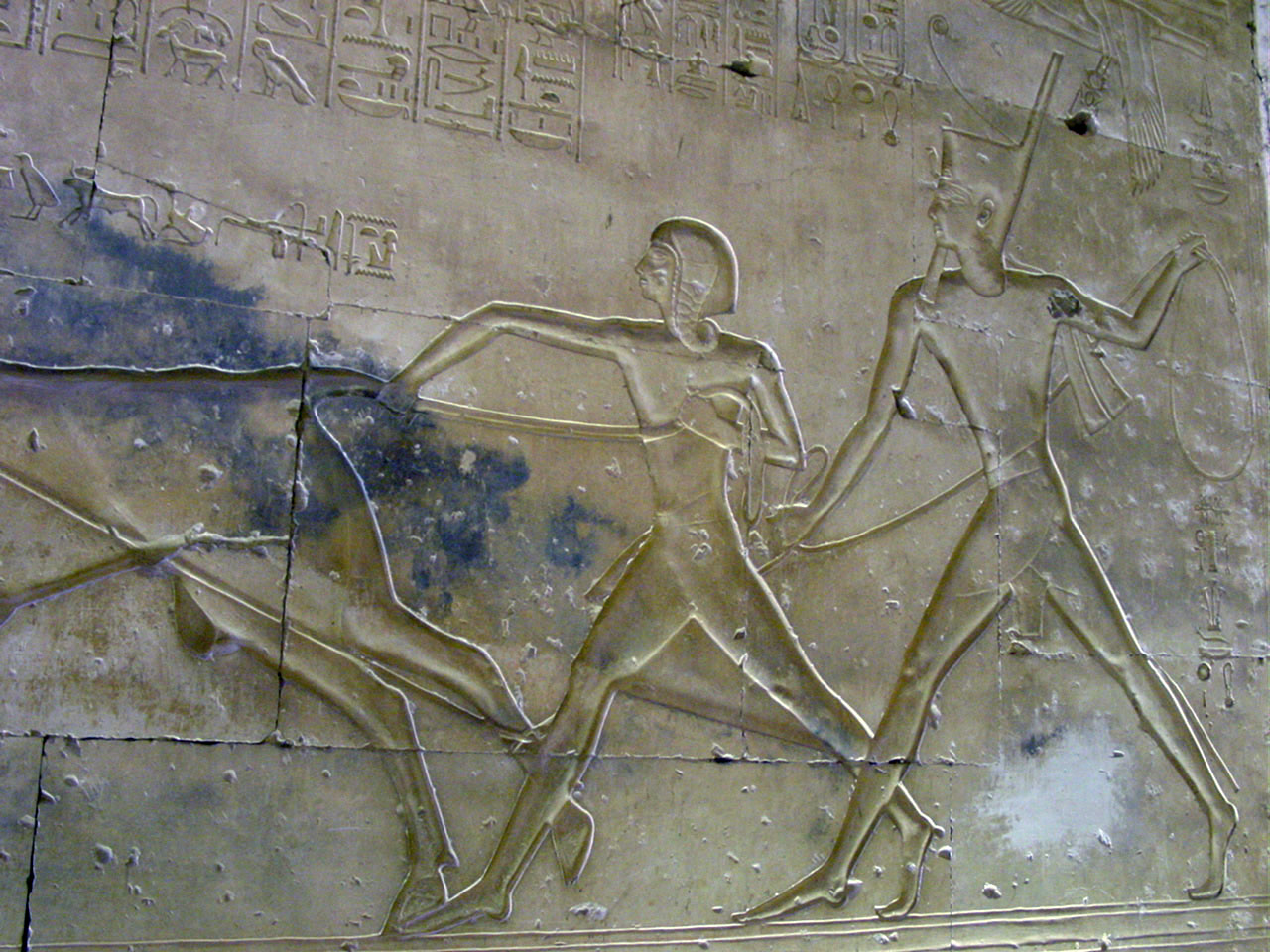
- Prince Amun-her-kepshef (centre) at the Temple of Abydos
Egyptian name
i mn n D2 Z1 F23 A51jmn ḥr ḫpš.f
- Dynasty: 19th of Egypt
- Died: c. 1263 BC
- Burial: KV5, Thebes
- Spouse: Nefertari II
- Father: Ramesses II
- Mother: Nefertari
- Children: Seti

Amun-her-khepeshef (died c. 1263 BC; also Amonhirkhopshef, Amun-her-wenemef and Amun-her-khepeshef A (Note: The "A" in this name is not part of the original Egyptian name, rather it is a denomination added in modern Egyptology to distinguish him from other people of the same name: Amenherkhepshef B, a son of Ramesses III, Amenherkhepshef C, Ramesses VI, and Amenherkhepshef D, a son of Ramesses VI.)) was the firstborn son of Pharaoh Ramesses II and Queen Nefertari.

== Name ==
He was born during the reign of his grandfather Seti I. He was originally called Amun-her-wenemef ("Amun Is with His Right Arm"). He changed his name to Amun-her-khepeshef ("Amun is with His Strong Arm") early in his father's reign. He appears to have changed his name once again to Seth-her-khepeshef ("Seth is with His Strong Arm") around Year 20 of Ramesses II. Seth-her-khepeshef was formerly thought to be another son of Ramesses II.

== Biography ==
Amun-her-khepeshef was first in line to inherit the throne of Egypt from his father, Ramesses II's. He died before inheriting his father's titles 25 years into his father's rule. Ramesses B, Ramesses II's second oldest son became the new crown prince. He also died before his father after another 25 years. Merenptah, the 13th son of Ramesses II would eventually assume the throne after 67 years of reign.

Amun-her-khepeshef held several titles, including personal titles such as "Commander of the Troops", "Effective Confidant" and "Eldest Son of the King of his Body." Some other titles were shared between prominent princes, such as "Fan-bearer on the King's Right Hand" and "Royal Scribe". He held a high position in the army. According to some relief depictions, he and his younger half-brother Khaemwaset either fought or were at least present in the Battle of Kadesh and the campaigns in Nubia, along with their father. He appears on an inscription in the Temple of Beit el-Wali. Amun-her-khepeshef was involved in an exchange of diplomatic correspondence with the Hittites after Ramesses II and the Hittite king Hattusili III signed their peace treaty following the battle of Kadesh.

Despite appearing multiple times in war scenes at various major temples, Amun-her-khepeshef was not deeply involved in military affairs; his military titles were likely more a reflection of his status as crown prince than of actual participation in warfare. He primarily played a role in detaining enemy captives. His younger brothers were more actively involved in military affairs. Prince Ramesses held the title of “First Great General,” while Pareherwenemef was the highest-ranking military figure among all the princes. In contrast, he was more active in religious and political spheres. Eventually, under the name Seth-her-khepeshef, he held the following titles: “The Hereditary Prince and Count, God’s Father beloved of the god, Chief of Secrets of the King’s House, Lord in charge of the entire land, Sem-priest of the Good God, Delegate and Judge of the Two Lands, Controller of Lands Far Flung (Hau-nebu), the King’s Son, united with the Throne of Horus, Hereditary Prince and Royal Scribe.” However, this doesn't mean he never actually participated in military operations, he might have died on the battlefield.

Statues and depictions of Amun-her-khepeshef appear in temples in Abu Simbel, Luxor, in the Ramesseum, and in Seti's Abydos. He is depicted alongside his father on the temple walls of Abydos, lassoing a bull together. He also appears on statues of Ramesses II.

== Death ==
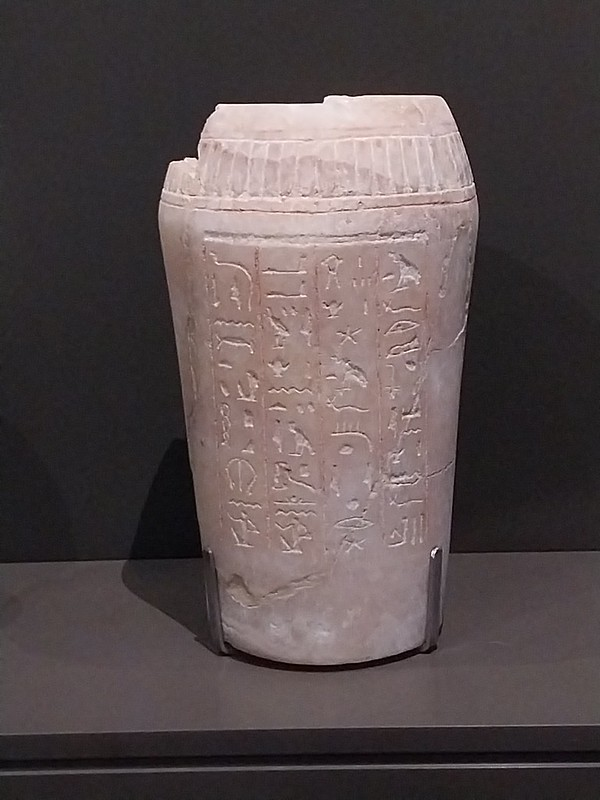
Canopic jar of Amun-her-khepeshef

Amun-her-khepeshef married Nefertari II. She was the daughter of Amun-her-khepeshef's father and also possibly the daughter of his mother, Queen Nefertari, making his wife his own sister or half-sister. Together they bore a son called Seti. Amun-her-khepeshef died approximately 25 years into his father's reign. Amun-her-khepeshef's half-brother Ramesses, the eldest son of Ramesses II's second wife called Isetnofret, became next in line. Amun-her-khepeshef was buried in tomb KV5, built for the sons of Ramesses II, in the Valley of the Kings. In the 53rd year of Ramesses II’s reign, records indicate that inspections were carried out on the tombs of the princes, including his own.

Among the artefacts found in the tomb were canopic jars labeled with Amun-her-khepeshef's name, containing human organs, along with bones from four separate human males. Whether he changed his name back to Amun-her-khepeshef before his death, had it changed back posthumously or whether the funerary equipment were already inscribed and used as-is is currently unknown. The bones included a skull with a deep bone fracture, believed to have been caused by a mace.

== See also ==
- List of children of Ramesses II
- Nineteenth Dynasty of Egypt family tree
