= Isetnofret (given name) =

st t H8 nfr D21 t B7
Isetnofret
in hieroglyphs
Era: New Kingdom
(1550–1069 BC)

Isetnofret (3s.t-nfr.t; also spelled as Isetneferet, Isisnofret etc.) was an ancient Egyptian female name, meaning “Isis is beautiful”.

- Princess Isetnofret, possibly the daughter of Pharaoh Horemheb and the mother of Queen Isetnofret.
- Queen Isetnofret I, a wife of Pharaoh Ramesses II and mother of Pharaoh Merenptah. Several of her descendants shared her name:
- Princess Isetnofret B, sixth daughter of Ramesses II. Often thought to be a daughter of Queen Isetnofret, however, this identification is only based on the identical names and is not supported by other evidence; the stelae of Prince Khaemwaset, which depict his closest family members, show only Prince Ramesses, Queen Bintanath and Prince Merenptah along with Khaemwaset and his parents, she is not among them. A letter, in which two of her servants, Pentawer and Pawekhed inquire about her health and wish her the blessings of Ptah, was found.
- Princess Isetnofret C, daughter of Prince Khaemwese, thus a granddaughter of Queen Isetnofret. A tomb of a woman called Isetnofret, discovered in 2009, was originally reported to belong to the daughter of Khaemwaset. Zahi Hawass, though, dated it earlier, to the 18th dynasty.
- Queen Isetnofret II, wife of Merenptah. She is identical with one of the aforementioned two Isetnofrets, possibly the second one, since she does not have the title King's Daughter, which she would use if she was the daughter of Ramesses. She is depicted in a chapel in Gebel es-Silsileh on a statue (usurped by Merenptah from Amenhotep III), also, on a stela of Vizier Panehsy and on another statue.
- Princess Isetnofret D, likely a daughter of Merenptah.
