= Hori II (vizier) =

Egyptian vizier

Hori
- Vizier of Egypt
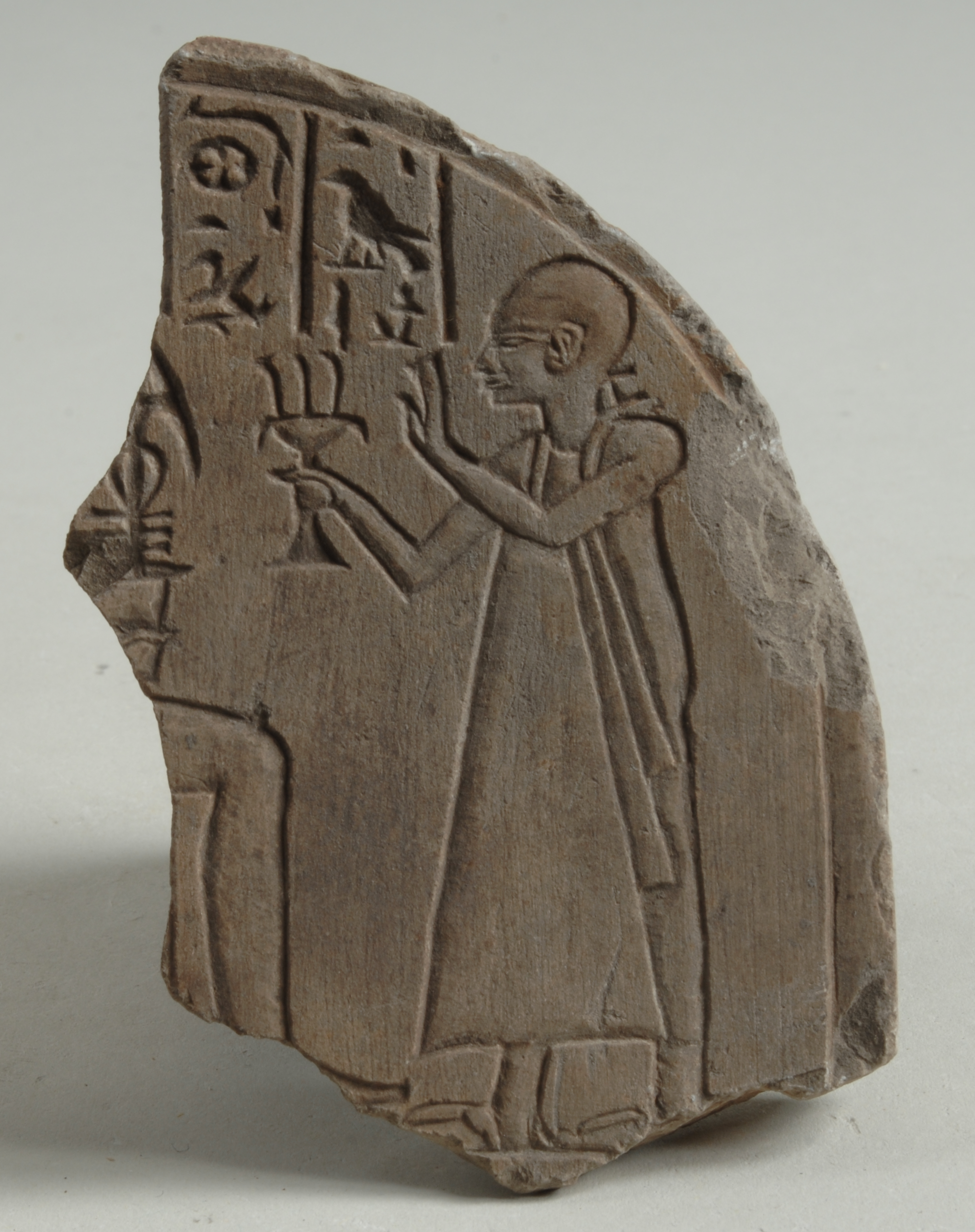
- Fragment of stela depicting the vizier Hori, Museo Egizio, Turin
- Predecessor: Paraemheb
- Successor: To or Hewernef
- Dynasty: 19th Dynasty and 20th Dynasty
- Pharaoh: Seti II, Siptah, Twosret, Setnakhte and Ramesses III
- Father: Hori I

Hori was a vizier of Ancient Egypt. He served during the reign of pharaohs Seti II, Siptah, Twosret, Setnakhte and Ramesses III.

== Family ==
Hori was the son of the High Priest of Ptah Hori I and the grandson of prince Khaemweset, thus a direct descendant of pharaoh Ramesses II.

== Biography ==
Hori served as Vizier from the reign of Sety II to the 16th year of Ramesses III. Hori succeeded the vizier Paraemheb in office.
Hori was likely succeeded in office by To in year 16 of Ramesses III. The successor may have also been Hewernef, but this depends on the reading of a short, unclear text written on an ostrakon from Deir el-Medina, now located in the National Archaeological Museum of Florence.

== Ancestry ==
Ancestors of Hori II (vizier)

16. Pharaoh Seti I
8. Pharaoh Ramesses II
17. Queen Tuya
4. Prince Khaemwaset
9. Queen Isetnofret
2. Hori, High Priest of Ptah
1. Hori II, Vizier
