= Hori I (High Priest of Ptah) =

Ancient Egyptian high priest

Hori
- High Priest of Ptah in Memphis
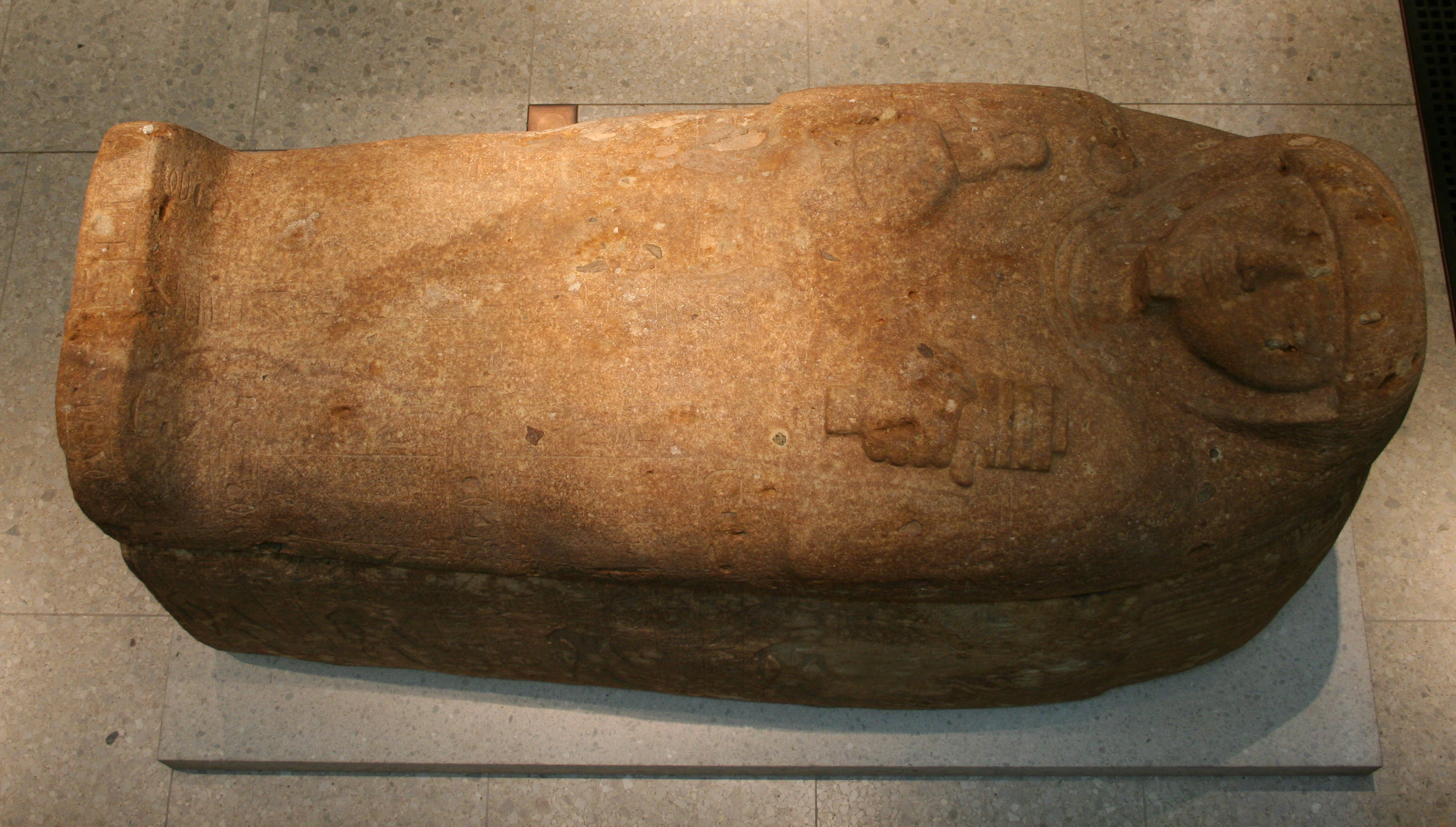
- Sarcophagus of Hori. Berlin, Ägyptisches Museum.
- Predecessor: Neferronpet
- Successor: Iyri
- Dynasty: 19th Dynasty
- Pharaoh: Ramesses II, Merenptah
- Father: Khaemwaset
- Children: Hori II (Vizier)
- Burial: Saqqara?

Hori was the High Priest of Ptah at the very end of the reign of Ramesses II. Hori succeeded Neferronpet in office.

Hori was a son of prince Khaemwaset and hence a grandson of Ramesses II. Hori had an older brother named Ramesses who had served as Sem priest of Ptah. It was Hori however who would eventually follow in his father's footsteps and become high priest. Hori also had a sister named Isetnofret. It is possible that Isetnofret married her uncle Merneptah and served as his queen. If so, Hori would have been both a nephew and a brother-in-law to pharaoh Merneptah, the thirteenth son and successor of Ramesses II.

Hori is attested on:

- A pillar originally from his tomb in Saqqara. Hori uses the titles Noble, Chief in charge of Both Lands, Sem Priest and High Priest. He is explicitly said to be the son of Khaemwaset.
- A stela (BM 167) from the Scribe of the Royal Harem named Ptahemwia.
