= QV71 =

Tomb of Princess-Queen Bintanath

- Burial site of Bintanath
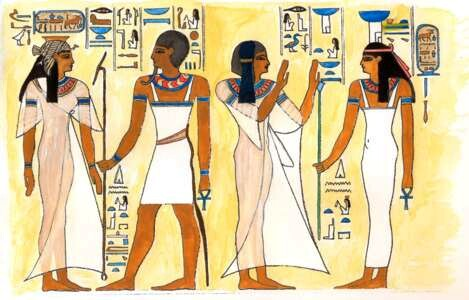
- Queen Bintanath before a god, and her daughter before the goddess Nephtys in QV71. (Drawing based on scene recorded by Lepsius).
- Location: Valley of the Queens
- Layout: Short corridor, a hall and inner room.
- ← Previous; QV70 Next → QV72

QV71 is the tomb of Bintanath, the daughter and Great Wife of Ramesses II, in Egypt's Valley of the Queens. It was mentioned by Champollion and Lepsius, and later excavated by Ernesto Schiaparelli (the director of the Egyptian Museum in Turin).

Lepsius gives a short description of this tomb. In his list this is tomb number 4.

== The tomb ==
The main hall contains several scenes with deities. Bintanath appears before Ptah-Sokar, Hathor, a ram-headed Anubis and cow-headed Hathor. The Princess-Queen is led by Hathor to the god Shu, and in another scene by Anubis to Osiris and Hathor.

Further scenes show the deceased offering to Khepri and Anubis, and offering an image of Maat to Ptah. In another scene is led by Thoth to appear before Ra and Isis.

In the Inner room Bintanath is shown adoring Nun and Serket, Further scenes show the deceased before Geb, and Ra. Bintanath is also shown with princess adoring the Anubis-jackal.

The sarcophagus and the lid were found. The sarcophagus is now in the Cairo Museum (JdE 47370). The sarcophagus appears to have been usurped from a man. The inscriptions now read:

Lid, center-line: Words spoken by the Osiris, King's Daughter Bint-Anath, He (sic) days: "Descend, O my mother Nut, spread yourself over me, and may I be place amidst the Imperishable Stars; not shall die, the Osiris
Round Foot: The Osiris, Hereditary Princess, greatly favored, Chief of the Harim, King's Daughter Bint-Anath
On Side: The Osiris, King's Wife, King's Daughter, Bint-Anath
