= Bintanath =

Ancient Egyptian princess and queen

- Queen consort of Egypt; Great Royal Wife; Lady of The Two Lands; Mistress of Upper and Lower Egypt, etc
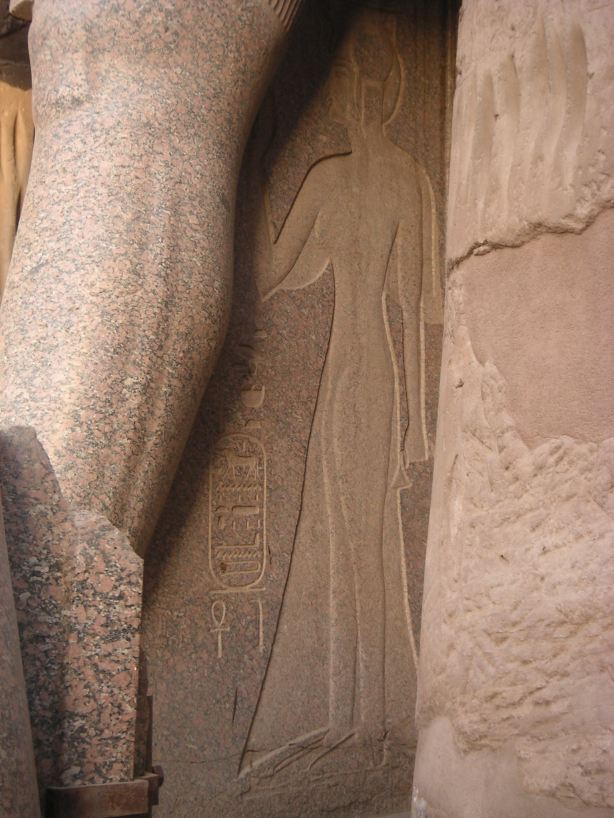
- Bintanath depicted in the side statue of Ramsses at Luxor
- Burial: QV71, Valley of the Queens, Thebes
- Spouse: Ramesses II
- Dynasty: 19th Dynasty of Egypt
- Father: Ramesses II
- Mother: Isetnofret
- Religion: Ancient Egyptian religion

Bintanath in hieroglyphs
E10 Z1 R7 N18 Z2 t R7 D36 n U33 i B1
Bintanath (In Tomb)
Daughter of Anath
E11 Z1 n Z2 a n U33 T
Bintanath (On stela)
Daughter of Anath

Bintanath (also Bentanath) was a daughter and later Great Royal Wife of the Egyptian Pharaoh Ramesses II, born by his second spouse Isetnofret.

== Family ==
Bintanath was likely born during the reign of her grandfather Seti I. Her mother was Isetnofret, one of the earliest wives that Ramesses II had during his time as crown prince. Her ranks first in three of the princess lists, while the other three are fragmentary, making it impossible to determine whether she ranked first in all of them. In fact, according to the remaining text, the princess ranked first in A1 is clearly not her. Her name is Semitic, meaning Daughter of Anath, referring to the Canaanite goddess Anath. (Note: Bintanath's name stands out uniquely among the names of royal children in ancient Egypt. The vast majority of the sons and daughters of Ramesses II bore theophoric names; with few exceptions, the names of royal sons were generally associated with male deities, while those of royal daughters were often linked to goddesses, and all of these names were in the Egyptian language. Although some of Ramesses II's younger sons also had names linked to Canaanite goddesses, such as Ramesses-Meryastarte, these names were essentially Egyptian as well. Bintanath's name, however, is purely Semitic. The masculine form of this name was also held, during the reign of Ramesses II, by a Syrian ship captain who was the father-in-law of the twenty-third prince, Simonthu. Bintanath's name perhaps reflects the fact that, in the New Kingdom, under normal circumstances, royal daughters were not expected to inherit the throne at all—unlike even the youngest princes, whose chances of succession, however remote, still existed. Although royal women held important religious and ceremonial status, they were not subject to the same royal naming conventions as potential pharaohs. Their names therefore allowed greater scope for personal, familial, and even cross-cultural expression. In any case, this does not indicate that she had Syrian ancestry: This naming simply reflected Ramesses' reverence for Asiatic deities. Anat had long been introduced into the eastern Delta of Egypt, the very region where the Nineteenth Dynasty royal family had risen to power. Moreover, Ramesses II called himself "the suckling of Anat" (mḥr ʿnt) which was also used to name one of his younger sons, Mahiranath, and other inscriptions refer to Anat as his mother; it is therefore only natural that he named his daughter Bintanath. The term bint can denote any female descendant, including a granddaughter. As for the Semitic form, which is strange for a member of the Egyptian royal family, it was Ramesses II's way of expressing the depth of his devotion to this foreign goddess: by sacrificing the indigenous character, conventionality, and everyday practicality of his eldest daughter's name, Ramesses II demonstrated the extraordinary degree of piety he was capable of showing toward the goddess Anat) She had at least three brothers, Ramesses, Khaemwaset and Merneptah, no full sisters. Princess Isetnofret has been considered by some scholars to be her full sister because of the name; however, in the New Kingdom, this name—praising the goddess Isis—was very common across all social classes, and women in artisan village families were often given this name. Moreover, Princess Isetnofret does not appear on either of the two family stelae, indicating that she was not her full sister.

Joyce Tyldesley once proposed that Bintanath had a daughter who was also named Bintanath, and she married the next pharaoh, Merneptah. According to Tyldesley, a statue of Merneptah in Luxor mentions "the Great Royal Wife Bintanath", who is, possibly, this daughter, since it is unlikely that the older Bintanath married Merneptah when both of them were well over sixty. However, it is entirely possible that Bintanath never married Merenptah and used the "Great Royal Wife" title only because she was entitled to it due to her first marriage.

According to the tomb paintings, Bintanath was once thought to have had a daughter. However, since McCarthy’s 2011 study of all the queens’ tombs of the Nineteenth and Twentieth Dynasties, this theory has been rejected. The “King’s Daughter” who appears in her tomb is more likely a manifestation of Bintanath’s own soul, much like how the Book of the Dead often depicts the same individual in different forms of age within a single scene.

== Life ==
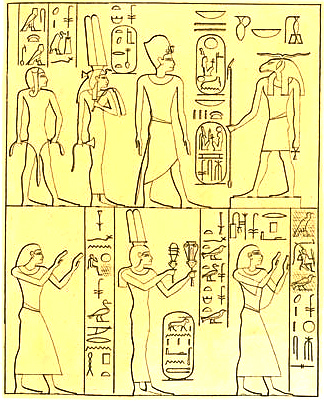
Aswan Rock stela. Top: Ramesses II, Isetnofret and Khaemwaset before Khnum. Bottom left to right: Merneptah, Bintanath and Prince Ramesses.

Bintanath is depicted in a scene on a pylon in Luxor dated to year 3 of Ramesses II. She is said to be the King's daughter of his body, and is the first in a procession of princesses. She is followed by Meritamen in this procession. Bintanath appears twice as a princess in Abu Simbel. Together with Nebettawy she flanks the southernmost colossus on the facade of the great temple. On one of the pillars inside the temple she is shown offering flowers to the goddess Anuqet.

Bentanath was first attested as the Great Royal Wife in the 30th year of her father's reign, having already had many years of experience as a Royal Wife before that. During her time as queen she held many titles including hereditary princess, the great first one (iryt-p`t-tpit-wrt), Lady of The Two Lands (nbt-t3wy), Great King’s Wife (hmt-niswt-wrt), Mistress of Upper and Lower Egypt (hnwt-Shm’w -mhw), King’s Daughter (s3t-niswt), and eventually King’s Sister (snt-niswt).

The pillars of the Great Temple at Abu Simbel provide the earliest evidence of Bintanath's role as the King's Wife. Since only Nefertari and Bintanath appear inside the Great Temple, with no representation of Queen Mother Tuya, it is possible that Bintanath assumed the ceremonial role originally belonging to the Queen Mother. A jar bearing a Year 22 inscription was unearthed from Queen Mother Tuya's tomb, which may have been produced before her death, though it is also possible that it was placed as a burial offering after her passing, representing the most recently produced wine. Queen Mother Tuya was quite active in the early reign of Ramesses II. During a pharaoh's rule, it was already a precedent for the King's Mother and the King's Wife to jointly fulfill the role of the pharaoh's ceremonial partner—as seen with Thutmose IV and his mother Tiaa. After Queen Mother Tuya could no longer perform her role as the pharaoh's ceremonial partner, the King's Daughter Bintanath may have taken over the role originally belonging to the Queen Mother, much like how the King's Daughter and King's Sister Iaret assumed the Queen Mother's role after the death of Queen Mother Tiaa. Meanwhile, Bintanath's sister Meritamen took over the role of her mother Nefertari after Nefertari's death. In the early reign of Ramesses II, Queen Nefertari consistently played a more significant role than Tuya in practice. For instance, when she appeared alongside Tuya at The Great Temple at Abu Simbel and the Ramesseum, she was always placed in a more prominent position than Tuya. Although Bintanath was older than Meritamen and was the king's eldest daughter, when she and Meritamen simultaneously served as royal ceremonial partner, Bintanath was always positioned behind Meritamen. This may have also influenced the arrangement of their tombs. Although their tombs were constructed simultaneously in the Valley of the Queens, Meritamen was allotted the tomb that was more prior in sequence.

In addition, during the clearance of debris near the tombs of Bintanath, Nefertari, and Tuya between 1985 and 1987, a number of funerary objects scattered by ancient robbers were unearthed, primarily ushabti—one of which belonged to Nefertari—along with various other ornaments. Among these was a perfume bottle fragment bearing the inscription “King’s Daughter, Great Royal Wife Bintanath.” This led some to claim that Bintanath had already become Great Royal Wife by the time of Tuya’s death. However, the perfume bottle fragment was not found inside Tuya’s tomb, as some asserted, but outside it. Although the findspot was not far from Tuya’s tomb, the tomb of Bintanath itself is only a few meters away from Tuya’s. Just as the ushabti of Nefertari originally belonged to Nefertari’s tomb, the perfume bottle of Bintanath likewise belonged to Bintanath’s tomb. At the time of Tuya’s death, Bintanath was at most Royal Wife, not Great Royal Wife.

Bentanath was Ramesses II’s eldest daughter, but she was not the eldest of all his children. She held the title Hereditary Princess, the Great First One (iryt-p‘t-tpit-wrt), a fully feminine title that denotes only the first among the king’s daughters. Nefertari’s eldest daughter, Meritamen, also held this title, indicating her status as the eldest by maternal line. On the second level of the Aswan Rock stela, Bentanath is depicted standing with her brothers, whose titles begin with “his (Khaemwaset’s) sister/brother,” revealing her position among her full siblings: the Prince Ramesses were the eldest, followed by her, and in fact, she may have even been younger than the king’s third son, Pareherwenemef.

As (great) royal wife Bintanath appears on several statues of Pharaoh Ramesses II. She is depicted on a statue from the Sinai (BM 697), on two sandstone colossi found in Tanis, but probably originally from Pi-Ramesse, and on a statue from the south gate of the Ptah precinct in Memphis. An usurped Middle Kingdom statue from Heracleopolis depicts both Bintanath and her sister Meritamen, and a statue from Hermopolis depicts Bintanath and Henutmire (both as great royal wives). Bintanath is depicted on statues of her father at least three times in Karnak and Luxor, and she appears in statues in Wadi es-Sebua.

Two family stelae show Bintanath with her immediate family. The Aswan rock stela shows Ramesses II, Isetnofret and Khaemwaset before the god Khnum, while in another register Bintanath appears with her brothers Ramesses and Merneptah. Another stela from West Silsila depicts Bint-Anath standing behind her mother Isetnofret and her father Ramesses II as the king offers Maat to the gods Ptah and Nefertem. Prince Khaemwaset stands in front of the king, while her brothers Ramesses and Merneptah are shown in a lower register.

== Death and burial ==
Despite her being Ramesses' first daughter, she was actually one of the few children who outlived their long-lived father. She was depicted on a statue usurped by Merenptah. She died during the reign of her brother Merneptah and was buried in the tomb QV71 in the Valley of the Queens.

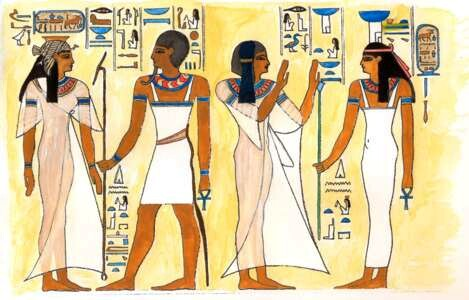
Queen Bintanath before a god, and “King’s Daughter” before the goddess Nephtys in QV71. (Drawing based on scene recorded by Lepsius).

The tomb is described by Lepsius (number 4). The name of Bintanath is given in slightly different spellings in the tomb. Bintanath is shown before Osiris and Nephthys. Both gods say: "I grant you a place of repose in the land of righteousness." Queen Bintanath is depicted together with a “King’s Daughter,” who is believed to be a manifestation of her own soul. Bintanath's sarcophagus was later usurped by a man.

== See also ==
- List of children of Ramesses II
