= Isitnofret =

Woman of the 18th Dynasty of Egypt

- Lady of the House; Singer of the Mistress of the Southern Ima-Tree
- Spouse: Probably Nemtimose
- Father: Probably Horemheb
- Children: Probably Nemtimose; Probably Isetnofret

Isitnofret, or more accurately Isetnofret or Isis-nofret, was a 'Lady of the House' (Note: that is, an adult woman in charge of a household, which is essentially a housewife) during the Eighteenth Dynasty of Ancient Egypt. She was also known as 'Singer of the Mistress of the Southern Ima-Tree' and was possibly a daughter of Horemheb, the last pharaoh of the 18th Dynasty of Egypt.

== Life ==
A stela of Isitnofret was unearthed in the Tomb of Horemheb in Saqqara, where she is referred to as the 'Osiris Isitnofret' and is shown worshiping Osiris and other Ancient Egyptian deities, depicting her in the afterlife. Another stela related to her was also discovered in Saqqara; the owner of this stela is Nemtimose, who is called 'Charioteer of His Majesty'. The exact relationship between the two is not specified; Isitnofret may have been Nemtimose’s wife or possibly his mother.

In both stelae, Isitnofret's hairstyle and clothing, are the same as those of princesses from the Eighteenth Dynasty, and the Ramesside period. which suggests that she may have been a royal daughter. In the stelae, her hairstyle is the "Sidelock of Youth." As ancient Egypt entered the New Kingdom period, the Sidelock of Youth became a distinctive symbol of royal children during the 18th Dynasty, carrying significant meaning. The association between this hairstyle and princesses was particularly emphasized. Since Isitnofret is depicted in the image not as a child (another group that typically wore the Sidelock of Youth), her identity is further confirmed as that of a royal daughter. Since one of her stelae was discovered in the Tomb of Horemheb, it is very likely that she was Horemheb’s daughter, born before he became Pharaoh, by his first wife, Amenia. If this is the case, she may have been the mother of Queen Isetnofret. Various pieces of evidence indicate that Queen Isetnofret had a familial relationship with Horemheb.

Therefore, she did not hold the title of "King's Daughter," because she was born the daughter of an official and married into a family of status equal to her own at the time—just as Tia, the daughter of Seti I, also never explicitly held the title "King's Daughter," and was referred to as "King's Sister" only during the reign of Ramesses II, even though she was unquestionably a king's daughter.

Isitnofret's confirmed titles are 'Lady of the House' and 'Singer of the Mistress of the Southern Ima-Tree'. The 'Mistress of the Ima-Tree' (nbt imꜣt) may have been the goddess Sekhmet.

== Tomb ==
In 2009, a team from Waseda University discovered at Saqqara the tomb of a royal descendant named Isetnofret. Because the tomb is associated with the tomb of Prince Khaemwaset, the Waseda team believed that this was precisely the tomb of Khaemwaset's daughter. However, according to Zahi Hawass's assessment, the tomb should date to an earlier period, more likely belonging to the Eighteenth Dynasty. If so, the tomb may belong to Isitnofret, Khaemwaset's possible maternal grandmother.
