= Hewernef =

Ancient Egyptian vizier

Herwernef
- Vizier of the South
- Dynasty: 20th Dynasty
- Pharaoh: Ramesses III

Hewernef could have been the name of a vizier of ancient Egypt, assumed to have served during the reign of Ramesses III. He was possibly appointed to the post in the 10th regnal year of Ramesses III and held the office until the 29th regnal year. However, this interpretation of a short hieratic text on an ostrakon (now in the National Archaeological Museum of Florence) is only a hypothesis.

In a partly different treatment of the Florence ostrakon, a vizier is recognized herein, though not given the personal name suggested by Wolterman.
