= Isetnofret (daughter of Khaemwaset) =

Isetnofret was an ancient Egyptian woman and daughter of the high priest of Ptah and king's son Khaemweset (lived around 1200 BC). She appears on two monuments close to her father. On a statue of Khaemweset found at Medinet Madi she is shown on the back pillar and called daughter of his body. On a relief found at Saqqara she is called his beloved daughter and king's daughter. Evidently she was not the daughter of a king, but was the granddaughter of king Ramses II, as Khaemweset was the son of the latter. Isetnofret was most likely buried at Saqqara close to a monument dedicated to Khaemweset. There, a tomb was discovered with a huge limestone sarcophagus that is inscribed for the noble woman Isetnofret. The place of the tomb next to the building dedicated to Khaemwaset, makes it very likely that this is the burial of his daughter Isetnofret.
