= Isetnofret =

Ancient Egyptian queen consort

- Queen consort of Egypt; Great Royal Wife
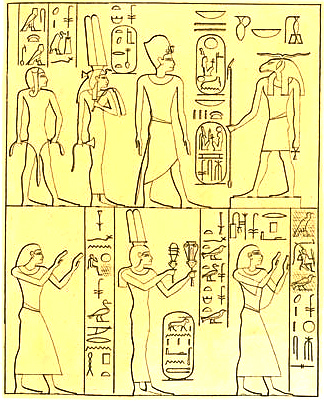
- Upper Register: King Ramesses II, Isetnofret and Khaemwaset before Khnum; Lower Register, left to right: Merneptah, Bintanath and Prince Ramesses.
- Burial: Saqqara ?
- Spouse: Ramesses II
- Issue: Ramesses; Bintanath; Khaemwaset; Merenptah; Isetnofret ?
Egyptian name
st t H8 nfr r&t
- Dynasty: 19th of Egypt
- Father: Nemtimose (?)
- Mother: Isitnofret (?)
- Religion: Ancient Egyptian religion

Isetnofret (or Isis-nofret or Isitnofret) (Ancient Egyptian: "the beautiful/good Isis" or "Isis is beautiful/good") was one of the Great Royal Wives of Pharaoh Ramesses II and was the mother of his successor, Merneptah. She may have become, around the same time as Nefertari, one of the many wives of Ramesses II before he was pharaoh (In the first year of his tenure as crown prince, Ramesses II was granted an entire harem by his father, Seti I). All evidence confirming Isetnofret's title of Chief Queen comes from after her death, suggesting that she was likely posthumously granted the title, around the 30th to 33rd/34th year of Ramesses II's reign.

== Family ==
The parents of Isetnofret are not known. There is substantial evidence suggesting that she had blood relationship with Pharaoh Horemheb. (Note: It was primarily based on the ushabti of Bintanath, the eldest daughter of Isetnofret, which was discovered in the tomb of Horemheb at Saqqara. This was a tomb Horemheb had prepared for himself before he became pharaoh, where his original wife Amenia and his Great Royal Wife Mutnedjmet were both buried. Additionally, the second family stela of Khaemwaset—the one depicting Isetnofret as a deceased figure—is located at the Temple of Horemheb in Silsila. After Merenptah ascended the throne, he also commissioned an important new stela at this site) She is believed to have originated from Memphis and may have been closely related to Tanedjemet, the wife of Seti I and daughter of Horemheb. A block from Horemheb's tomb at Saqqara depicts an "Isetnofret" dressed as a princess. In Saqqara, this "Isetnofret" also appears on a block belonging to a male officer, bearing the title "Mistress of the House." She may have been a daughter born to Horemheb before he became pharaoh, who later married the officer and gave birth to the Isetnofret who eventually married Ramesses II. She must have married Ramesses II even before he came to the throne as her three children were born during the reign of Seti I. She had at least three sons and one daughter. Her children include:

- Prince Ramesses, Crown Prince from the death of Amunherkhepeshef(the specifics remain disputed) to Year 52 of Ramesses II
- Princess-Queen Bintanath, firstborn daughter and later wife of Ramesses
- Prince Khaemwaset, High Priest of Ptah. Crown Prince from Year 53 to 55 of Ramesses II
- Pharaoh Merneptah, Ramesses' 13th son and ultimate successor (he outlived the first 12 princes)
- Princess Isetnofret (?), possible wife of Merenptah as Isetnofret II, However, although this view has been proposed, the theory has been refuted by other scholars. Merneptah's wives never held the titles of "King's Daughter" or "King's Sister," and his age makes it impossible for him to have married his older sisters. When Merneptah was young, he was not considered the heir to the throne, and princesses would only marry the pharaoh himself or the crown prince.

Prince Sethi and Princess Nebettawy have been suggested as further children of Isetnofret, but they are more likely to be the children of Nefertari (or even some other mother).

== Titles ==
Queen Isetnofret's titles include: Hereditary Princess (iryt-p't), Great of Praises (wrt-hzwt), King's Mother (mwt-niswt), Mistress of the entire Two Lands (hnwt-t3wy-tm), King's Wife (hmt-nisw), Great King's Wife (hmt-niswt-wrt)

Of these, only the title "King's Wife" can be definitively attested during her lifetime. While monuments depicting Isetnofret as "Great King's Wife" are known, these monuments were all produced by her sons, and not by the pharaoh himself, and their chronological position is uncertain and may have been accorded posthumously. In the reign of her son, Merneptah, the titles "Hereditary Princess," "Great of Praises," "King's Mother," and "Mistress of the Entire Two Lands" were all conferred upon her in a relief at the foot of a statue of the king.

== Life ==
Isetnofret is known from several inscriptions and small statues. Before the 30th year of Ramesses II's reign, the only clear evidence of her existence is the existence of her children themselves. In fact, she never appears in Ramesses II's constructions and is only attested through the monuments of her sons and her own funerary equipment.

Monuments that mention Isetnofret:

- Isetnofret is shown on a family stela from Aswan. The upper register shows Ramesses II, Isetnofret and Khaemwaset before the god Khnum. The lower register shows Prince Ramesses, Merneptah and Princess Queen Bintanath. The stela was created by and centers on Khaemwaset, with the titles of the princes and princesses beginning respectively with "his brother", "his sister", and "his younger brother". The stela is believed to have been created after the 30th year of Ramesses II's reign, but before his 33rd/34th year. At this time, Isetnofret was undoubtedly still alive, her eldest son had already become crown prince, and her eldest daughter had attained the title of Great King's Wife. Yet Isetnofret is referred to only as "King's Wife." Some scholars argue that this may be due to limited space for a longer inscription, as a Great King's Wife was often simply called "King's Wife." However, there is sufficient blank space before Isetnofret’s head and before her legs, and on the stela at Silsila, Bintanath's title demonstrates a compact form of "Great King's Wife," occupying a space equivalent to that of "King's Wife." Moreover, in cases where both mother and daughter held the title of Great King's Wife—such as Tiye and Sitamun, or Nefertari and the daughters of Ramesses II—when their names appear together, the mother's name always retains the title Great King's Wife, while the daughter is referred to as King's Wife or by another designation. (Note: In the Turin Papyrus, among the listed queens of Ramesses II, Nefertari, who is placed at the very forefront, is referred to as the "Great King's Wife," while the other queens are all labeled as "King's Daughter, King's Wife" or "King's Daughter and Wife." In the case of Sitamun, daughter of Amenhotep III, although she and her mother both held the title of Great King's Wife, they were almost never depicted together in imagery. In textual records, Queen Sitamun is often mentioned alongside her birth mother, for example: "King's Daughter, King's Wife, Sitamun, born to the Great King's Wife, Tiye, may she live and stay stable like Re forever." Although they were frequently both titled as "King's Wife," such as in "King's Daughter and Wife, Sitamun, born to the King's Wife, Tiye," they were never simultaneously referred to as "Great King's Wife." Nor was there ever a case where Sitamun was called "Great King's Wife" while Tiye was merely called "King's Wife." On a knob where the cartouches of Amenhotep III, Tiye, and Sitamun are all mentioned together, although the three cartouches are arranged side by side and both mother and daughter are titled "King's Wife," the names of the royal couple and Sitamun's name face each other, as if Sitamun is paying homage to her parents. This indicates that traditionally, although a mother and daughter might both be queens, the significance of this title differed for them; the princess-queen was an additional element to the royal couple, rather than a counterpart to her mother. However, the case of Isetnofret and her daughter Bintanath is entirely different) In contrast, Isetnofret's stela presents the opposite situation, which more likely indicates that she had not yet acquired the title of Great King's Wife at that time.
- A family stela from the Speos at West Silsila shows Ramesses II, Isetnofret and Bintanath with a much smaller Khaemwaset before the gods Ptah and Nefertem. The lower register shows Prince Ramesses and Prince (later Pharaoh) Merenptah. The stela was created by and centers on Khaemwaset. On this stela, Isetnofret is depicted as a woman holding the Ankh symbol, which may indicate that she had already died at the time of its creation. Here, like her daughter, she is shown holding the title of Great King's Wife. However, Bintanath here holds a richer and more important set of titles.
- A Statue with Prince's Figure (Brussels E.7500). Her son is named on the statue: the Sem-Priest and King's Son Khaemwaset. This is Khaemwaset's work. The reverse side records Isetnofret participating in the worship of Sekhmet and Ptah (with Néséret/Nesret being another name for Sekhmet). Here, only her title of King's Wife can be confirmed: "...the Horus, master of the palace, she who fills the audience hall with her mere fragrance. Her scents are like those of Punt when its limbs are anointed (?), the Royal Wife [...].[...] the sanctuary of Néséret, her perfection envelops the private chambers, the audience hall is under the influence of her pleasant perfumes, beside her father who rejoices at seeing her, the Royal Wife [...]." (Note: The titles here point to a cultic context, just as in the annual re-enactment of the embalming of Osiris, the female wailers who impersonated Isis and Nephthys would say: "Ah! I have washed my mouth, I have chewed natron, I have fumigated myself with burning incense. I am pure, clean, and censed, with natron that has come from El-Kâb, with incense that has come from Punt, the sweet perfume that has come from the eye of Horus..." Egyptian priestesses had to purify themselves by bathing before taking part in temple services, though in other circumstances they might not need, like the priestesses who played Isis and Nephthys, to purify themselves "four times for seven days to seven days" and to remove all hair from their bodies) However, this statue appears to be a commemorative work by her son Khaemwaset after Isetnofret's death, because it bears Khaemwaset's title of Iunmutef-priest,a title that was first granted to him appears on the family stela of Khaemwaset, at which time Isetnofret was already in her later years.
- A Statue group with Sons (Louvre 2272): A "hetep-di-nesu" offering for the King's Son, Sem priest of Ptah, Khaemwaset and the royal scribe, Generalissimo and King's Son Ramesses. The text mentions Queen Isetnofret (the princes' mother). Referring to Khaemwaset's speech at his mother's funeral, the inscription indicates that Isetnofret held the title of Great King's Wife during the ceremony and that she was buried at Saqqara in Memphis rather than in Thebes:"May the king make Sokar-Osiris, master of Ânkh-Taouy(Another name for Memphis), satisfied in the repose of the necropolis of the Beautiful West in Hout-ka-khénem-nétjérou, which conceals the body after the time of life and gathers the limbs for eternity. The royal son, the Sem priest of Ptah, Khaemwaset, true of voice, says: 'May you live as Sothis, Great Royal Wife Isetnofret. May you be chosen (?) in the sky among the stars. May you complete Orion opposite Khepri as a single star on the thighs of Nut, Osiris Isetnofret, living as the manifestation of Him who is protected in Busiris.' The royal scribe and great general, the royal son Ramses, true of voice."
- Isetnofret is also mentioned at the Serapeum, on a block discovered in 1986 among others bearing the names of Ramesses II and Khaemwaset. This block depicts offerings being presented by the genii of two nomes, accompanied by the repeated mention of "the King's Wife Isetnofret." The relief was likely part of the base of a local sanctuary that displayed all the nomes bringing their offerings. The queen's mention in place of the king suggests that, during her lifetime, she had been involved in the management of this sanctuary, which would make sense if she were indeed of Memphite origin. Moreover, after the 30th year of Ramesses II's reign, Khaemwaset became the administrator of the Serapeum, and his name also appears on similar blocks depicting the nomes presenting offerings, his mother may have been able to step out of the harem to assist him in his duties. However, the hypothesis that this could demonstrate Isetnofret's active religious participation is not very plausible, because these blocks recording Khaemwaset and Isetnofret more likely derive from a tomb near the temple; according to the reconstruction, they originally belonged to a funerary chapel of Khaemwaset in the Saqqara necropolis, or at least to some memorial monument of the prince in that area. The two private geographical procession blocks of the queen and the prince either belonged to one and the same geographical procession, with their names decorating the sections relating to Upper and Lower Egypt respectively, or they were two twin geographical processions constructed according to the same criteria, belonging to the same memorial monument of Khaemwaset. The imagery on the blocks conveys the same information as almost all other monuments related to Isetnofret: Khaemwaset actively incorporated his mother into his own commemorative and posthumous ritual system and attempted to construct a commemorative family grouping centered on Ramesses II, Isetnofret, and himself, most likely in the service of his own political or religious ambitions. At this point Isetnofret must have long been deceased; she is here called only "King's Wife," which may seem incongruous with other monuments that Khaemwaset produced after her death, but Khaemwaset's own private geographical procession likewise records only his title "King's Son" and not the sem-priest title he most frequently used. These two most basic titles both define them solely through their relationship to the king, without any additional elements.
- A naophorous Statue of Prince Khaemwaset mentions his mother. On the dorsal pillar it reads: "Iunmutef-priest, born of the Great Royal Wife Isetnofret, the Sem-priest of Ptah Khaemwaset." This was created during the later period of Ramesses II's reign.
- Relief for offering for Prince Khaemwaset in Horemheb's Speos. The text above the prince reads: "Sitting at table, making purification with natron and reading out the (funerary) menu, every good offering, for the King's Son of Usermaatre Setepenre, born of the Great Royal Wife, Isetnofret, the Sem-priest Khaemwaset." This was created during the later period of Ramesses II's reign.
- Shabtis from Middle cemetery of Abydos: One of these has a cartouche of Queen Isetnofret.
- At a Ramesses II-era tomb site near the Saint-Jeremiah monastery in Saqqara, Memphis, two stelae believed to be funerary equipment of Isetnofret were unearthed, each bearing her name. One of the stelae depicts the queen standing between two now-lost deities, wearing a tall feathered crown, holding a floral scepter in one hand, while the object in her other hand is damaged. An accompanying inscription refers to her as "Mistress of Upper and Lower Egypt" and "Great Royal Wife," indicating that this is her posthumous image. This provides the clearest evidence to date and suggests that, perhaps one day, Isetnofret's tomb may be discovered in the Saqqara region.
- Like her daughter Bintanath, Isetnofret is mentioned during the reign of Merenptah; she is inscribed on the side of the dorsal pillar of one of Merenptah's standard-bearing statues, in which Merenptah grants her a long series of titles: "Hereditary Princess, Great of Praises, Mistress of the entire Two Lands, King's Wife, King's Mother, Isetnofret."

Monuments possibly attributable to Isetnofret:

- The Head of a Statue (Brussels E.5924): On right shoulder the name of Isetnofret appears. However, there are no titles on it, and no clues that would rule out the possibility that it refers to Merneptah's wife of the same name.

Monuments formerly misattributed to Isetnofret:

- West Silsila: Rock shrine of Merneptah. A scene depicts Pharaoh, Queen Isetnofret with sistra before Taweret (as a hippopotamus), Thoth and Nut. However, the individuals depicted here are actually Merneptah and his wife. The pharaoh is Merneptah, and the queen named Isetnofret does not bear the title of King's Mother. Moreover, in the first year of Merneptah’s reign, Isetnofret had already been deceased for several decades. This stela commemorates the pharaoh’s celebration of the Nile festival in honor of the gods, with no indication that the royal woman depicted was a deceased person. It would be extremely bizarre for a deceased individual to be imagined as participating in such an important state ritual, offering to the gods, and being portrayed on an official commemorative stela. Merneptah was not without a Great Royal Wife, his Great Royal Wife was the mother of his crown prince. The queen Isetnofret here is, in fact, his wife rather than his mother. Although Porter and Moss labeled the queen on the stela as a wife of Ramesses II in the index to their work, according to Janssen, Moss acknowledged in a private letter that the queen was in fact a wife of Merenptah.
- A potsherd discovered in the Valley of the Kings mentions the "Isetnofret" tomb under construction, describing it as located 200 cubits from the tomb of Meryatum, the youngest son of Nefertari and the Greatest of Seers. However, for Queen Isetnofret, this potsherd is too late in date, and it lacks any titles; the name "Isetnofret" is not enclosed in a cartouche. This suggests that it more likely refers to a princess or a female descendant of Ramesses II bearing the same name, rather than the queen herself.

A daughter of her son Khaemwaset (sometimes called Isetnofret III) was named after her. It is possible that this Isetnofret was Merenptah's wife, not her aunt Isetnofret II. A possible daughter of Merneptah also bears this name.

In private monuments, Isetnofret is attested in both Upper and Lower Egypt. Her two most notable records, namely the family stelae of Khaemwaset, are located at Aswan and Silsila in Upper Egypt, while funerary-related records and other mentions concerning her and her sons are found at Memphis in Lower Egypt. However, she did not appear in any of Ramesses II's official monuments. Given the complete absence of Isetnofret from the official artistic program of Ramesses II, any specific interpretation of a singular omission—such as attempting to explain her absence from the Great Temple of Abu Simbel or from the official art related to Ramesses II’s Sed festival—is rendered meaningless, as she is in no instance mentioned by her husband, the pharaoh. Besides that, she was also not buried in the Valley of the Queens, but rather in a local tomb at Saqqara. Although her son became pharaoh, she does not appear on the royal ancestor lists of the Ramesside period, and there is no evidence that she held the title of Great King's Wife during her lifetime, despite assertions by some scholars. All evidence indicates that Isetnofret was simply an ordinary King's Wife. She was respected due to her possible confirmed familial connection to Pharaoh Horemheb and as the mother of several older princes and princesses. (Note: These factors contribute to ensuring that a royal wife is respected, yet they may not necessarily aid her political career. Since the position of "Great Royal Wife" was an immensely significant political and religious role, pharaohs tended to carefully select someone they trusted for this position. For instance, although Queen Mutnofret was the daughter of Ahmose I and the sister of Amenhotep I, it was she who directly connected her husband Thutmose II's reign to his predecessor, as Thutmose II was not of princely birth. Additionally, she was the mother of the crown prince and other princes. She was highly respected, and her name was inscribed in a cartouche. Yet, the Great Royal Wife of Thutmose II was his own sister, Ahmose) (Note: It has been proposed that Isetnofret was important in Lower Egypt and Nefertari was important in Upper Egypt, with the evidence being that they appear only in Upper Egypt and Lower Egypt respectively and never appear together. But this evidence is itself mistaken. Nefertari had significant monuments at Pi-Ramesses, Memphis, Giza, Heliopolis, and Bubastis. In particular, at the temple of Pi-Ramesses, cartouche stamp seals relating to her have been found; these seals belonged to the city's everyday administrative, sealing, and supply management system, indicating that her status as queen entered the administrative environment of Pi-Ramesses itself. As for Isetnofret, her status as Great Royal Wife can only be demonstrated in the thirties of the king's reign, after her death, in the records and funerary goods of her son. All of her attestations everywhere are dependent on the private records of her son, especially Khaemwaset. She indeed does not appear in Thebes, but this is clearly not because Thebes was Nefertari's domain—as "Mistress of All Lands," Nefertari's domain was conceptually the whole world and, in reality, the entire territory of Egypt—but because where Isetnofret appears mainly depended on when and where Khaemwaset decided to include his mother in his own monuments. It is certainly possible that there were private monuments in Lower Egypt connected with Isetnofret, and they may not have been insignificant, but the true owner of such monuments would most likely only have been Khaemwaset. The records of Nefertari are overwhelmingly official records; Isetnofret, who was never included in official monuments, could not have appeared in monuments associated with her, and there is no reason for Nefertari to appear in monuments made by Khaemwaset or in Isetnofret's funerary items. The attempt to elevate Isetnofret's status to Nefertari's sphere probably stems from the mistaken assumption that a Great Royal Wife ought to have had a status like Nefertari's. But Nefertari's status was transcendent, whereas Isetnofret's status, evidently, after the deaths of Nefertari and Amunherkhepeshef, as the mother of the then crown prince, then Great Royal Wife, and then High Priest of Ptah, was the most important among all the king's wives. Yet her status was important only relative to the king's other wives. Her sphere never extended beyond her own small household and the circle of women in the harem, while at that time true Queenship was held by the princess-queens. They were not wives in the true sense, but at this time only they could be called "queen" in the modern sense. For details, see Obsomer 2011; on Nefertari, see Nefertari.) That she has emerged from historical obscurity to be known to modern audiences is entirely thanks to her son, especially Khaemwaset. As the Belgian Egyptologist Claude Obsomer note:

One will note the ankh sign held by Queen Isetnofret on the stela of Gebel Silsileh, which suggests that her death had occurred some time before year 33/34. Adding to this the fact that the Brussels statue and the Aswan graffito grant her only the title of "Royal Wife," one may wonder whether Isetnofret truly was "Great Royal Wife" during Nefertari’s lifetime, or whether this title was conferred on her only after Nefertari’s death, or even after her own death, in a purely honorific manner. The third hypothesis seems to me the most likely. This makes it easier to understand the subdued role played by Isetnofret throughout her life, while the only "Great Royal Wife" was Nefertari, followed by her own daughter Bintanath. As for the succession to the throne, the choice of Ramesses as heir presumptive, after the death of the eldest son Amun-her-khepeshef, can thus be explained by the simple respect for the order of birth of the royal sons, independently of their mother’s status as "Great Royal Wife." There is no need to imagine a rivalry between the two queens or between their sons, if matters were clear from the outset and guaranteed by the authority of the king. Once they had attained important positions, succeeding one another as heir to the throne, the three sons of Isetnofret could only have rejoiced at thus occupying the forefront of the scene, while their mother had been content to remain modestly in the shadow of Nefertari, like other anonymous royal wives. It is their monuments that today allow us to know her name. On several objects bearing the name of Khaemwaset, she is mentioned in the prince’s maternal filiation formula: "he whom the Great Royal Wife Isetnofret bore."
