= Ramesses (prince) =

Ancient Egyptian crown prince during the 19th Dynasty

- Prince of Egypt
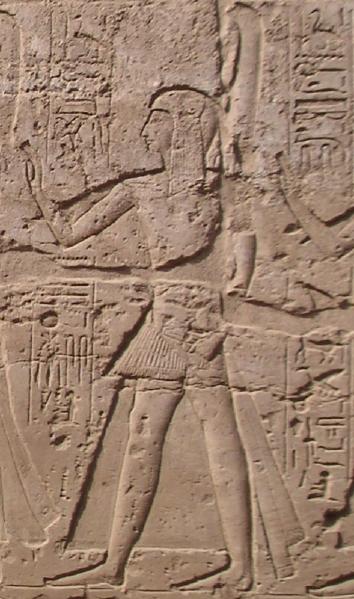
- Prince Ramesses at Luxor
- Burial: KV5, Thebes
Egyptian name
N5 Z1 ms s s A51
- Dynasty: 19th dynasty
- Father: Ramesses II
- Mother: Isetnofret

Ramesses (sometimes referred as Ramesses B) was an ancient Egyptian crown prince during the 19th Dynasty.

== Family ==
Ramesses was the eldest son of Ramesses II and Queen Isetnofret, and the second son overall after Amunherkhepeshef, the eldest son of the Great Royal Wife Nefertari. Born during the reign of his grandfather Seti I, he had at least one sister and two brothers. His sister Bintanath was elevated to the position of Great Royal Wife later in the reign of Ramesses II and played an important role at court. A possible sister named Isetnofret may have married her brother Merneptah and been his queen, however, it is possible that Merneptah's queen was his niece, not his sister. It is also possible that she was the daughter of his vizier. His known younger brothers are Khaemwaset and Merneptah. Ramesses is listed on several monuments with his younger brothers Khaemwaset and Merenptah. He appears as the second prince in the list of procession of Ramesses' sons in Luxor and Abu Simbel.

== Life ==
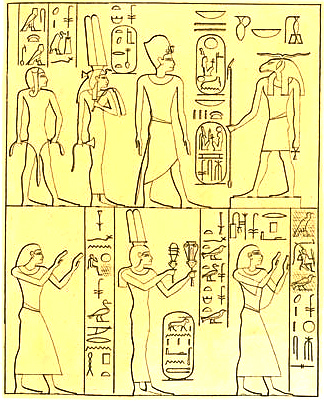
Aswan Rockstela. Top: Ramesses II, Isetnofret and Khaemwaset before Khnum. Bottom left to right: Merneptah, Bintanath and Prince Ramesses

He is attested in numerous inscriptions including the Egyptian 'triumph' scenes after the Battle of Kadesh. In these scenes, several of Ramesses II's elder sons are usually depicted. Ramesses bears the titles of Royal scribe, Generalissimo and "bodily King's Son beloved of him", and is shown presenting the "Maryannu-warriors of the despicable Naharina" to the gods as spoils of war. In scenes from the battle of Qode in year 10 at Luxor, the princes Amunherkhepeshef, Ramesses, Pareherwenemef and Khaemwaset are shown leading prisoners before their father the king.

Although Ramesses’ military honors were not as distinguished as those of the third prince, Pareherwenemef, he nevertheless achieved great distinction in the military. Unlike Crown Prince Amunherkhepeshef—who was the focus of special expectations and frequently depicted symbolically in battle scenes but is thought rarely to have actually participated in combat—Ramesses, together with other elder princes, actively demonstrated their abilities in military affairs.

Ramesses is depicted as just one of two princes depicted by the colossi of Ramesses II in front of the Great Temple at Abu Simbel. He appears in front of the colossus to the north of the entrance. Prince Ramesses is said to be the Royal Scribe and first Generalissimo of His Majesty, Bodily King's Son (of his body).

Ramesses served as the heir to the Egyptian throne from the death of Amunherkhepeshef(the specifics remain disputed) to year 52 of his father's reign.

After the war years came to an end, Prince Ramesses II disappeared from official art. He no longer appeared in the pharaoh's artistic works. Of particular note is that in the official depictions of the Sed festivals held in the pharaoh's 30th, 37th, and 40th regnal years, only the pharaoh and Khaemwaset are shown, with no sign of Ramesses, despite his position as crown prince at the time. From that point on, his existence is attested almost entirely through the works of his brother Khaemwaset. Information about his title as crown prince and the time of his death both derive from Khaemwaset's records.

He has also attested in Saqqara. He must have participated in some of the ceremonies for the Apis bulls, when his brother Khaemwaset was first sem-priest of Ptah and later High Priest of Ptah in Memphis. The King's Son and Generalissimo Ramesses donated a votive statue for one of the Apis burials sometime between years 16 and 30 of his father's reign.

Prince Ramesses is depicted in Aswan on a royal family stela dating to years 30 of his father's reign, and on a family stela from the Speos of Horemheb at Silsila dating to years 33/34 of Ramesses II reign, On these stelae he is accompanied by his parents and his brothers and sister. The family stela attests that he was the eldest son on his mother's side, especially in Aswan, where he is arranged by age alongside his sister Bintanath and his brother Merneptah, with their titles all beginning with “his(Khaemwaset) brother/sister.”

Prince Ramesses and Khaemwaset together appear on a statue group with their mother Queen Isetnofret which is now in the Louvre (Louvre 2272). The inscription indicates that this statue was also made by Khaemwaset.

== Death and burial ==
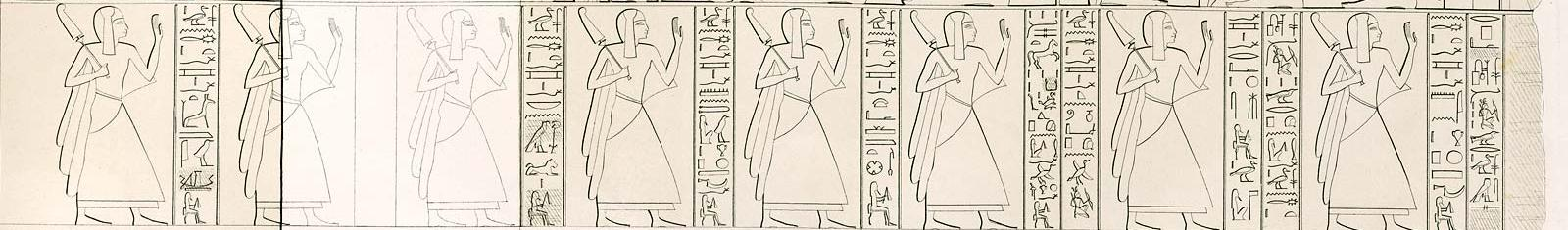
Sons of Pharaoh Ramesses II at the Sebua Temple. From right to left: Amunherkhepeshef, Ramesses, Pareherwenemef, Khaemwaset, Montuherkhepeshef, Nebenkharu, [Meryamun,] Sethemwia

After his death around year 52 of Ramesses II, he was buried in Tomb KV5 in the Valley of the Kings. In the 53rd year of Ramesses II's reign, records indicate that inspections were carried out on the tombs of the princes, including his own.

His full brother Khaemwaset succeeded him to become Egypt's new crown-prince in his place. Khaemwaset was the fourth son of Ramesses II; the third, Pareherwenemef died earlier.

== See also ==
- List of children of Ramesses II
