= Isetnofret II =

- Great Royal Wife; Lady of The Two Lands; Mistress of Upper and Lower Egypt; Queen consort of Egypt
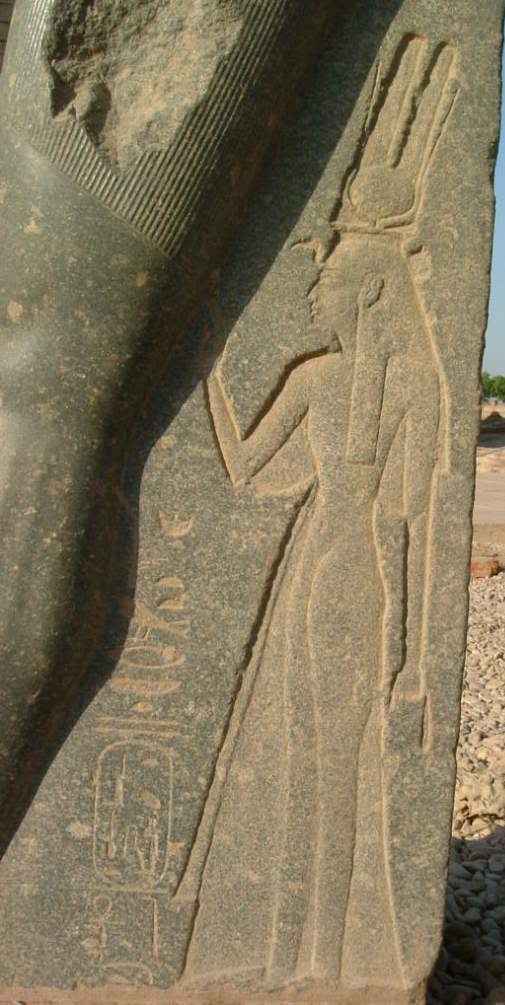
- Isetnofret II
- Spouse: Merenptah
- Issue: Seti II; Merenptah; Khaemwaset; Isetnofret
Egyptian name
st t H8 nfr r&t
- Dynasty: Nineteenth of Egypt
- Father: Ramesses II or Khaemwaset
- Religion: Ancient Egyptian religion

Isetnofret (or Isis-nofret or Isitnofret) (Ancient Egyptian: "the beautiful Isis") was a royal woman of Ancient Egypt and, as the Great Royal Wife of Pharaoh Merenptah, she became Isetnofret II.

== Family ==
The name Isetnofret II is identical to that of a daughter of Prince Khaemwaset, and also to that of a daughter of Ramesses II, which has led some scholars to believe that she was one of these two Isetnofrets.

However, Isetnofret II never held the titles of King's Daughter or King's Sister. Moreover, during the New Kingdom, princesses generally did not marry unless their husband was the pharaoh or the crown prince. At the time when Merneptah was of marriageable age, he was not the crown prince; it was only towards the very end of Ramesses II's reign that he could possibly have married his own sister. Yet by then, the pharaoh's sixth daughter would no longer have been suitable for childbearing. Even leaving this point aside, chronologically it is highly unlikely that Merneptah's eldest son would have been born so late, and Isetnofret II was the mother of Merneptah's eldest son.

The daughter of the pharaoh's fourth son and the pharaoh's thirteenth son may not have been far apart in age. On a stela, Isetnofret II is depicted wearing the Lock of Horus (Side-lock of youth), which is a characteristic of children in ancient Egypt. In the case of adults, apart from specific religious contexts, only royal children were depicted with this hairstyle, at least during that period. Thus, Isetnofret II must have been at least a royal granddaughter, just as Tausret is also depicted with this hairstyle in her tomb.

Three monuments indicate that the vizier Panehesy enjoyed a particularly close relationship with the royal couple and had some blood tie to the queen. If this is indeed so, he may have been the maternal grandfather of Isetnofret II, that is, the father-in-law of Khaemwaset.

Her children include:

- Seti Merenptah, who assume the throne as Seti II
- Merenptah, King's son, Executive at the Head of the Two Lands, and Generalissimo
- Khaemwaset, King's son, Depicted in Karnak Temple
- Isetnofret, King's daughter mentioned in the Leiden ship log

== Titles ==
The titles of Isetnofret II include: Lady of The Two Lands (nbt-t3wy), Great King’s Wife (hmt-niswt-wrt), Mistress of Upper and Lower Egypt (hnwt-Shm’w -mhw), King’s Wife (hmt-nisw).

== Life ==
Isetnofret II grew up during the reign of Ramesses II, her possible grandfather. If she was the daughter of Khaemwaset, she may have grown up in Memphis.

Isetnofret II is attested several times during the reign of her husband:

- She is depicted on a statue usurped from Amenhotep III by Merenptah.
- A stela of the Vizier Panehesy at Gebel el Silsila also depicts her. This stela is situated across the Chapel of Panehesy and depicts Merneptah, Queen Isetnofret, Sety-Merneptah, and the vizier, before Amun-Re and Ptah.
- Another stela situated in the Gallery of the Speos of Horemheb at Gebel el Silsila depicts Merenptah followed by Queen Isetnofret and the vizier Panehesy as they offer an image of the goddess Ma'at to Amen-Re and Mut.
- A statuette dedicated by the Vizier Panehesy at Gebel el Silsila also depicts her.

It is not known when or where Isetnofret II died or where she was buried. If Isetnofret was the daughter of Khaemwaset, she may have been buried at Saqqara. The tomb of a royal lady named Isetnofret was discovered in Saqqara during 2009 excavations by Waseda University. However, this tomb was probably never actually used. It was prepared for Isetnofret II by Khaemwaset when she was merely the daughter of a prince or the wife of another prince, and once she became queen, at the very least, the coffin that originally bore only the title "noblewoman" was no longer suitable for her.

== See also ==
- List of children of Ramesses II
