= Merenptah (prince) =

V28 Q3 X1 U6 N35 A1
Merenptah
in hieroglyphs
Era: New Kingdom
(1550–1069 BC)

Merenptah was an ancient Egyptian prince during the 19th Dynasty, and was likely a son of Pharaoh Merenptah (reigned 1213-1203 BCE).

He is known from two statues of Senusret I usurped by Pharaoh Merenptah − found in Tanis and Alexandria, respectively − and from three statue fragments from Bubastis. Since he shares a name with Pharaoh Merenptah, and his name is similar to that of the crown prince and eventual successor, Seti Merenptah, and he wears an uraeus usually worn by pharaohs only. It is a possibility that he is in fact the same as either of these two. However, Prince Merenptah's titles slightly differ from those of the pharaoh and the crown prince, and the Senusret statues were usurped by Merenptah when he was already a pharaoh. Also, Seti Merenptah used both his names as a prince and as a pharaoh. It is possible that Merenptah's use of a uraeus stems from the power struggle between Pharaoh Merenptah's heirs following his death.
