= Merneptah =

Pharaoh of Egypt from 1213 to 1203 BC

- Merenptah
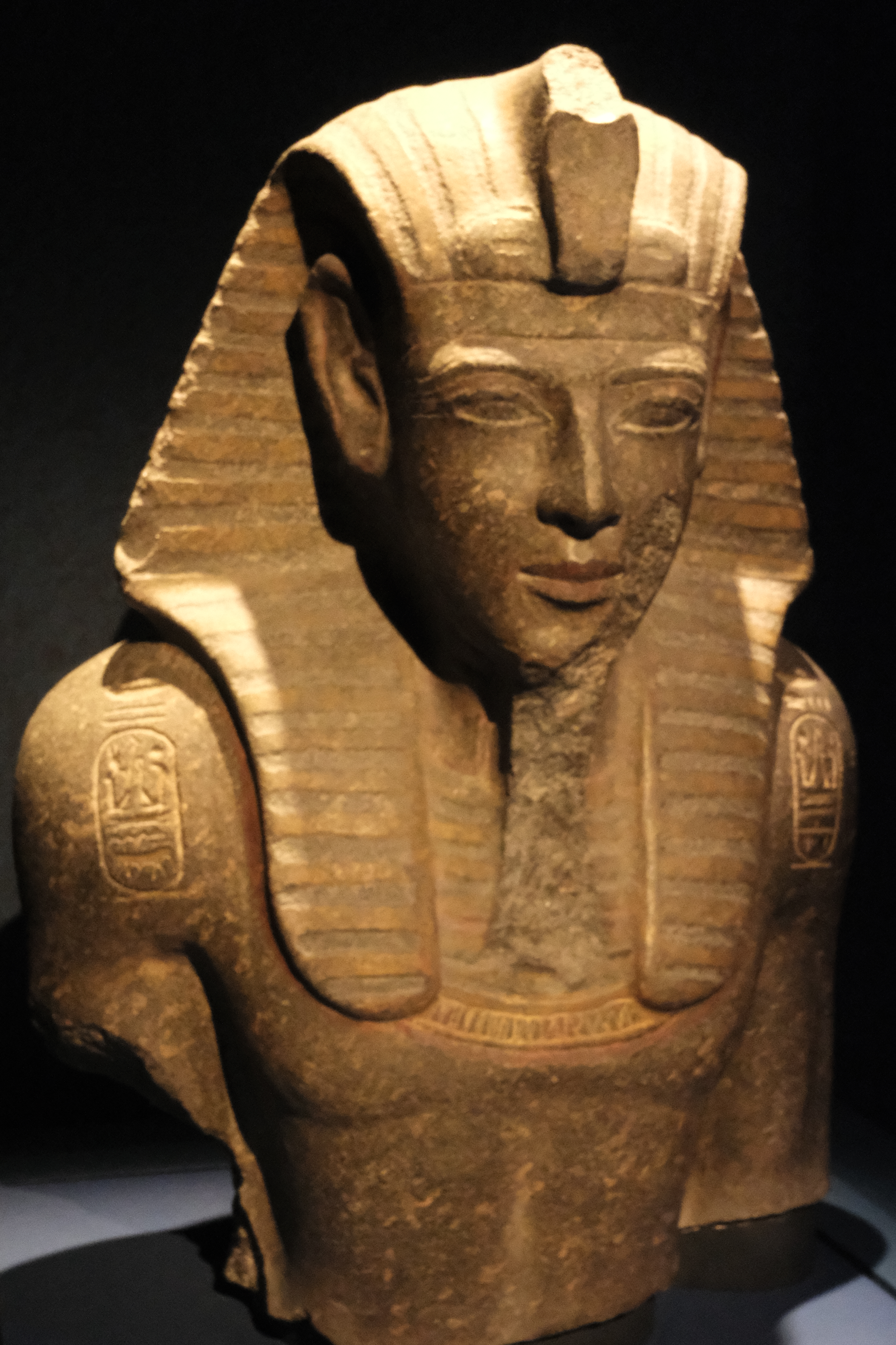
- Granodiorite bust of Merneptah, Egyptian Museum, Cairo

Pharaoh
- Reign: 10 regnal years 1213 BC–1203 BC
- Predecessor: Ramesses II
- Successor: Seti II/Amenmesse
Royal titulary
Horus name
Kanakht Haiemmaat
The strong bull who rejoiced in Truth
G5	E1 D40 V28 D36 A28 G17 M17
Nebty name
Iribauertaentjemhu
Who exercised power against the land of Temehu
G16	D4 G30 Z3 D21 N17 Z1 N21 S3 U33 M17 G17 V28 G43 T14 A1 A1 N17 Z2
Golden Horus
Nebsenedjaashefit
Lord of fear and great of Majesty
G8	V30 G54 O29 I9 F8
Prenomen
Baenre Merynetjeru
The Soul of Ra, Beloved of the Gods

M23 X1 L2 X1	N5 E11 n N36 nTr nTr nTr
Nomen
Merneptah Hotephermaat
Beloved of Ptah, Joyous is Truth

G39 N5	H6 X1 D42 U4 D2 Z1 R4 X1 Q3 V28 Q3 X1 U6 N35
- Consorts: Isetnofret II; Takhat (?)
- Children: Seti II; Merenptah; Khaemwaset; Isetnofret; Amenmesse (?)
- Father: Ramesses II
- Mother: Isetnofret
- Born: c. 1263 BC
- Died: c. 1203 BC (aged 60)
- Burial: KV8; Mummy found in the KV35 royal cache (Theban Necropolis)
- Dynasty: Nineteenth Dynasty

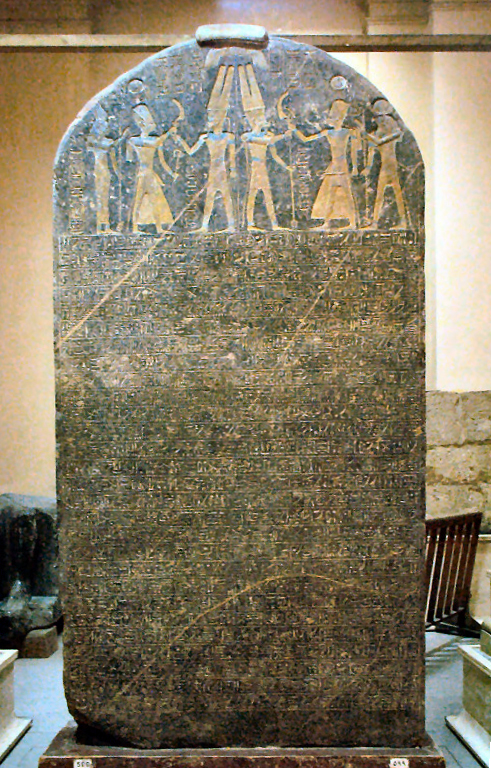
Merenptah Israel Stele Cairo

Merneptah (/ˈmɛrnɛptɑː, mərˈnɛptɑː/) or Merenptah (reigned 27 July 1213–2 May 1203 BCE) was the fourth pharaoh of the Nineteenth Dynasty of Ancient Egypt. According to contemporary historical records, he ruled Egypt for almost ten years, from 27 July 1213 until his death on 2 May 1203. He was the first royal-born pharaoh since Tutankhamun of the Eighteenth Dynasty of Egypt.

Merneptah was the thirteenth son of Ramesses II, only coming to power because all of his older brothers had died, including his full brother Khaemweset.

He was around fifty years old when he ascended to the throne. He is arguably best known for the Merneptah Stele, featuring the first known mention of the name Israel. His throne name was Ba-en-re Mery-netjeru, which means "Soul of Ra, Beloved of the Gods".

== Early years ==
=== Family ===
Merneptah was likely the fourth child born to Isetnofret and Ramesses II, and his thirteenth son. He was the first royal-born pharaoh since Tutankhamun. He married Isetnofret II, who was likely his full sister or niece, who would become Great Royal Wife when he was named pharaoh. They had at least two sons, Merenptah, named after his father, and Seti II. When Seti II became pharaoh, Tausret became his Great Royal Wife. She became pharaoh in her own right after the death of pharaoh Siptah.

Takhat, the mother of Amenmesse, may have been a secondary queen of Merneptah, though scholars are yet to confirm this.

=== King's Son ===
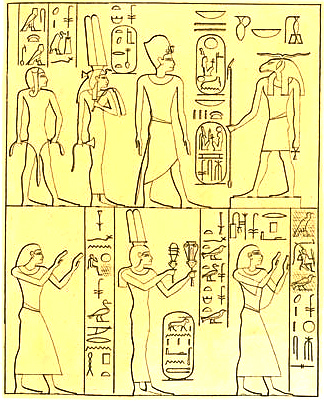
Aswan Rockstela. Top: Ramesses II, Isetnofret and Khaemwaset before Khnum. Bottom left to right: Merneptah, Bintanath and Prince Ramesses

Ramesses II lived well into his nineties and was one of the oldest pharaohs in Egyptian history. He outlived many of his heirs; eventually, Merneptah would be the son to succeed him. Merneptah would have been prepared to be pharaoh through the responsibility of his government roles.

Merneptah is depicted as a prince in Aswan on a royal family stela dating to Year 30 of Ramesses II, and on a family stela from the Speos of Horemheb at Silsila dating to Years 33/34 of Ramesses II, On these stelae he is accompanied by his parents and arranged by age alongside his sister Bintanath and his brothers Ramesses and Khaemwaset.

However, other than that, we know virtually nothing else about Merneptah before Year 40 of Ramesses II, when he became Overseer of the Army (General).

=== Crown Prince ===
In Year 55 of Ramesses II, his brother Khaemwaset died, and Merneptah was officially proclaimed crown prince. At that point, he gained additional responsibilities by serving as Prince Regent for the last twelve years of Ramesses II's life.

== Reign ==
=== Chronology ===
According to one reading of contemporary historical records, Merneptah ruled Egypt for almost ten years, from late July or early August 1213 BC until his death on 2 May 1203 BC. Alternatively, astronomical calculation of a potentially reported annular eclipse (Joshua 10:10-14) that precedes Merneptah's Canaanite campaign against the Israelites places the beginning of his reign in 1209 or 1210 BC.

=== New capital ===
Merneptah moved Egypt's administrative center from Pi-Ramesses, his father's capital, back to Memphis, where he constructed a royal palace next to the temple of Ptah. The Penn Museum, led by Clarence Stanley Fisher, excavated this palace in 1915.

=== Campaigns ===
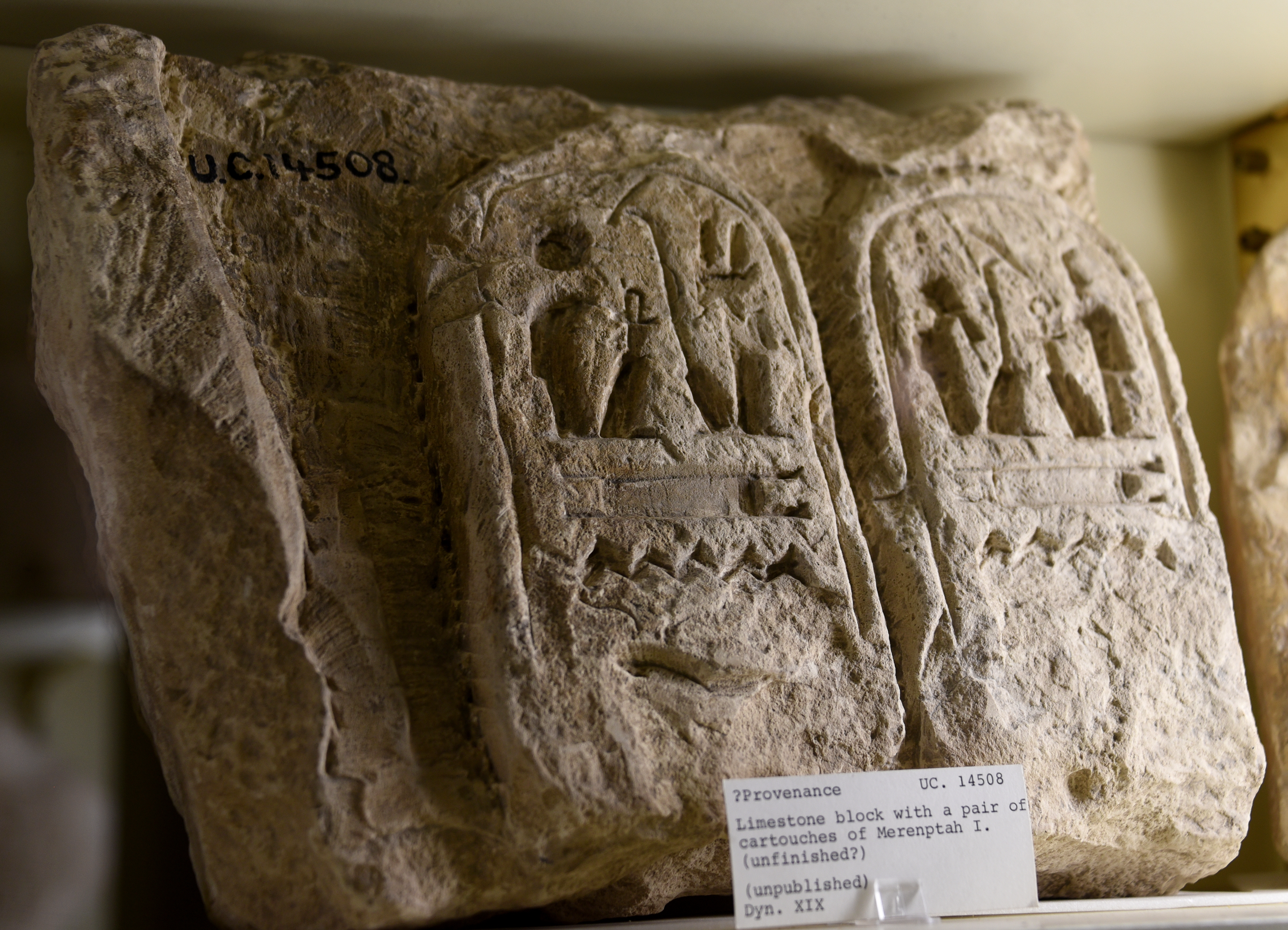
Limestone block showing a pair of unfinished cartouches of Merenptah (Merneptah) I, 19th dynasty of Egypt, Petrie Museum of Egyptian Archaeology, London

Merneptah had to carry out several military campaigns during his reign. In the fifth year of his rule, he fought against the Libyans, who—with the assistance of the Sea Peoples—were threatening Egypt from the west. Merneptah led a victorious six-hour battle against a combined Libyan and Sea People force at the city of Perire, probably located on the western edge of the Nile Delta. His account of this campaign against the Sea Peoples and Libu is described in prose on a wall beside the sixth pylon at Karnak, which states:

[Beginning of the victory that his majesty achieved in the land of Libya] -I, Ekwesh, Teresh, Lukka, Sherden, Shekelesh, Northerners coming from all lands.

Later in the inscription, Merneptah receives news of the attack:

... the third season, saying: 'The wretched, fallen chief of Libya, Meryre, son of Ded, has fallen upon the country of Tehenu with his bowmen—Sherden, Shekelesh, Ekwesh, Lukka, Teresh, Taking the best of every warrior and every man of war of his country. He has brought his wife and his children—leaders of the camp, and he has reached the western boundary in the fields of Perire.'

An inscription on the Athribis Stele, now in the garden of Cairo Museum, declares "His majesty was enraged at their report, like a lion", assembled his court, and gave a rousing speech. Later he dreamed that he saw Ptah handing him a sword and saying "Take thou (it) and banish thou the fearful heart from thee." When the bowmen went forth, says the inscription, "Amun was with them as a shield." After six hours the surviving Nine Bows threw down their weapons, abandoned their baggage and dependents, and ran for their lives. Merneptah states that he defeated the invasion, killing 6,000 soldiers and taking 9,000 prisoners. To be sure of the numbers, among other things, he took the penises of all uncircumcised enemy dead and the hands of all the circumcised, from which history learns that the Ekwesh were circumcised, a fact causing some to doubt that they were Greek people.

There is also an account of the same events in the form of a poem from the Merneptah Stele, also known as the Israel Stele, which mentions the suppression of revolts in Canaan and makes reference to the supposed utter destruction of Israel in a campaign prior to his fifth year, in Canaan: "Israel has been wiped out ... its seed is no more." This is the first recognised ancient Egyptian record of the existence of Israel—"not as a country or city, but as a tribe" or people. A newly discovered massive layer of fiery destruction confirms Merneptah's boast about his Canaanite campaign.

=== Inscriptions ===
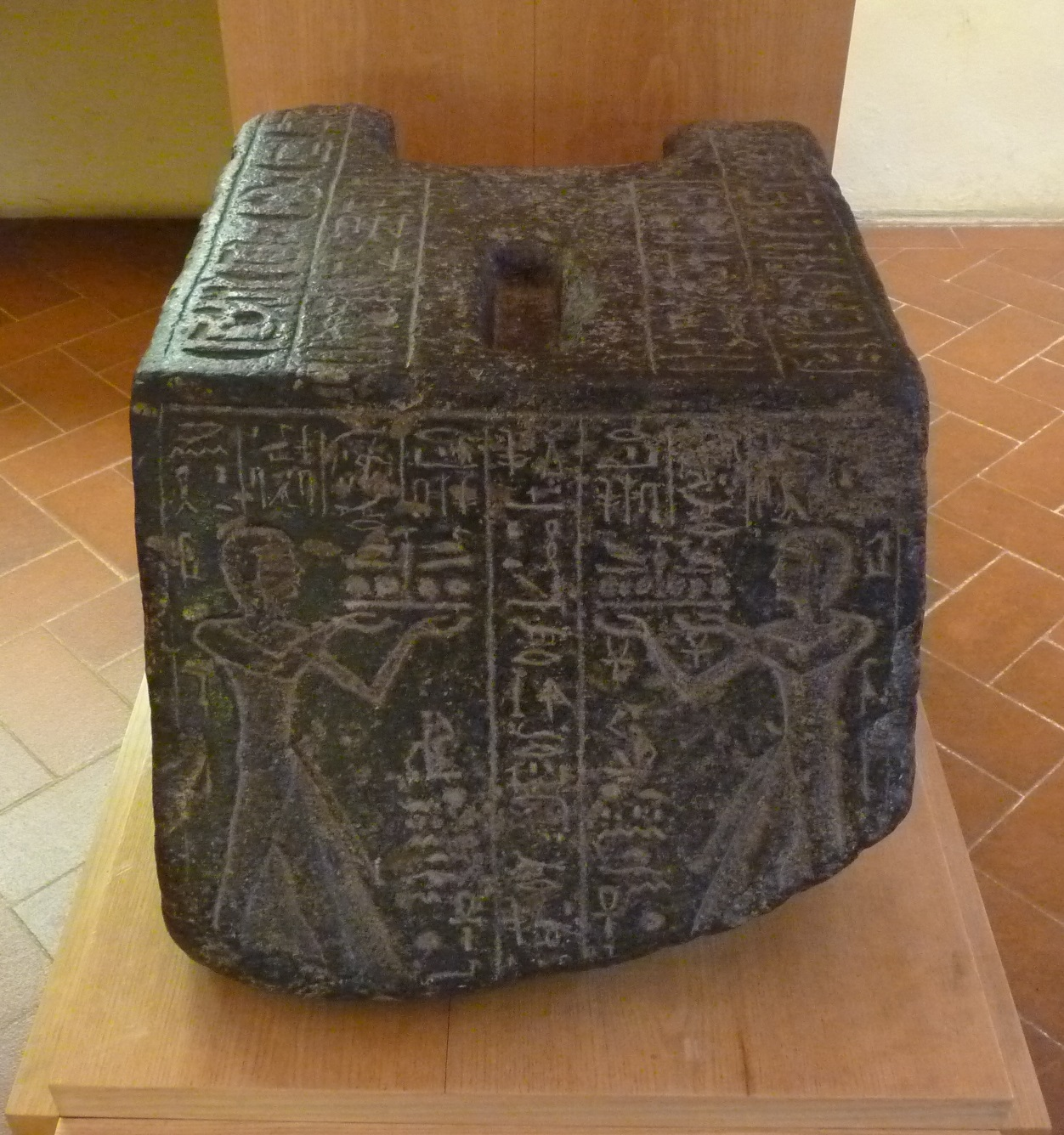
- Merenptah statue base Florence
  At Karnak, the Great Karnak Inscription of Merneptah (KIU 4246) provides information on the king's military exploits.
- At Karnak, the Merneptah Stele (JE 31408) is famous for its mention of "Israel/Yisrael".
- At Amada, the Fourth Year Text of Merneptah.

== Death ==
As soon as Merneptah died the succession apparently had become a problem, he was put in his tomb KV 8 but later removed, and his mummy has survived.

=== Succession ===
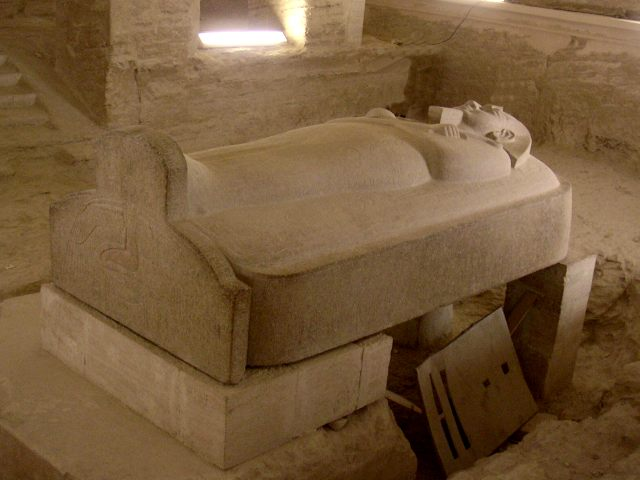
Stone sarcophagus of Merneptah in KV8

Mummy studies show that Merneptah died at around sixty years of age. It is inferred that he was born between the 10th and 17th years of Ramesses II’s reign, and by the time he ascended the throne, he was likely already over fifty.

Merneptah's successor, Seti II, was a son of Queen Isetnofret. However, Seti II's accession to the throne was not unchallenged: a rival king named Amenmesse, who was either another son of Merneptah by Takhat or, much less likely, of Ramesses II, seized control of Upper Egypt and Kush during the middle of the reign of Seti II. Only after he overcame Amenmesse, was Seti able to reassert his authority over Thebes in his fifth year. It is possible that before seizing Upper Egypt, Amenmesse had been known as Messuy and had been viceroy of Kush.

=== Tomb ===
At Thebes, the Tomb of Merneptah (KV8) was in the Valley of the Kings.

=== Mummy ===
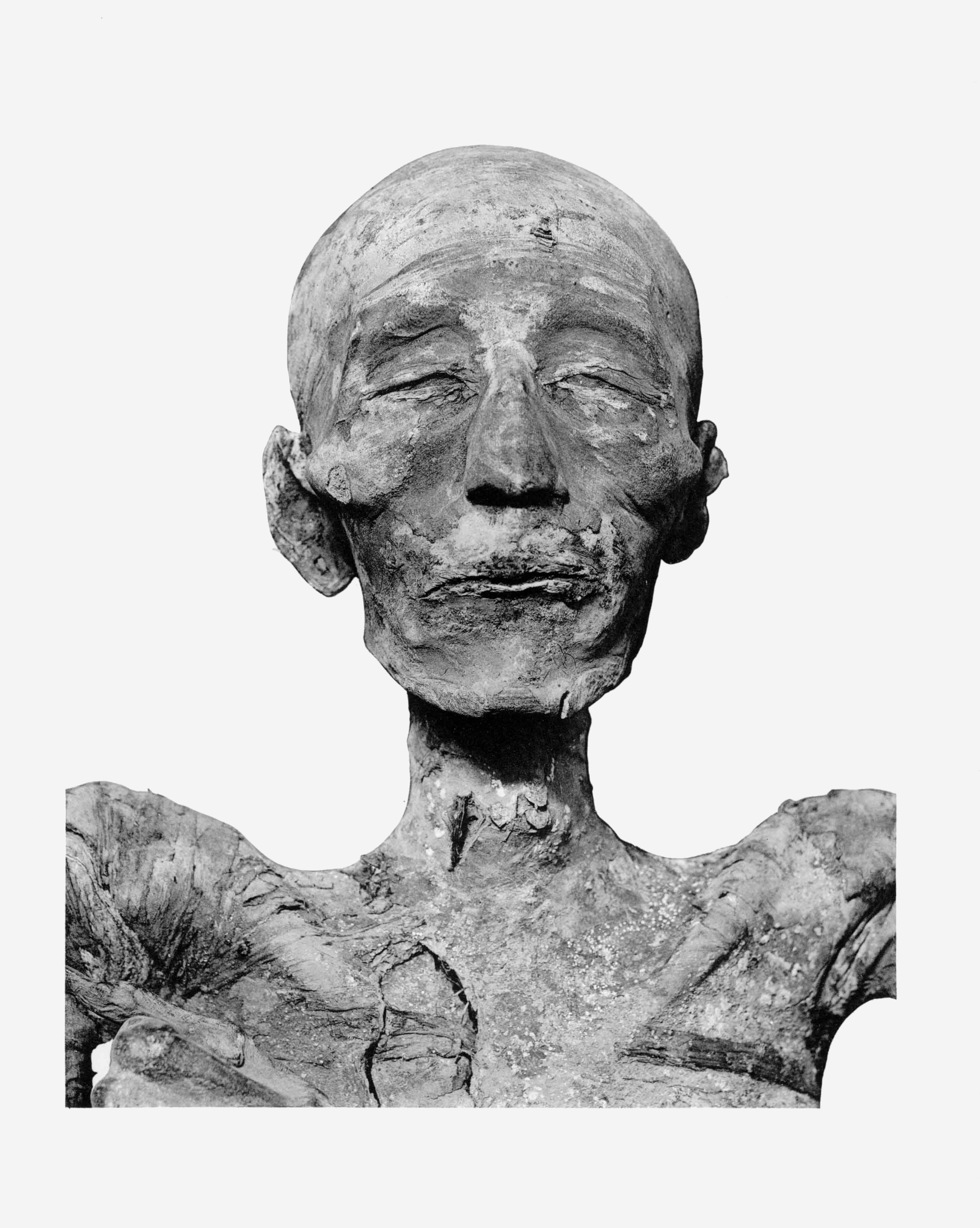
Mummy of Merneptah

Merneptah suffered from arthritis and atherosclerosis and died as an old man after a reign that lasted for nearly a decade. He was originally buried within tomb KV8 in the Valley of the Kings, but his mummy was not found there, having been moved in ancient times. In 1898, it was located along with eighteen other mummies in the mummy cache found in the tomb of Amenhotep II (KV35) by Victor Loret. His mummy was taken to Cairo and eventually unwrapped by G. Elliott Smith on July 8, 1907. Smith notes that:

The body is that of an old man and is 1 meter 714 millimeters [5'6"] in height. Merneptah was almost completely bald, only a narrow fringe of white hair (now cut so close as to be seen only with difficulty) remaining on the temples and occiput. A few short (about 2 mill) black hairs were found on the upper lip and scattered, closely clipped hairs on the cheeks and chin. The general aspect of the face recalls that of Ramesses II, but the form of the cranium and the measurements of the face much more nearly agree with those of his [grand]father, Seti the Great.

In April 2021 his mummy was moved from the Museum of Egyptian Antiquities to the National Museum of Egyptian Civilization along with those of 17 other kings and 4 queens in an event termed the Pharaohs' Golden Parade.

Examination of the mummy revealed that the king was a corpulent man, perhaps even obese. It also showed that Merneptah was tall, measuring 1.71 m, though slightly shorter than his father, who measured 1.73 m.

== Family ==
Merenptah's Great Royal Wife was Isetnofret II, who was his full sister or her niece as daughter of his full brother Khaemwaset.

They had at least four children:

- Seti Merenptah, who assume the throne as Seti II;
- Merenptah, King's son, Executive at the Head of the Two Lands, and Generalissimo;
- Khaemwaset, King's son, depicted in Karnak Temple;
- Isetnofret, King's daughter, depicted in the Leiden ship log.

Another his possible consort was Takhat. If so, Merenptah would be the father of her son Amenmesse, Seti II's rival for the throne.

== Gallery ==
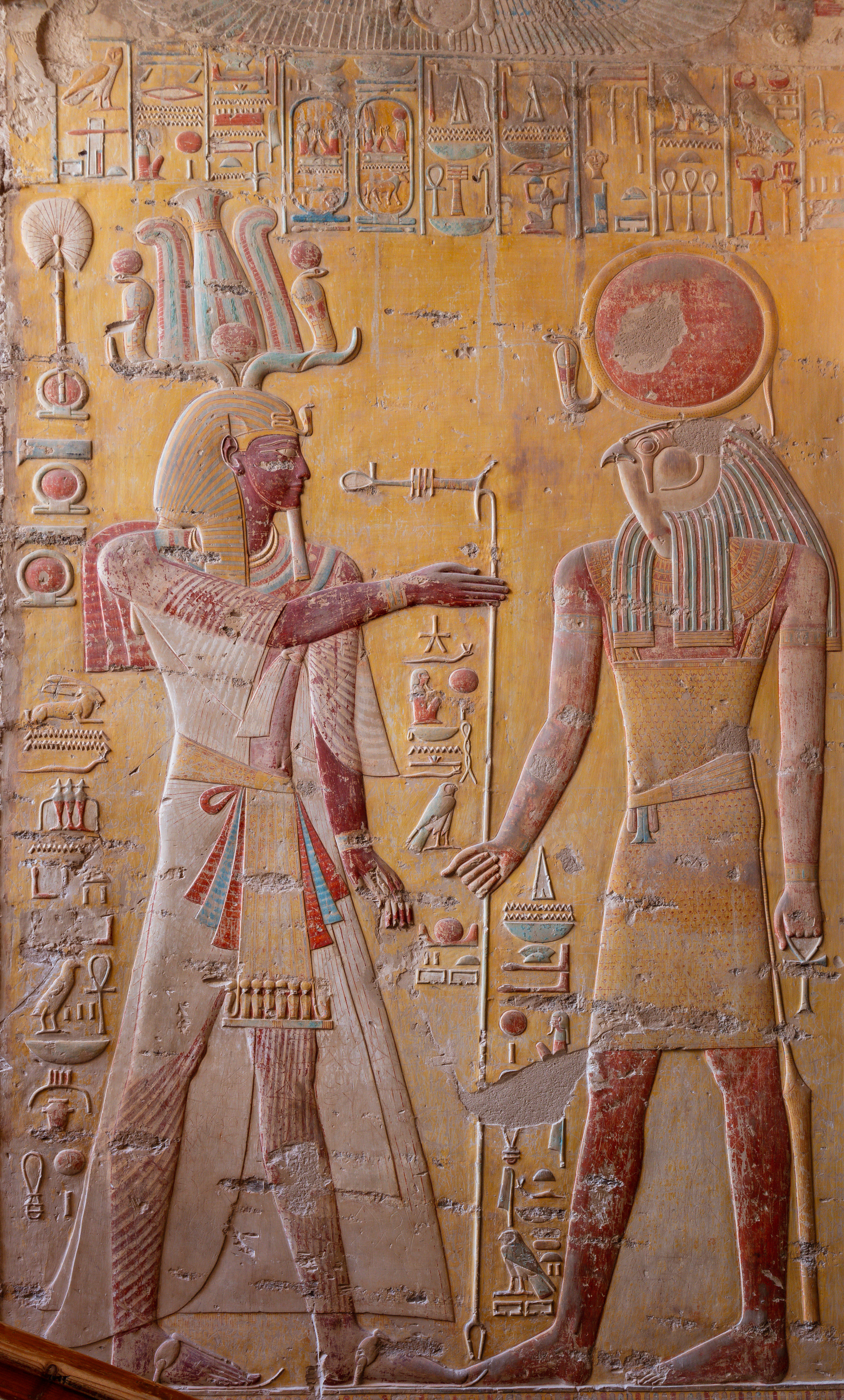
Portrait of Pharaoh Merneptah

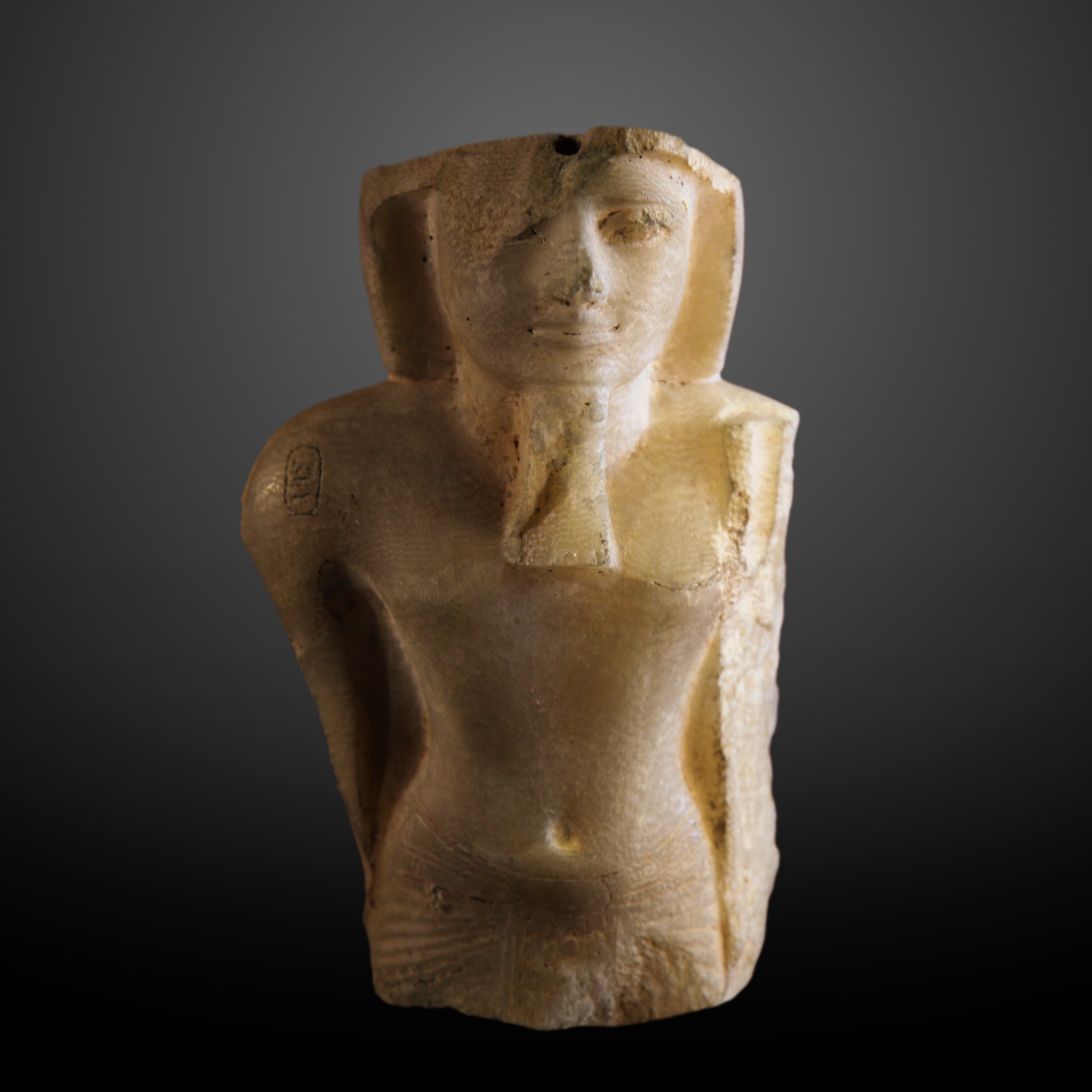
An alabaster statue of Merneptah

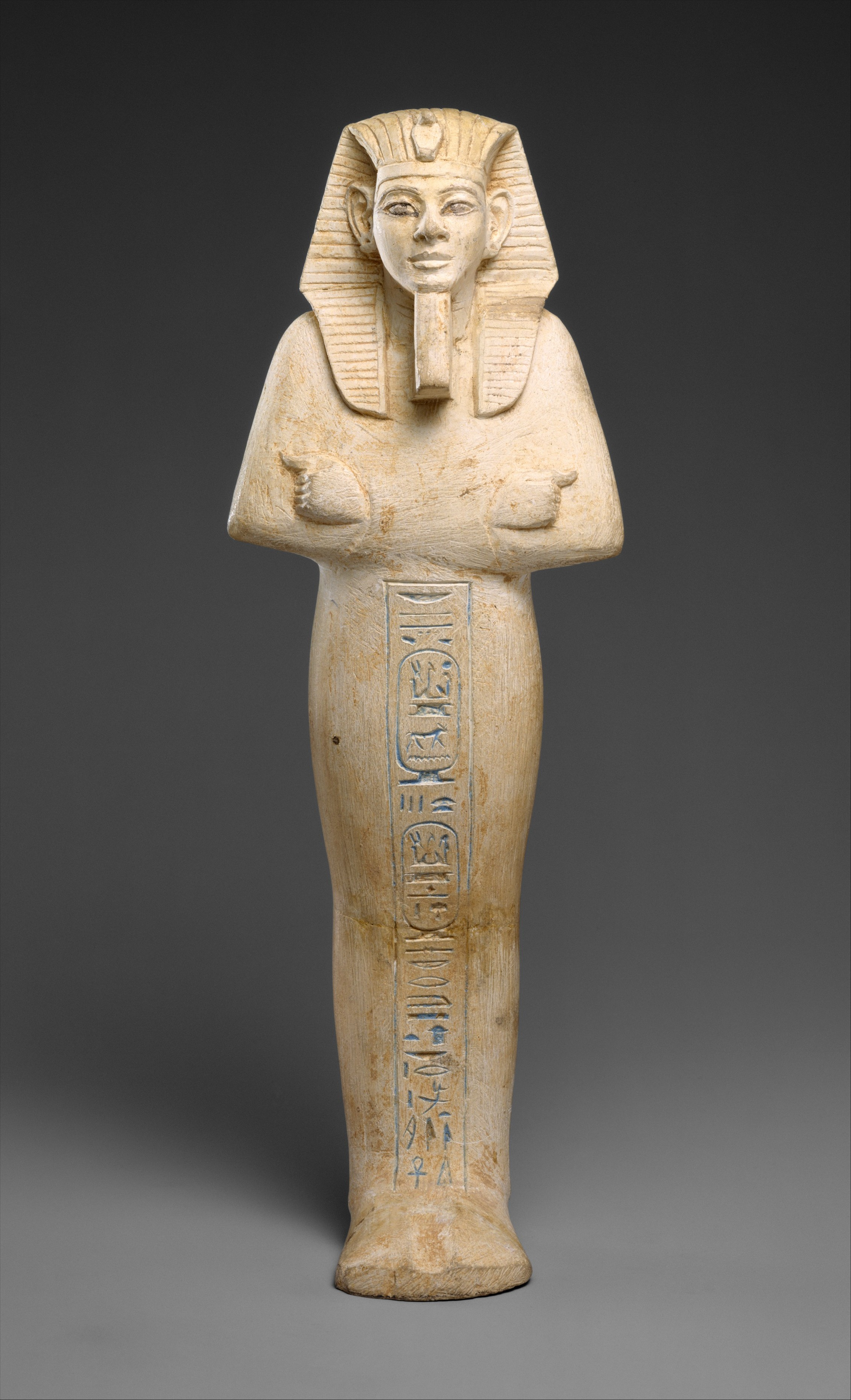
Ushabti of Merneptah

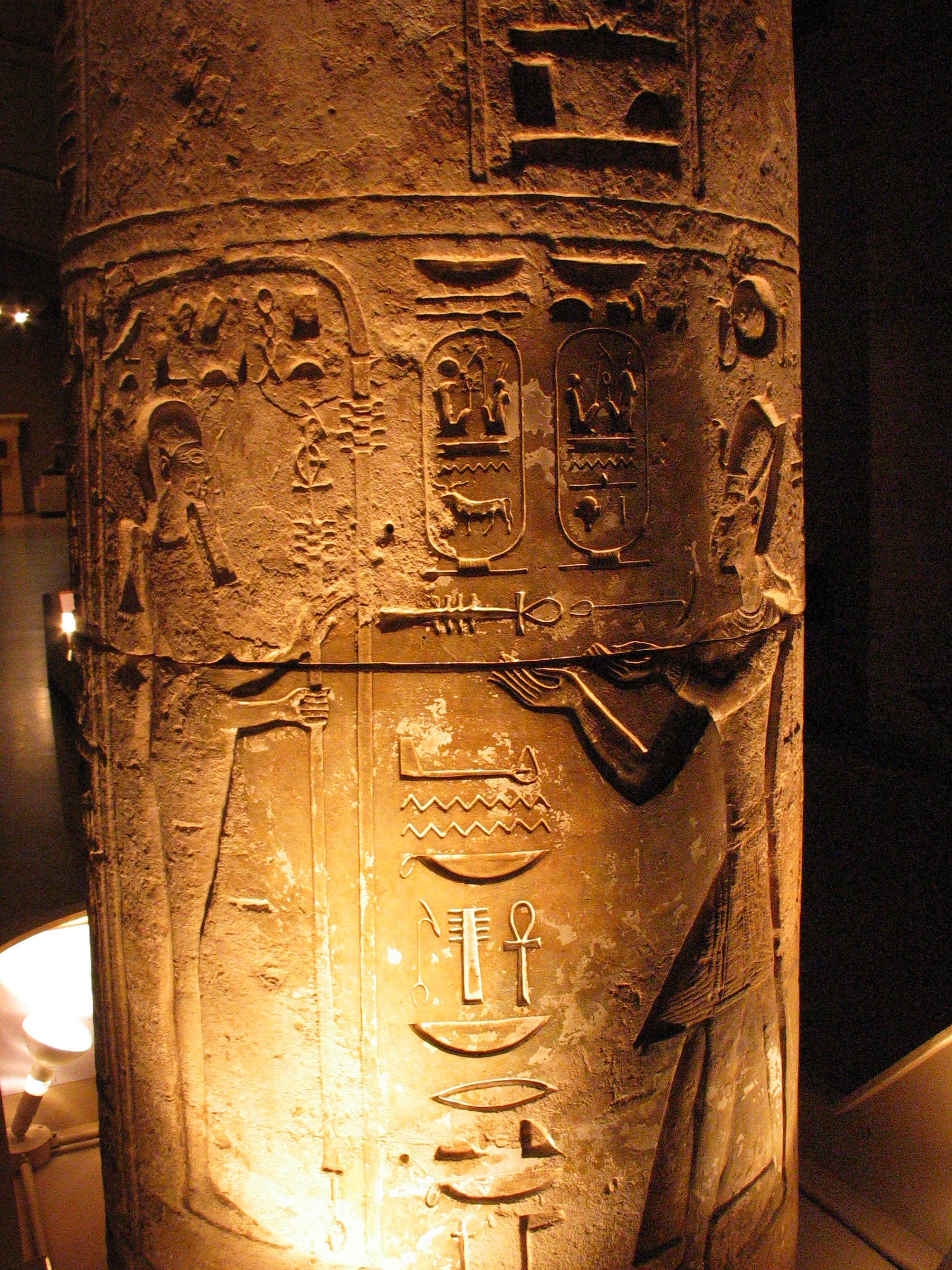
Merneptah makes an offering to Ptah on a column

== See also ==
- List of children of Ramesses II
