= Khay (vizier) =

Ancient Egyptian vizier

- Vizier of the South
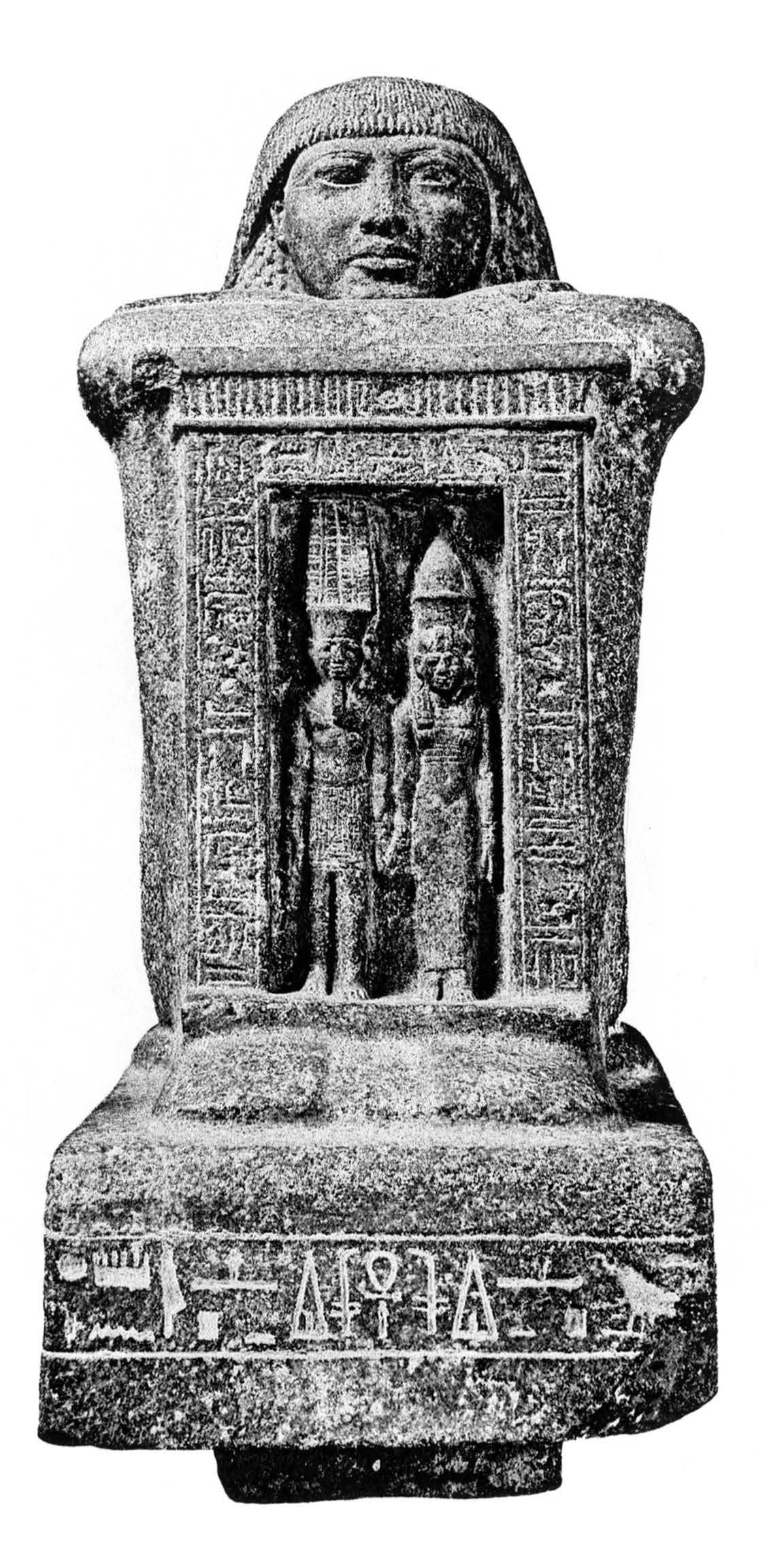
- Block statue of Khay in Cairo (CG 42165).
Egyptian name
N28 a Y1 i i A52
- Dynasty: 19th Dynasty
- Pharaoh: Ramesses II
- Burial: Luxor
- Spouse: Yam
- Father: Hai
- Mother: Nub-em-niut

Khay (Kh-'-y) was an Ancient Egyptian noble who served as Vizier in the latter part of the reign of Ramesses II, during the 19th Dynasty.

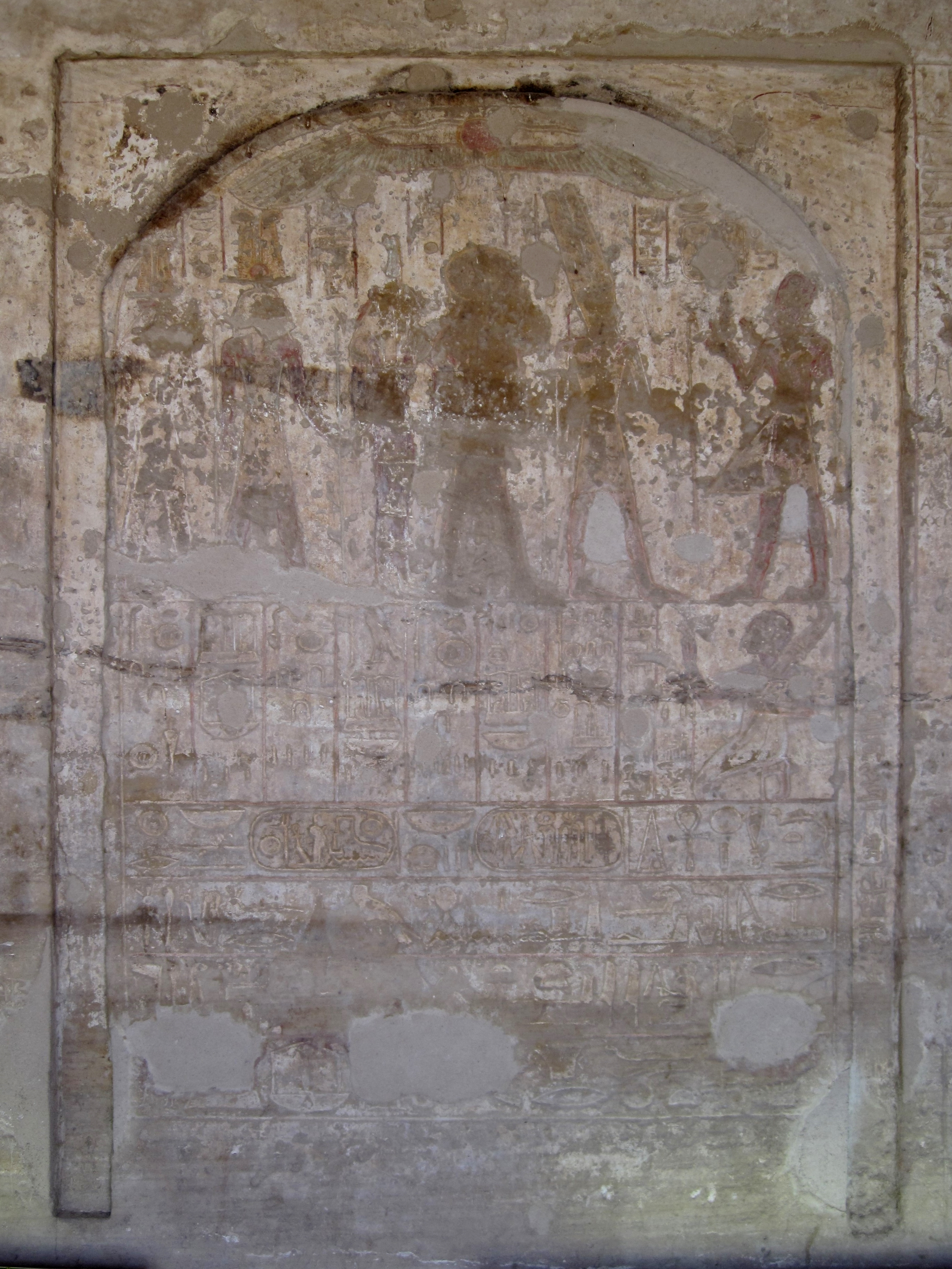
Rock cut stela in the rock cut temple of Horemhab at Gebel el-Silsila. Khay is shown in the second register on the right

== Family ==
A family stela from Abydos mentions that Khay was the son of Hai and Nub-em-niut. Khay's father was said to be greatly favored by the Lord of the Two Lands and a Troop Commander of the goodly god. Khay's mother Nub-em-niut was a chantress of Amun and Lady of the House. Khay's wife is named Yam.

== Life ==
Khay grew up as the son of the Troop Commander Hai. A stela from Abydos shows that Khay started his career as the First Royal Herald of the Lord of the Two Lands. He was charged with reporting the affairs of Egypt. In year 26 of Ramesses II, Khay was appointed Vizier. He may have succeeded Paser in office. After year 40, Khay was in charge of announcing the sed jubilees held by Ramesses II. In West Silsila a stela pronounces that "The Lord of Both Lands, Usermaatre Setepenre, Lord of Crowns, Ramesses II, given life like Re forever. His Majesty decreed that the Hereditary Noble and Count, God's Father beloved of the God, Guardian of Nekhen, Prophet of Maat, Judge and Dignitary, City-governor and Vizier, Khay, justified, be charged to proclaim the Jubilee festival in the entire land, throughout the South and the North." The previous sed festivals had been announced by the King's Son Khaemwaset and Khay both.

== Burial ==
Khay was buried in Sheikh Abd el-Qurna, Thebes, where a mud brick pyramid belonging to the tomb complex was found by the mission of Université libre de Bruxelles in 2013. The pyramid would have stood about 15 metres (49 ft) high and was approximately 12 metres (39 ft) wide. The pyramid was capped with a pyramidion depicting Khay before the god Ra-Harakhty.
