= Nebneteru Tenry =

Egyptian high priest of Amun

- High Priest of Amun
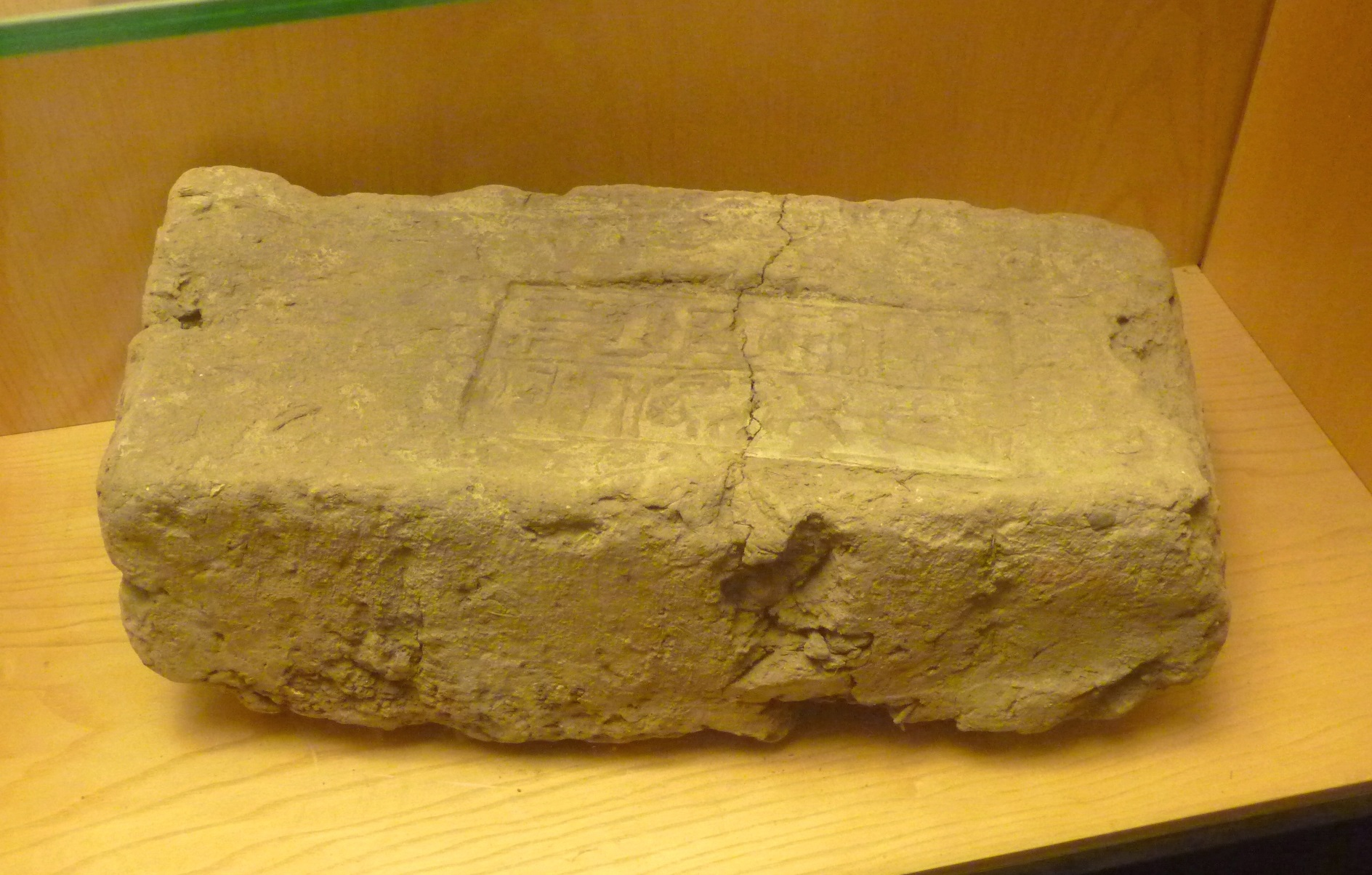
- Mudbrick dedicated to Paser, mentioning his father Nebneteru, now in Florence
Egyptian name
nb R8 R8 R8 A52 I10 d f V13 n N33A r i A51
- Predecessor: Parennefer called Wennefer
- Successor: Nebwenenef
- Dynasty: 19th Dynasty
- Pharaoh: Seti I
- Spouse: Merytre
- Children: Paser, Titi(a)

Nebneteru Tenry (or Nebneteru Tjenry) was an ancient Egyptian High Priest of Amun under Seti I.

== Family ==
Nebneteru's wife Merytre was "Chief of the Harem of Amun". Nebneteru and Merytre are known from monuments of their son, the vizier Paser. They are mentioned in TT106, the tomb of Paser, "Governor of the Town" and Vizier as well as on statues belonging to him.

Another son of Nebneteru Tjenry and Merytre is mentioned in the tomb of Paser. A man by the name of Titi(a), "Steward in the temple of Maat" is shown. Nebneteru's in-laws are mentioned as well. Merytre was the daughter of Aniy and born of the lady Nuia.

On a statue of Paser from Memphis, Merytre is said to come from Memphis (Hutkaptah). Nebneteru is mentioned on the statue as well and his titles are given as: "High Priest of Amun in Southern Heliopolis" (i.e. Thebes) and "Sem–Priest in the Temple of Ptah".

The stamped text on a mudbrick now at the National Archaeological Museum of Florence (inv. no. 2641) reads:

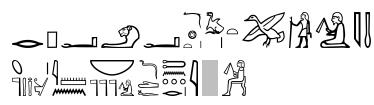
r-pat hAty-a n niwt PAsr mAa-xrw sA tpy n Hm nTr Imn NbnTrw Dd-f Tnry Hereditary Prince and Count, Paser, justified, son of the First Prophet of Amun, Nebneteru, called Tjenry
