= Panehesy (vizier) =

Ancient Egyptian vizier

- Vizier of the South
Egyptian name
G40 G21 H s Z4
- Dynasty: 19th Dynasty
- Pharaoh: Merenptah

Panehesy (also written Panehsy) was a vizier of ancient Egypt. He served during the reign of Merenptah (reigned 1213-1203 BCE) during the 19th Dynasty.

== Monuments and documents ==
Panehesy appears on a monument in Gebel el-Silsila. In the Great Speos, which was originally constructed by Horemheb in the 18th Dynasty but added on to in the 19th Dynasty, we find a chapel of Panehesy. He is shown adoring King Merneptah and in a scene in the doorway he appears with Merneptah, Queen Isetnofret II and Prince Seti-Merneptah. Panehesy's chapel on the south side of the Speos is balanced by a chapel of the vizier Paser on the north side.

Elsewhere in the Speos, Panehesy is depicted on a stela located in the gallery. One stela is located at the northern end of the Speos and the main scene shows Merneptah before the gods Amun-Ra, Monthu, Sobek and Hathor. Another stela is located to the left of the entrance of the sanctuary. On this stela, Penehesy is shown behind Merneptah and Queen Isetnofret II.

Panehesy also appears on a stela near the royal shrines in Gebel el-Silsila. Rock shrines of Sethi I, Ramesses II and Merenptah were erected in the 19th Dynasty. The stela between the shrines of Merneptah and Ramesses II shows Merneptah followed by a Prince (possibly Seti-Merneptah) and the vizier Panehesy. The king offers an image of Maat to Amun-Re.

The Chester Beatty Papyri (III, vs 4-5) contain a letter from a scribe of the necropolis to the Vizier Panehesy. The beginning of the letter says:

The scribe Kenhikhopeshef of the Great Necropolis of Baenre-miamon, the son of Re, Merenptah-hetephimaat, in the estate of Amun communicates to his lord, the fanbearer [on] the king's right, the city prefect and vizier of Upper and Lower Egypt, Panehsy: In life, prosperity and health! This is a missive to inform my lord.(Wente).

The letter continues on to report that work on the Great Place of the Pharaoh (his tomb) is progressing well. There is however a shortage of spikes and gypsum. The scribe requests that some necessary equipment and supplies be sent.
