= Neferronpet =

Ancient Egyptian vizier and High Priest

- Vizier of the South, High Priest of Ptah in Memphis
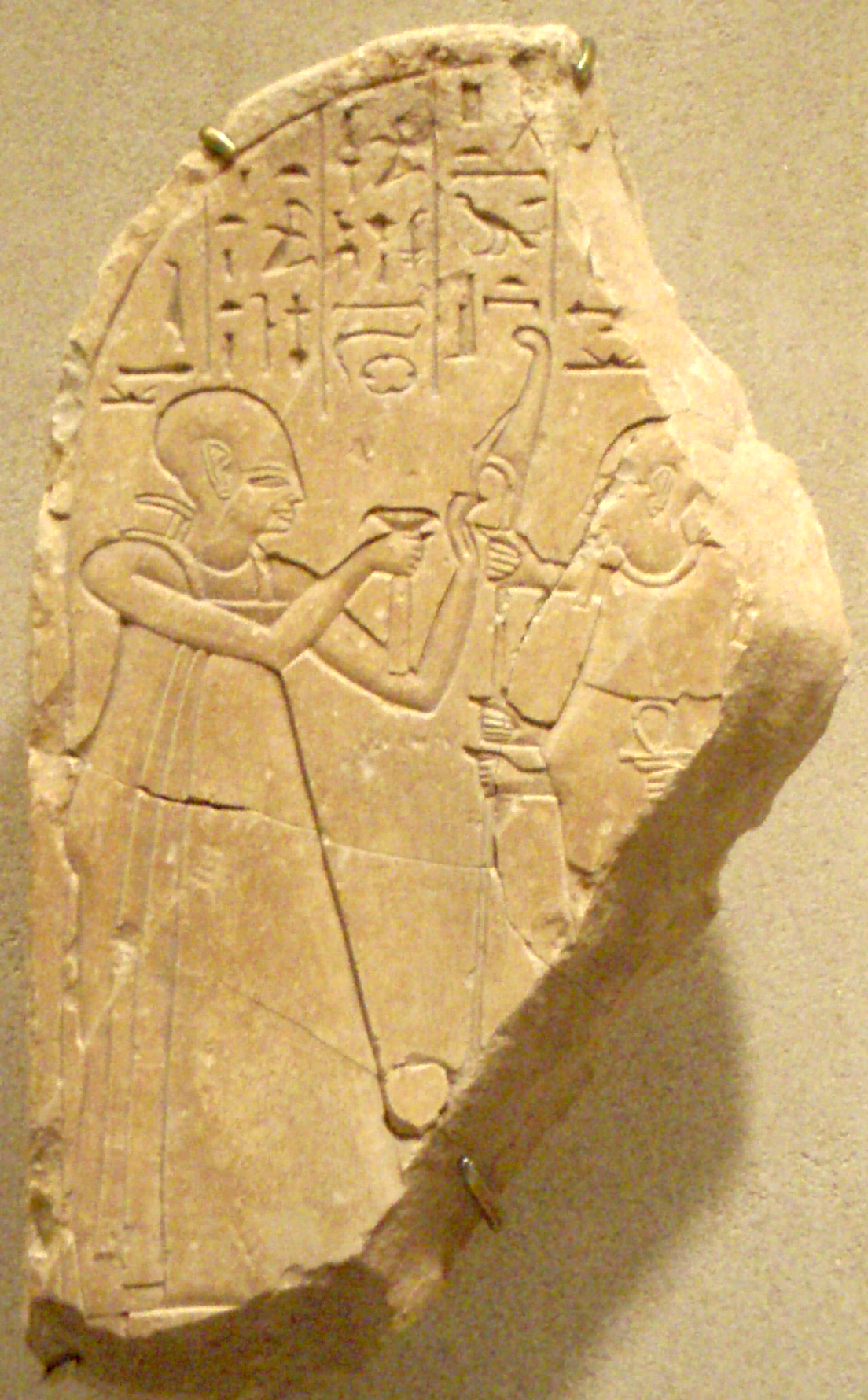
- Neferronpet before Ptah
Egyptian name
F35 M4 X1 Z1
- Predecessor: Khay as Vizier and possibly Khaemwaset as High Priest of Ptah?
- Dynasty: 19th Dynasty
- Pharaoh: Ramesses II, Merenptah, Amenmesse, Seti II
- Burial: Saqqara (alleged)
- Spouse: Mutpipu
- Father: Ptahemakhet
- Children: Bakenptah; Inuhayet; Taweretkha'ti; Reset; Henutmeter

Neferronpet, or Neferrenpet, was a Vizier and High Priest of Ptah from the reign of Ramesses II into the reign of Seti II.

== Life ==
The Genealogy of Ankhefensekhmet dating to the 22nd/23rd dynasty states Neferronpet was the son of Ptahemakhet. The Pyramidion from Liverpool names Neferronpet's son the God's Father of Ptah Bakenptah, Neferronpet's wife Mutpipu and four daughters: Inuhayet, Taweretkha'ti, Res(et), and Henutmeter. As Vizier Neferronpet succeeded Khay in office.

Neferronpet is attested on:

- Two statues from Saqqara now in the Cairo Museum (GCG 713 and GCG 1034)
- The facade of the Speos of Horemheb in West Silsila
- A libation through in the British Museum (BM 108)
- Naos-like monument now in Berlin (Berlin 2290)
- A pyramidion now in the Liverpool City Museum (M 11015)
- A draft of a letter. (Cairo 25747)

== Death ==
It was also the practice of wealthy Egyptians to purchase Book of the Dead papyri, according to the commercial Deir el-Medina texts, and they probably looked very similar to the Nineteenth Dynasty fragmentary example of Neferronpet. A painted papyrus became more widely available to a priest and a scribe like Neferrenpet during the Nineteenth Dynasty. Previously such information was restricted to the royal circle.

Beginning in the New Kingdom, the Egyptians customarily placed in their tombs funerary texts taken from the 'Book of the Dead'. The funerary texts were often incorporated in any way possible. They were etched into tomb walls, inscribed onto papyri and placed in the bandages of the mummy, placed in statues, just to name a few. The 'Book of the Dead' of the sculptor Neferrenpet dates from c. 1250 BC, and "the texts are written in so-called 'cursive hieroglyphs' in vertical columns; they are accompanied by 'vignettes' (illustrations) which emphasize their magical content". These texts were meant to protect the deceased and give them eternal life.

== Gallery ==
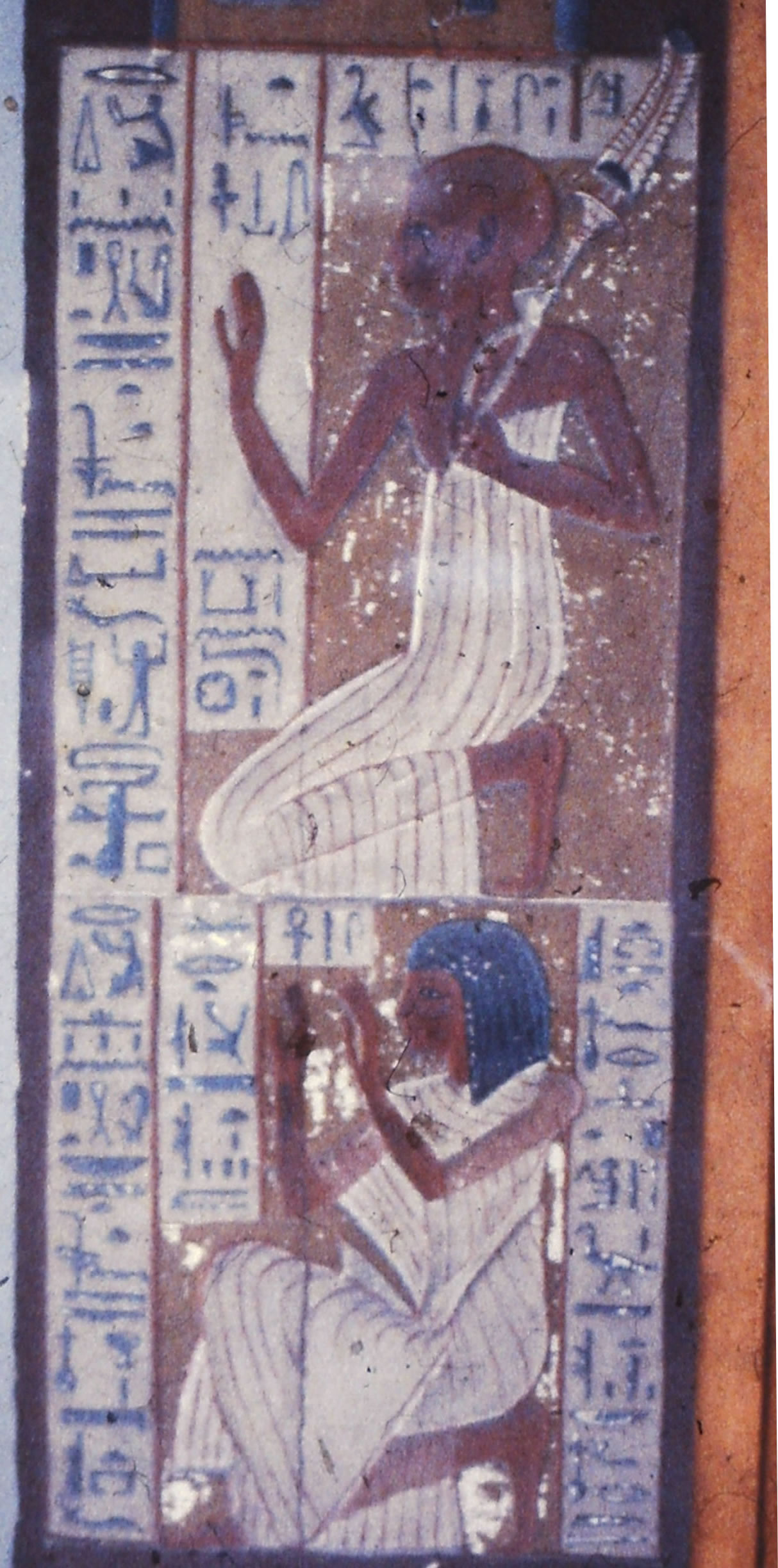
Part of a wooden door frame showing the vizier Neferrenpet; 19th Dynasty of Ancient Egypt, Egyptian Museum in Turin

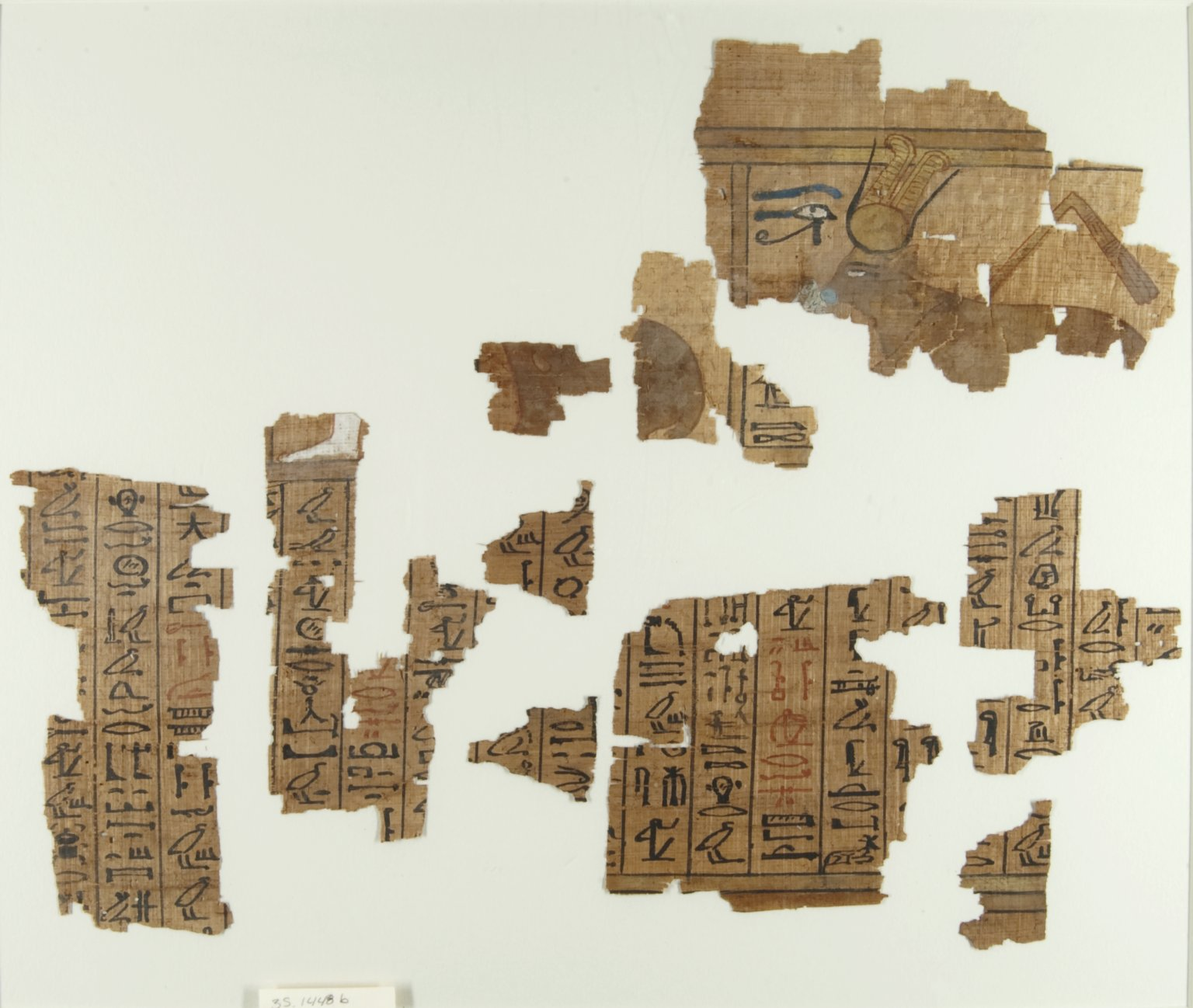
The Book of the Dead of Neferrenpet, ca. 1295-1185 B.C.E.,.35.1448 Brooklyn Museum
