= Gebel el-Silsila =

Gebel el-Silsila جبل السلسلة ẖny Khenu
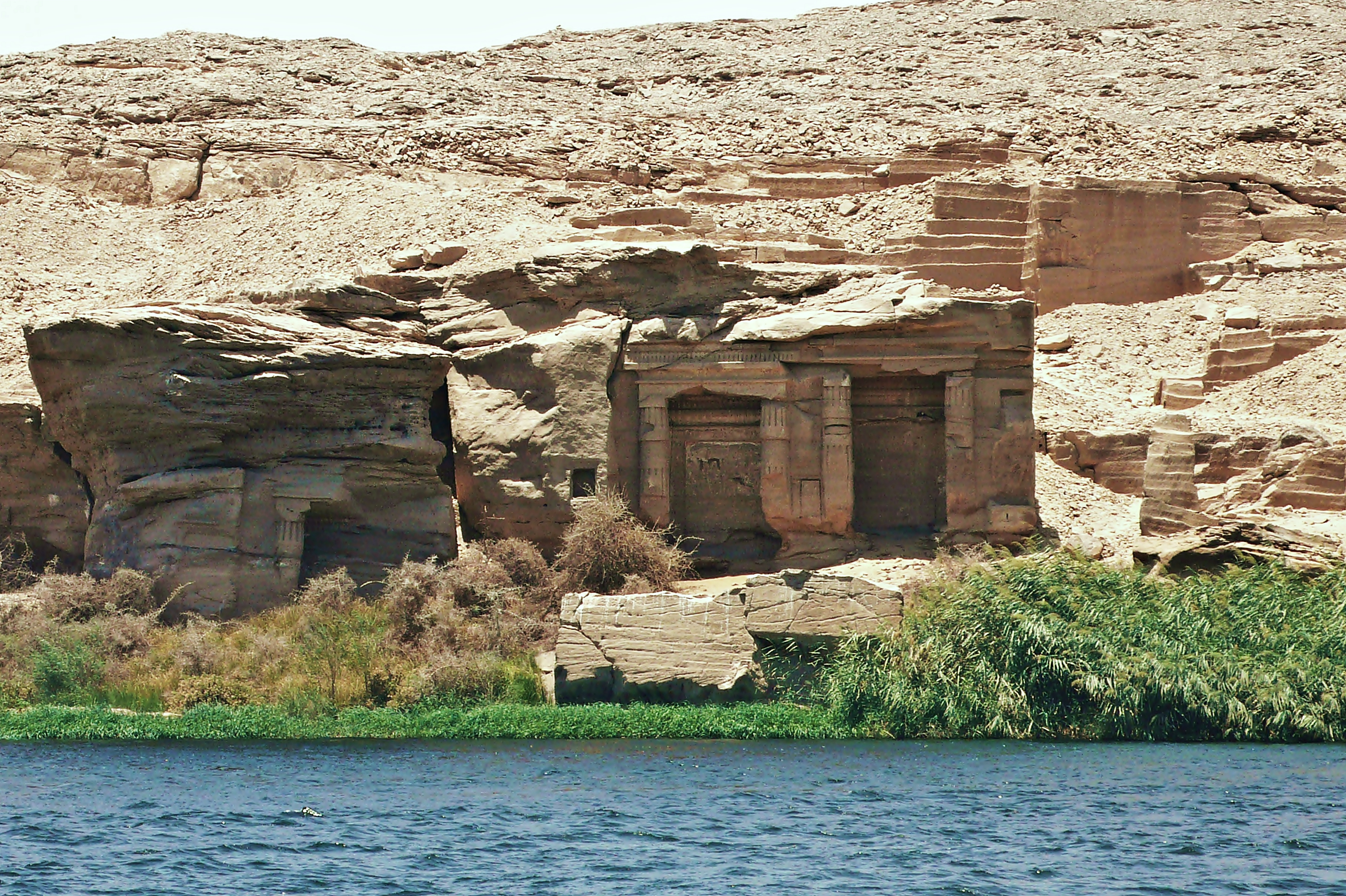
- Ramesside Nile Stelae along the west bank of the Nile

- Location in Egypt
- Coordinates: 24°38′N 32°56′E
- Country: Egypt
- Governorate: Aswan Governorate
- Time zone: UTC+2 (EST)
- Area code: (+20) 97
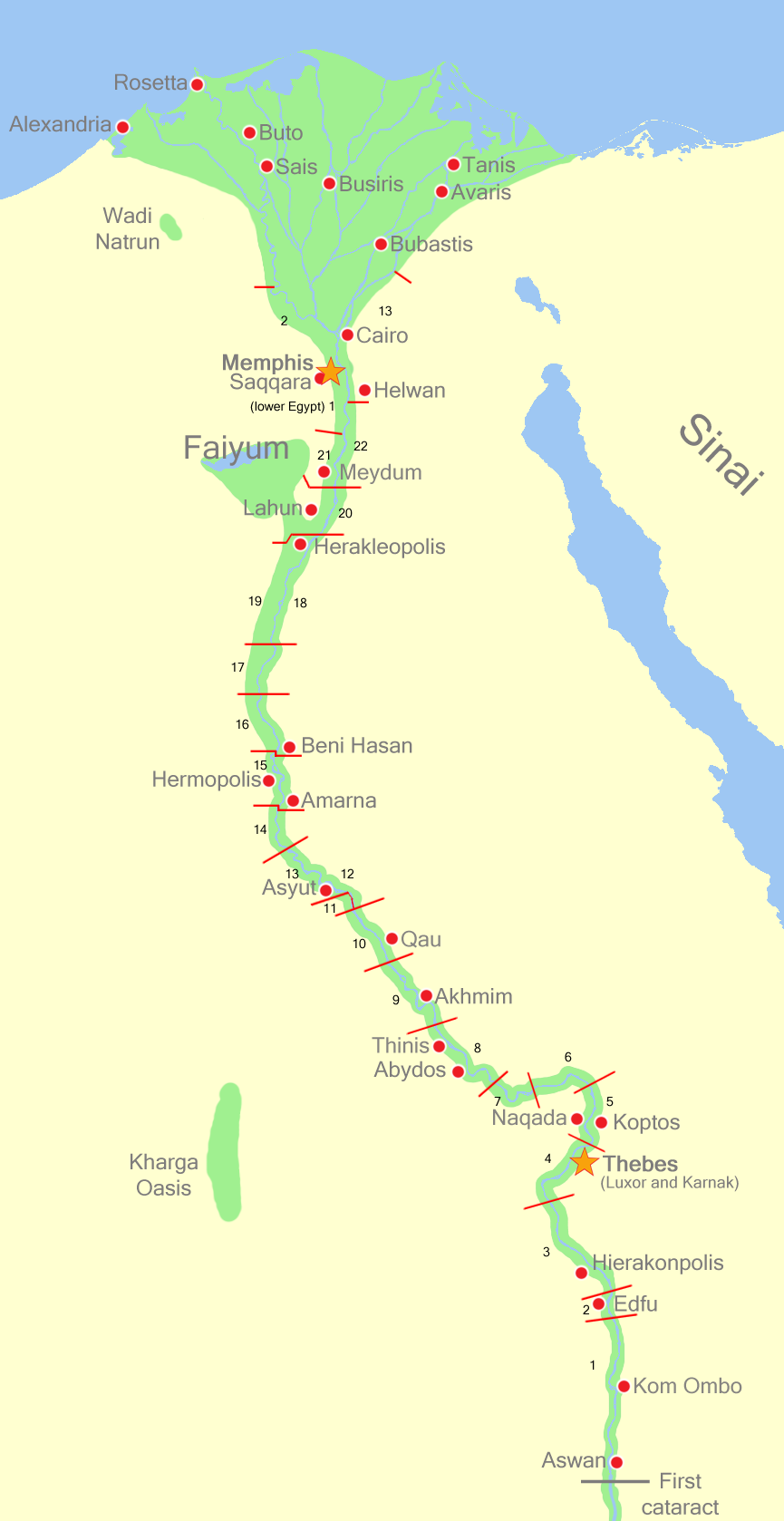
- The nomes of Ancient Egypt

x n i i
Kheny ẖny
in hieroglyphs

D33 n i i niwt
Kheny ẖny
in hieroglyphs

Gebel el-Silsila or Gebel Silsileh (Arabic: جبل السلسلة, transliterated as Jabal al-Silsila or Gabal as-Silsila, meaning "Mountain of the Chain"; Egyptian: ẖny, also rendered as Khenyt, Kheny, or Khenu, meaning "The Place of Rowing") is 65 km (40 mi) north of Aswan in Upper Egypt, with cliffs on both sides close to the narrowest point along the length of the entire Nile. The location is between Edfu in the north towards Lower Egypt and Kom Ombo in the south towards Upper Egypt. It was a major sandstone quarry quarry site on both sides of the Nile from at least the 18th Dynasty to Greco-Roman times. Gebel el-Silsila is famous for its New Kingdom stelai and cenotaphs.

Gebel el Silsila was one of the main sources of sandstone that was used in construction and decoration for some major temples and monuments by the Ancient Egyptians.

== Sandstone quarry ==
The quarry landscape contains over 120 separate quarries which commenced as early as the Middle Kingdom through the New Kingdom, late Period, continuing into the Greco-Roman and modern times.

Through detailed mapping, tool-mark analysis, and spatial recording, the research of the Gebel el-Silsila Archaeological Project has studied the techniques of stone extraction, shaping, and transportation on an industrial scale. Quarry faces, extraction trenches, spoil heaps, and unfinished blocks provide direct evidence for quarrying techniques and labour organisation over multiple reigns, particularly during the 18th and 19th Dynasties. Geologist James Harrell has undertaken a comprehensive study of the geological features of the site along with the quarrying techniques.

Monuments

== Shrines, chapels and temples ==
The site provided numerous stone quarries on both the west and east sides of the Nile. The site contains many shrines erected by New Kingdom officials who would have been in charge of quarrying the stone. Almost all of Ancient Egypt's great New Kingdom and later Ptolemaic temples derived their sandstone from here, such as Karnak, Luxor, Ramesses III's Medinet Habu, Kom Ombo, and the Ramesseum.

The crocodile god Sobek, controller of the Nile.

=== West bank subsites ===
The rock-cut temple or Speos, known previously as the Temple of Horemheb, was created during the 18th Dynasty, in particular the reign of Hatshepsut (Nilsson, 2017). The temple was heavily over-carved during the Ramesside era, followed by centuries of graffiti from the Graeco-Roman, Christian and later periods. The Ramesside temple decoration is dedicated to seven deities, including Amun, the local god Sobek and Horemheb. The scenes on the facade of the Speos include Ramesses III offering Maat to Amun-Re, Mut, Khonsu and Sobek in one scene and offering Maat to Anhur-Shu in another scene. Elsewhere Ramesses II is depicted in the company of his Vizier Neferronpet, while offering Maat to Ptah and Sobek. The central doorway contains a stele showing Sety II before Amun-Re, Mut and Khons. Images of Sobek of Kheny have been defaced, part of a widespread iconoclasm targeted to the regional version of this god (Derbyshire, 2025).

The Speos also contains two chapels belonging to Viziers. On the south end of the entrance is the chapel of Panehesy, Vizier to Merenptah. Panehesy is shown adoring Merenptah. Panehesy is also depicted on a stele showing Merenptah, Queen Isetnofret, and Prince Sety-Merenptah (later Seti II). On the northern end is a similar chapel of the Vizier Paser from the reign of Ramesses II. A stele in the doorway shows Ramesses II, Queen Isetnofret and Princess-Queen Bintanath. The king is offering Maat to Ptah and Nefertem.

Royal Stelae: South of the Speos are four monumental royal stelae (The Nile Stelae). They include a rock stela depicting Ramesses V before Amun-Re, Mut, Khons and Sobek. Ramesses III is shown offering Maat to Amun-Re, Mut and Khons. From a much later time is the stele of Shoshenq I. The scene shows Shoshenq accompanied by his son Iuput. The text is dated to year 21 of his reign. The goddess Mut leads the king and his son before Amun-Re, Re-Harakhti and Ptah.

South of the royal stelae many cenotaphs are located. These include shrines for the Scribe of the Treasury of Thutmose, the Overseer of the Seal of Min (from the time of Hatshepsut and Thutmose III), an official named Maa, and the Scribe of the Nome Ahmose (from the period of Hatshepsut and Thutmose III).

North of the royal stelae more cenotaphs can be found. One shrine belonged to an official dated to the reigns of Hatshepsut and Thutmose III: User, vizier. A shrine at this site records User's family, including his father Amethu called Ahmose.

Further shrines were constructed near the river. Most of these date to the reigns of Hatshepsut and Thutmose III. Included are the shrines of some high-ranking officials such as the Overseer of the Granaries Minnakht, the Overseer of the Seal and Royal Herald Sennufer, the Overseer of the Seal Nehesy, the Overseer of the Prophets of Upper and Lower Egypt Hapuseneb, and the Great Steward of the Queen Senenmut. Senenmut's is noteworthy because the inscriptions show a change in the status of Hatshepsut. She is said to be the "King's First-born Daughter" and she is depicted as a pharaoh in a striding fashion.

Additionally, three rock-cut shrines were constructed and the site also shows some royal stelae. The shrines belong to Seti I, Ramesses II and Merenptah. One of the stele depicts Ramesses III offering wine to Amun-Re, Re-Harakhty and Hapi. The stele mentions year 6 of the reign of Ramesses III. Adjoining this is another stele, this one depicting Horemheb adoring Sety I. The area of the stelae were known in ancient times as 'The Pure Water' and have been studied by Dr Moamen Saad of the Gebel el-Silsila Archaeological Project.

Between the shrines of Merenptah and Ramesses II a stele was erected depicting Merenptah and a son (likely Sety-Merenptah, but the name has been destroyed) offering Maat to Amun-Re. The royals are accompanied by the Vizier Panehesy.

=== East bank subsites ===
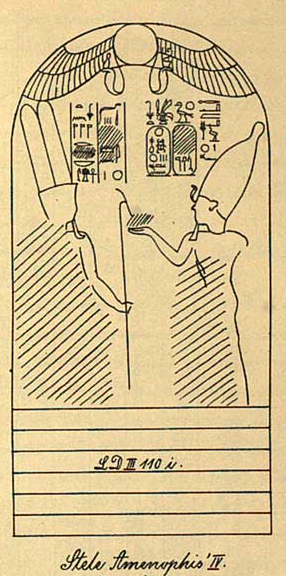
Stele of Amenhotep IV (Akhenaten) from Gebel el-Silsila. Kings are shown adoring Amun-Re. Image depiction from Lepsius.

Survey work of the east bank has revealed 49 quarries, the largest being Quarry 34 (Q34) (reviewed in 7 partitions due to its immensity) containing 54 stone huts.

The East bank holds several stelae from the time of Amenhotep III. The stele and their texts are described in Karl Richard Lepsius' Denkmahler. The stelae are damaged, but one of them was inscribed in year 35. Amenhotep is shown adoring Amun-Re and is called "beloved of Sobek" in the inscriptions. The stela have been studied and described by Georges Legrain.

A shrine with stelae on three sides depicting Amenhotep III is located at Gebel el-Silsila East. In the scenes Amenhotep III is accompanied by an official named Amenhotep, who held the title "Eyes of the King in the whole land".

Akhenaten at Silsila

A stela was discovered showing Akhenaten—named Amenhotep IV—before Amun-Re.

Many of the talatats used by Akhenaten were quarried from here and used in buildings at Luxor and Amarna. A stele from the early part of Akhenaten's reign shows the king offering to Amun beneath the winged sun-disk. The inscription records that stone was cut for the great Benben of Harakhty in Thebes. Akhenaten's sculptor Bek oversaw the opening of a stone quarry here.

Further finds date to the time of Sety I. An inscription from year 6 shows Sety I before Amun-Re, Ptah and a goddess. Another stele shows the Commander of troops of the fortress of the Lord of the Two Lands, named Hapi adoring the cartouche of Sety I.

The rediscovery of the Temple of Kheny is a significant find for the east bank. The other item of significance is the collection of over 5,000 epigraphic symbols and hieroglyphs collected from this site and all over Egypt. There appears to be an image depicting the actual transport of the sandstone blocks to temple sites.

The east bank also has two unfinished ram-headed sphinxes or criosphinxes.

Indications have been noted of possible stables providing horses to the Roman Caesars.

== Table of monuments ==
This is a list of notable monuments for Gebel el-Silsila.

MONUMENTS AT GEBEL el-SILSILA
| Monument Name | Alternate Name | Bank (West/East) | Type | Characteristic | Stone | Dedicated to | Features | Notes |
West Bank
| Temple of Hatshepsut | Temple of Horemheb | West | Temple | Rock-cut | Sandstone | 7 deities, including Amun, the local god Sobek, and Horemheb | Facade scene includes Ramesses III offering Maat to Amun-Re, Mut, Khonsu, and Sobek; another scene offers Maat to Anhur-Shu. | Largest structure at Silsila. |
| Chapel of Panehesy | Speos south chapel | West | Chapel within temple | | Sandstone |
| Chapel of Paser | Speos north chapel | West | Chapel within temple | | Sandstone |
East Bank
| Temple of Sobek of Kheny | | East | Temple | | Limestone early; Sandstone later | Local god Sobek | Foundations and in situ blocks on the eastern wall. Column bases. 3,000 relief fragments with attestations for Thutmose III, Amenhotep III, Ramesses II and Ramesses III. Evidence of iconoclasm and deliberate destruction | Remnants. 4 floors. |

== Temple of Kheny (Temple of Sobek) ==
Remains of the Temple of Kheny have been rediscovered by the Gebel el-Silsila Archaeological Mission as foundations and surface remnants, showing the temple foundations and blockwork. The excavation and study of the Temple of Sobek on the East Bank constitutes one of the most significant achievements of the Swedish Mission.

Rediscovered in 2015 beneath accumulated sand and debris, the temple revealed a multi-phase construction history spanning at least three hundred years and four major periods: the early Thutmosid phase (possibly including Hatshepsut), the reign of Amenhotep III, the 19th Dynasty/ Ramesside period, and later Roman reuse. Architecturally, the structure includes dressed floor levels, column bases, internal divisions, and a central platform indicative of a formal cultic layout. The presence of limestone relief fragments, exceptional within a sandstone quarry environment, suggests an early phase of construction predating the widespread adoption of sandstone. Nearly 3,000 relief fragments, including blocks and inscribed elements bearing royal cartouches, confirm the temple’s long-term ritual importancehttps://www.archaeopress.com/Archaeopress/download/9781805831136. The excavation of the temple has fundamentally altered the interpretation of Gebel el-Silsila, establishing it as a sacred as well as industrial landscape. Continued work has focused on defining its boundaries, documenting architectural elements, and integrating the structure into site management plans for future conservation and presentation.

The team have excavated at the temple over ten seasons and have now confirmed the overall size of the temple (80 x 40 m), the layout, and the dating of construction and later occupation. The temple is situated on a sandstone outcrop, once holding structures build from sandstone, limestone and with details in granite and mudbrick, located along the northern boundary of Gebel el-Silsila east, just below the colonial pump station, and neighbouring the modern canal to the south. The temple borders agriculture land to the east and north, and the River Nile to its west. The main structure has a west-east axis, with its main entrance opening to the west (i.e. from the Nile).

Not much was known about the temple until 2015, when the Mission carried out an initial survey. The initial investigation was based on an early 20th century map, and some notes made by Caminos and Lacovara during the 1980’s. Records prior to the EES epigraphic survey (1955-1984) briefly describe a destroyed Temple of Ramses II based on the occurrence of a block inscribed with the king’s cartouche. Described as a destroyed Ramesside temple on a 1934 published rudimentary map by Egyptologist Ludwig Borchardt after being recorded between 1906 and 1925. The temple was then forgotten and lost.

=== Principal deity Sobek ===
The principal deity of Gebel el-Silsila is Sobek, the god of crocodiles and controller of the waters. Silsila is located within the Ancient Egyptian nome of Kom Ombo (or Ombos), Kom Ombo being 15 km (9.3 mi) to the south or upriver. The Roman coins of the Ombite nome exhibit the crocodile and the effigy of the crocodile-headed god Sobek.

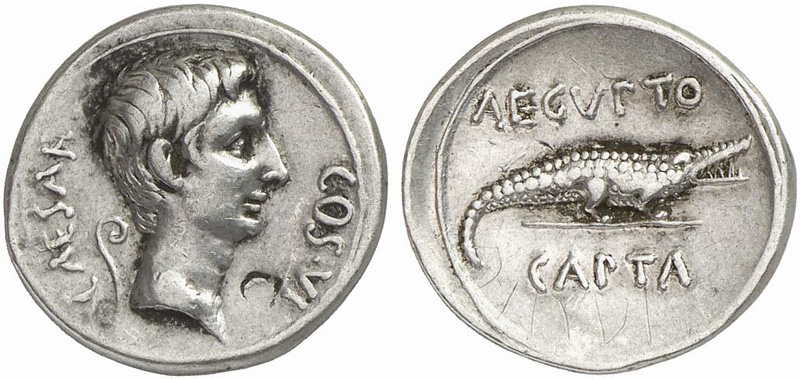
Roman coin Octavianus Aegypto capta from another area depicting a crocodile on reverse and Augustus on the obverse.

== Gebel el-Silsila Epigraphic Survey Project ==
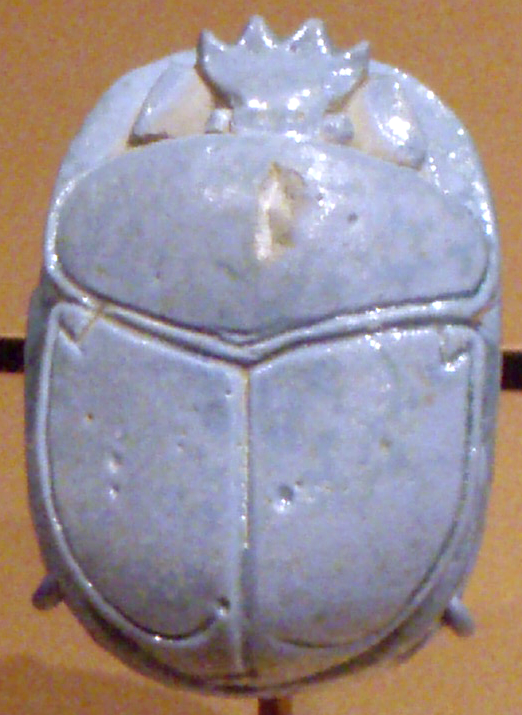
An example blue scarab not from Gebel el-Silsila, this image being the Commemorative Marriage Scarab for Queen Tiye from Amenhotep III. Walters Art Museum, Baltimore.

The area of the Gebel el-Silsila concession is approximately 30km2 in area and incorporates Nag el-Hammam and Shatt el-Rigal. The archaeological evidence from the site dates from Prehistory through to modern times and presents a unique opportunity to study Egypt over a vast timeline. The Gebel el-Silsila Archaeological Project is an international, collaborative and multidisciplinary joint research initiative of the Ministry of Tourism and Antiquities and Lund University, dedicated to the systematic investigation of one of ancient Egypt’s most important yet historically under-explored sites. Gebel el-Silsila was the principal sandstone quarry for Egypt especially during the New Kingdom, supplying stone for some of the most iconic Egyptian temples and monuments, including Karnak, Luxor, and Ramesses’ mortuary complexes. Directed by archaeologist Assoc Prof Dr Maria Nilsson, and the late Assistant Director John Ward (until 2025).

Despite its central role in royal building programs, Gebel el-Silsila was far more than a source of raw material. Recent archaeological research by the Project team has revealed a complex sacred and industrial landscape comprising quarries, shrines, chapels, rock-cut reliefs, settlements, administrative zones, and cemeteries. The site provides rare insight into the lives of quarry workers, priests, administrators, and officials who operated at the intersection of state power, religious practice, and large-scale resource extraction. Established in 2012 under the direction of Egypt’s Ministry of Tourism and Antiquities and Sweden’s Lund University, the project is led by Director Assoc Prof Dr Maria Nilsson, supported by Assistant Director Joanne Derbyshire (from 2025), with the support of 80 international team members and 40 Egyptian workers. The team have conducted 18 seasons so far, with plans for Season 19 and 20 in place. The project employs archaeological methods including excavation, epigraphic recording, bioarchaeology, digital documentation, and conservation. Particular emphasis is placed on sustainable heritage management, site protection, and community engagement.

By examining Gebel el-Silsila as an integrated cultural landscape rather than a single-purpose quarry, the project seeks to transform understanding of ancient Egyptian labour organization, ritual practice, and interaction with the natural environment. In doing so, the Gebel el-Silsila Archaeological Project contributes significantly to broader discussions of monumentality, economy, and daily life in ancient Egypt

Major findings include the systematic recording and analysis of over 5,000 inscriptions, the re-discovery of the New Kingdom Temple of Sobek of Kheny, and the redating of the Speos to the reign of Hatshepsut. The project is also noted for its use of digital archaeology.

The survey project has also found a blue scarab, an amulet depiction of a dung beetle.

== Recent discoveries ==
New Kingdom Necropolis

From 2016 onward, excavation of the necropolis became a central focus of the Gebel el-Silsila Archaeological Mission. The Mission has documented and excavated over 80 burials with inhumations of at least 180 individuals. The 33 individual rock-cut tombs excavated thus far consist of one to two undecorated chambers, with one or more crypts cut into the bedrock floors; some preserved with remains of their original lid. The entrance of the tombs consists of a dressed portcullis/slot-cuts into the door jambs by the entry to the tombs, into which a (stone-) slab would have been placed to seal the door after burial, and possibly to allow for later internment. The tombs are generally accessed via an external quarried/dressed courtyard, followed by a series of steps that descend into the rough-cut squared chamber. None of the chambers are decorated with any inscriptions or iconographic program.

In addition to the rock-cut chambers, the necropolis includes burials in crypts cut into the rock, infant and juvenal burials wrapped in textile or reed and placed in natural fissures or cliff overhangs, sometimes covered with bricks and with cist-like constructions. All chamber tombs excavated so far by the Mission have been looted and left open, most since antiquity. Those that were looted during antiquity have since covered by up to 3m of Nile silt, blown in sand, and fallen quarry spoil and debris. They have been in a very poor state of preservation since antiquity.

The burial population included women, children, and infants, alongside adult males. The funerary evidence demonstrates that Gebel el‑Silsila supported a settled or semi‑permanent community, not just temporary quarry workers.

Bioarchaeological analysis by the Mission shows high infant and child mortality, typical of ancient populations, the presence of adult female burials and burials arranged in small clusters rather than isolated individual graves. These findings strongly suggest family units living at or near the quarry, rather than a workforce composed solely of rotating labour gangs. In several cases, women and children were buried in proximity to male individuals, reinforcing interpretations of household‑based occupation.

Sphinxes At Silsila In February in 2019, joint Swedish-Egyptian archaeologists revealed a 16.4-feet longs and 11.5-feet high ram-headed sphinx (or a criosphinx) carved from sandstone dated back to the reign of Amenhotep III. In addition to this finding, an "uraeus" or wrapped cobra symbol and hundreds of stone fragment engraved with hieroglyphs were also found.

== Climate ==
The present-day climate of Gebel el-Silsila is extremely clear, dry, bright, and sunny year-round, in all seasons, with low seasonal variation, and with about 4,000 hours of annual sunshine, very close to the maximum theoretical sunshine duration. Silsila is located in one of the sunniest regions on Earth.

The Köppen-Geiger climate classification system classifies the weather of Gebel el-Silsila as a hot desert climate (BWh), like the rest of Egypt.

Winters are short, brief, and extremely warm. Wintertime is very pleasant and enjoyable while summertime is unbearably hot with blazing sunshine, made only more bearable because the desert air is dry.

The climate of Silsila is extremely dry year-round, with less than 1 mm of average annual precipitation. The desert locale is one of the driest ones in the world, and rainfall does not occur every year. The air is mainly dry here and becomes drier southward and upriver towards Aswan. The air becomes more humid northward and downriver towards Luxor.

== See also ==
Regarding quarrying

- Stone quarries of ancient Egypt
- Gebel el-Haridi

Regarding Sobek or religion

- Ammit
- Faiyum
- Ancient Egyptian religion

Other

- Cultural tourism in Egypt
- List of ancient Egyptian sites
- List of megalithic sites
- Outline of ancient Egypt
- Glossary of ancient Egypt artifacts
- Index of ancient Egypt-related articles
