= Unfinished obelisk =

Ancient Egyptian obelisk

The unfinished obelisk is the largest known ancient obelisk and is located in the northern region of the stone quarries of ancient Egypt in Aswan, Egypt. It was studied in detail by Reginald Engelbach in 1922. Given the name Unfinished, the Obelisk is still in its situ, its original location, never lifted or transported to this day, granting us the ability to view an obelisk still in a state of construction. The obelisk has three open sides, top and sides, the bottom is still connected to the ground, showing it was still far from full completion. As well as large, visible fissures that prompted the abandonment of the project.

Reginald Engelbach and other Egyptologist have an acceptance that the Obelisk was create during the 18th Dynasty, under the reign of Pharaoh Hatshepsut. (1479~1458 BCE) The unfinished Obelisk, from end to end, is measured to be 41.75 meters long and weighs 1168 tons and is made up of granite from the quarry itself. The obelisk also has multiple markings on them, markings created by the workers, both for times of leisure and processed work, like the circle withe line in the middle, next to the star shaped figure.

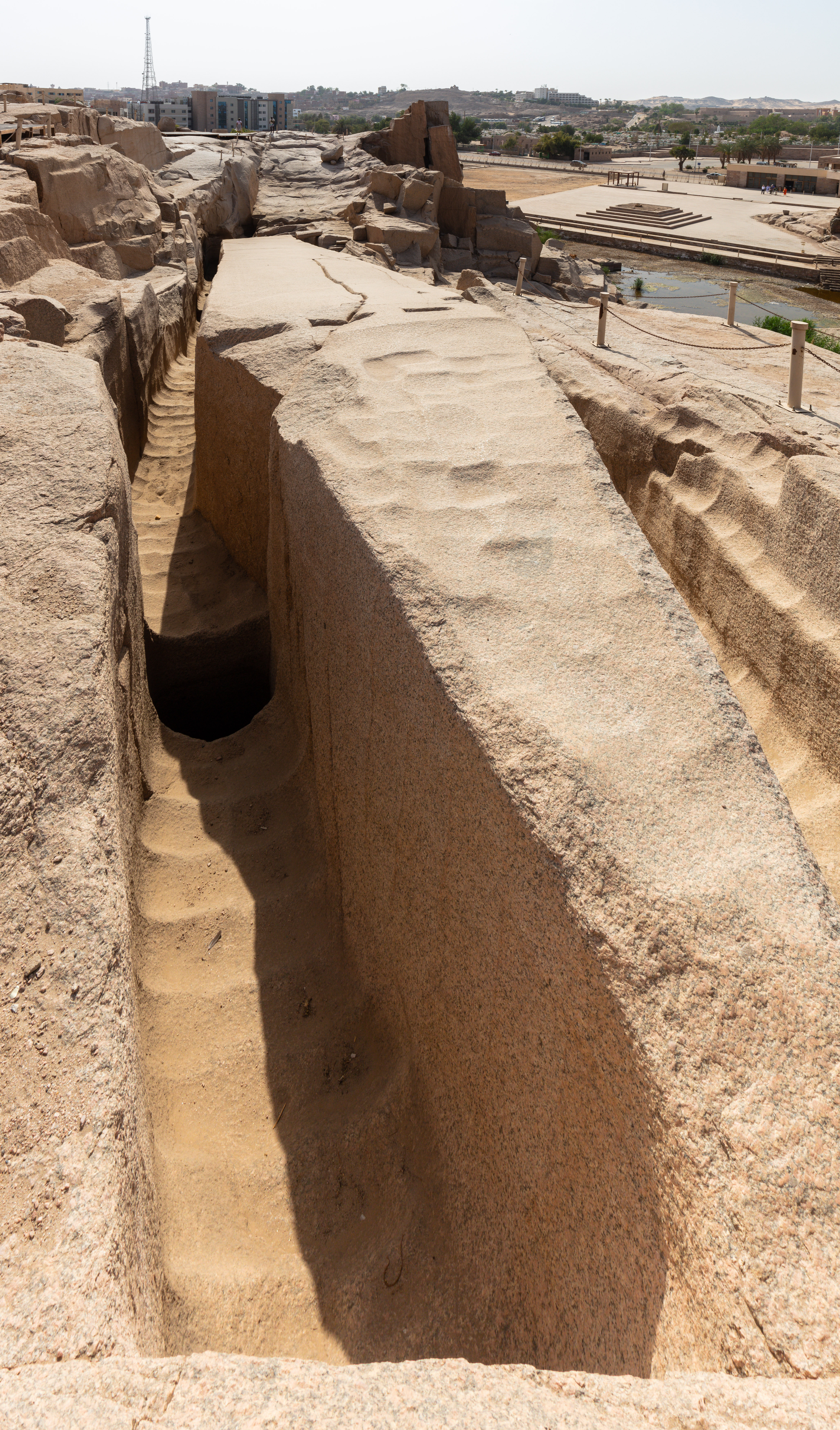
The unfinished obelisk in its quarry at Aswan, 2022

== The Obelisk ==
=== Construction ===
The construction of the unfinished obelisk was a tedious process. First, they would have had to remove any foreign objects from the ground that weren't granite or weakened granite. Possible methods would have been a burn cool style method, by setting the location of fire, any material that isn't able to withstand the blazing heat and then the rapid cooling of water will be burned and eroded away, until all that remains is the pure granite, ready to be worked with. With the granite now ready, the shaping of the Obelisk is next, where trenches will be built to separate the Granite from the earth, that would be 4 sides, but given the unfinished state, the Unfinished obelisk only had 3 sides, the top, and the sides. The bottom is still connected to the ground. The 2 sides, left and right would have gaps, trenches around 75 centimeters long by 60 centimeters wide, this was enough space for the average workers to have enough room for them to work.

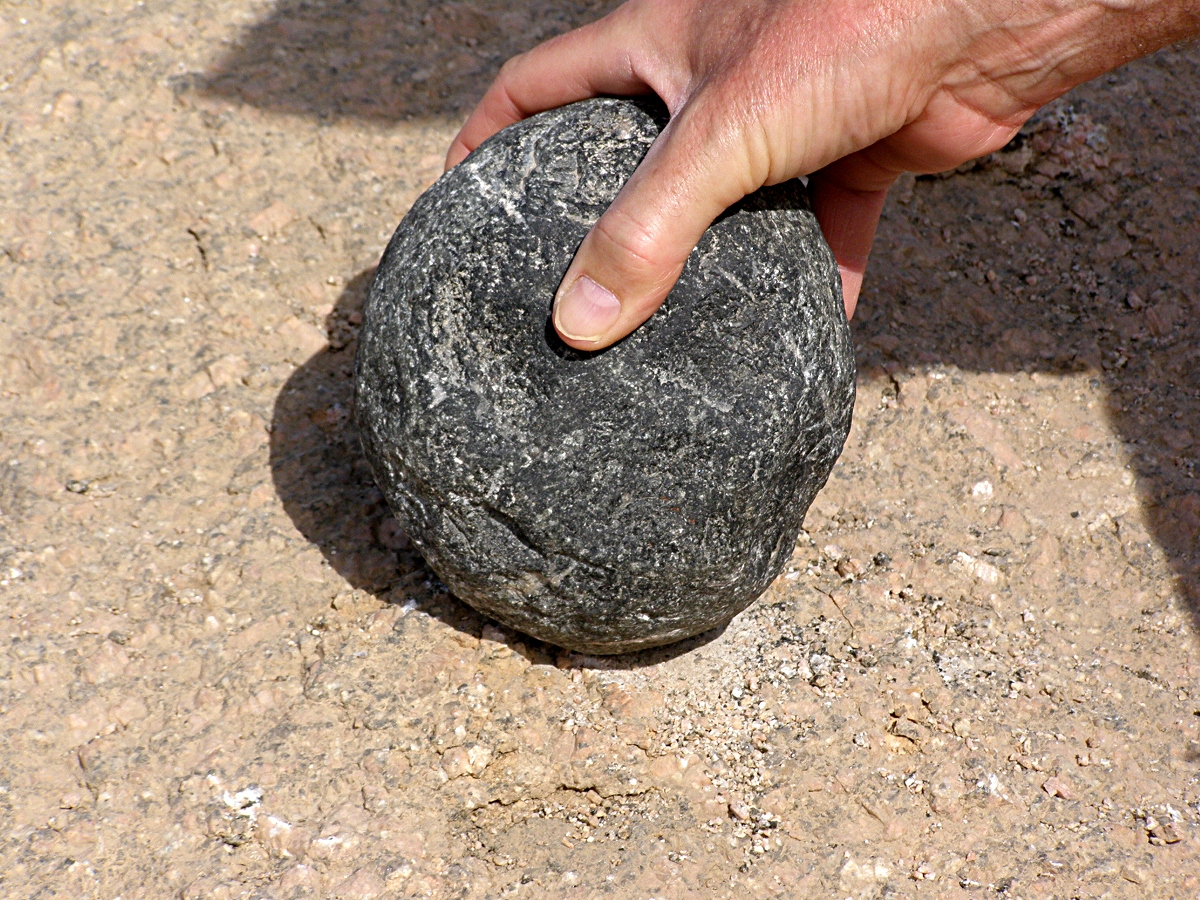
One of the diorite spheres (Pounders)

Photo of Diorite sphere marks still visible on the Unfinished Obelisk

These gap trenches were made in a different way than soft rock chisel and cutting method. The quarry here is granite, meaning it's not soft stone like Sandstone that is able to be cut with tools like chisels that can wedge in and cut trenches for the workers. For hardstone locations like that had granite, the use of another tool called the diorite balls/spheres, or "pounders" as Engelbach calls them. These spheres made of diorite weighed about 9-15 pounds and had a diameter of 8-13 inches. Granted by the name Engelbach called them "pounders" they helped in the creation of the trenches by being thrown on the floor, grinding the granite to dust. Repeating the process over and over with multiple of these balls again in the same area, and the trenches will be made.

A cubit rod that would have worked similar to those used by foremen.

As the trench is made, it is measured every 75 centimeters by a red line. These red lines would measure how much progress is made over time. These red lines would have red triangles around the same level for each red horizontal line made and measured by the foreman of the workers using cubit rods, similar to modern day yardsticks in order to measure where the workers, where to stop and where to begin. This potentially is a likely way to keep the workers from working too fast and being uneven with their neighbors, and/or checking if anyone needs to be replaced in order to keep the construction working smoothly.

With this long process of cutting the sides and top side into the perfect position, next would come the difficult part of the construction, separating the bottom from the earth which would require massive much more trench building due to the size and scale of the Obelisk. However, as the name implies, the unfinished Obelisk never reached that point of its construction as it is still connected to the ground to this day.

=== The stoppage ===
From the start of the Obelisk, the issues that would lead to the abandonment of the construction were always there. These issues were cracks and fissures in the granite, which posed severe risks. These risks would ultimately lead to the stoppage of the construction and to abandon it. Natural cracks were bound to happen; the use of a durable weighted balls (The diorite spheres) dropped on these areas may have been see if these cracks led to deeper fissures. Ultimately these major cracks would turn into fissures, most of the major fissures were on the top area of the obelisk. However, there is one fissure near the bottom that completely separates that portion from the rest.

=== Length ===
The unfinished obelisk lays at a massive length of 41.75 meters long (137 feet). It is unknown to this day who wanted the Obelisk constructed in the first place. The best guess and idea that Engelbach had on the date is that it may have been constructed under the orders of Hatshepsut in the New Kingdom. But this claim is only a speculation, as Engelbach mentions one massive obelisk planned during Hatshepsut's reign was to be 56.7 meters long, or 108 cubits in ancient Egypt terms. Much longer than the unfinished Obelisk, which is the largest ever made in ancient Egypt. Whether this is obelisk wanted during Hatshepsut, however scaled down due to reasons unknown, are still mysteries.

=== Material ===
Given the estimated date of its start of creation, that puts the Obelisk during the, that puts it at the 18th dynasty in the New Kingdom. (1550 BC-1292BC)

The Unfinished Obelisk, (And most other Obelisks), are created with one giant block of Granite in the quarry's itself. The unfinished Obelisk grants us the ability to see how this production works as it's still embedded in the ground.

At the time of the New Kingdom, specifically the 18th Dynasty itself, this is the period when Granite started to be mined again in high proportions in the quarries. The time when archeologists have begun to find more and more obelisks being created at this time. The Unfinished Obelisk being a part of those groups of obelisks.

== Marks ==
Throughout every ancient quarry, marks have been reported seen. Though the quarry that holds the Unfinished Obelisks has been reported to have the most of these marks than any of the other quarries ever did. The marks ranges from multiple Sketches, 2 Geometric figures, Dates, work level lines, and Greek names

=== Sketches ===
The sketches hold no structural value to the Obelisk; they don't produce data or retain production quality/lists of material used. The sketches reveal a much larger picture of Egyptian workers; they created these marks in their spare time, their free time when they weren't working on the obelisk, to have a reminder that they were here, that they were the ones to complete (Attempted as they had no foresight that it would be abandoned) this major project.

These sketches ranged from 4-5 different artistical images.

- Ostrich
- Obelisk and Boats
- Dolphins
- Bes (The dwarf god)

A photo of the Ostrich sketches on the quarry wall

==== Ostrich ====
The Ostrich's marks were found on the East side of the quarry faces came in different sizes but relatively all the same shape. They were colored red and all faced the east, (possibility of facing the sun rise?), due to the position of the obelisk, which laid 18.5 degrees north of east.

In southern Aswan, the Ostrich was quite the common sight, workers than come the quarry would have seen some.

==== Obelisk and Boats ====
The Obelisk and Boat drawings had a more literal connection with the Aswan Quarry and Obelisk; to build structures in ancient Egypt, the quarries were the producers. But to transport them, the Ancient Egyptians obvious needed Boats that traveled the Nile to get the refined building material and completed Obelisks to their destinations.

There were 3 areas where these sketches were found, one to the direct west of the Ostrich sketches, where 2 different sized Obelisks painted red surrounded by black painted boats, some having what looks to ropes and material on them, enforcing the relationship once more. In the same area, but at the top, a small Obelisk was made, this one in black, also noted aside from being small, sketched out rough. In the far south of the quarry, another Obelisk in red is created, standing, with a possible indication to let those who enter the Aswan quarry that this place is where Obelisks are made for the kingdom.

==== Dolphins ====
Dolphins is an interesting choice as; the Aswan quarry is incredibly far from any body of water that Dolphins would inhabit. Dolphins don't live in the Nile, the closest areas that they would live in is the Mediterranean and the Red Sea. Both bodies are water that are vastly distant travels from Aswan.

2 interpretations why Dolphin sketches would be here have been popular. The nearby city of Mendes, which houses the cult Hatmehit, chief of fishes, who has taken form of a dolphin. The second interpretation is simply travel, workers that worked in the Aswan quarries may have once been to the red sea, they saw Dolphins, and simply decided to draw them on the quarry faces when they had the time.

=== Bes (The dwarf god) ===
A single sketch of Bes was found. Bes' role is the God of protection and fun. Having his sketch there would imply that the workers prayed for safety, potentially from wild animals and potential hostile groups (Raiders, robbers, etc) as well as fun, (Breaks, good fortune, etc).

The sketch however was found in bisected pieces, the bottom half still situ (Original place), but the upper half was found southeast area of the quarry, with Roman wedges in it. Indicating that even up to the Roman times, the Aswan quarry may have still been being quarried for its material.

=== Geometric figures ===
Near one of the major fissures, these are the only geometric figures that are on the obelisk. The circle with a line and the star shaped figure, both colored red, are both still mysterious, yet they pointed clearly at the fissure, definitively as a warning as construction continues.

== Bibliography ==
- "The Aswân Obelisk with some Remarks on the Ancient Engineering; by R. Engelbach; a Project Gutenberg ebook". www.gutenberg.org. Archived from the original on 2026-10-09.
- Kelany, Adel. 2011 "Marks of the Quarry workers at the unfinished Obelisk Quarry, Aswan, Egypt: Preliminary Report"
- "Arnold 1991 Building in Egypt, Pharaonic Stone Masonry.pdf" (PDF). Dropbox.
