= Shellal =

Human settlement in Egypt

Coordinates: 24°03′00″N 32°53′00″E

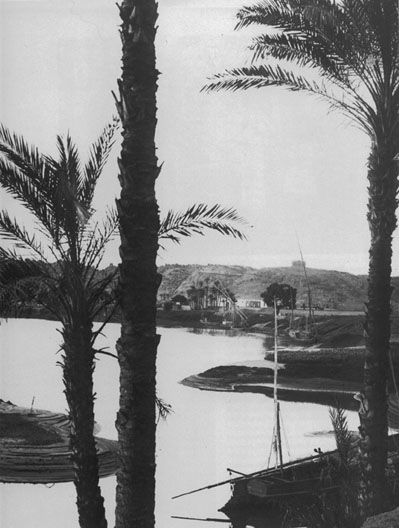
"The river Nile at Shellal, photograph taken in the late afternoon on the 15th of February 1891." Photo: Queen Victoria of Sweden. Egypt, 1891.

Shellal (Arabic: شلاّل) is a small ancient village on the banks of the Nile, south of Aswan in Upper Egypt. It was the traditional northern frontier of the Nubian region with both the Egyptian Empire and the Roman Empire. During the period of ancient Egypt, it was a very important quarry area for granite production. A canal was excavated in the vicinity of Shellal under Merenre Nemtyemsaf I during the Old Kingdom period in order to facilitate the navigation of the first-cataract of the Nile. This canal was restored under Senusret III in the Middle Kingdom period Nowadays it is possible to see some unfinished granite works on the site (that is soon to become an open-air museum); some of the objects on display include incomplete statues of Osiris and Ramesses II and unfinished Roman baths.

Shellal was mentioned in a text dating from the 6th century AD where the king of Nobatia prides himself on having driven Blemmyes out from his country northwards from Ibrim to Shellal, on the frontier with Roman Egypt.

It was also an important city during the Muslim Arab early domination; in particular there are some ancient minarets dating from the 11th century that are now submerged under the waters of Lake Nasser. These minarets are known to reflect the direct influence of the Hijaz region of Arabia, rather that the domination of the powers of Lower Egypt.

== Transport ==
During the 19th century, the Luxor-Aswan railroad line was connected with a narrow-gauge line from Aswan to Shellal which had been constructed in 1884 by the British as a military line during the first Sudan Campaign to accelerate transport of military stores past the First Cataract. Later the final southern station in the Egyptian railroad network was converted to standard gauge.

In the late 19th century, Victoria of Baden, Queen Victoria of Sweden, visited Egypt and traveled south to Shellal where she took a now famous photograph of the site on the late afternoon of 15 February 1891. The photograph is the first known graphic document in existence, depicting the waters of the Nile at Shellal.

Today Shellal has a small port where boats depart to the near Philae temple and has a small market where the shopkeepers wait for the tourists returning from the temple.
