= TT106 =

Theban tomb

Theban tomb TT106
- Burial site of Paser
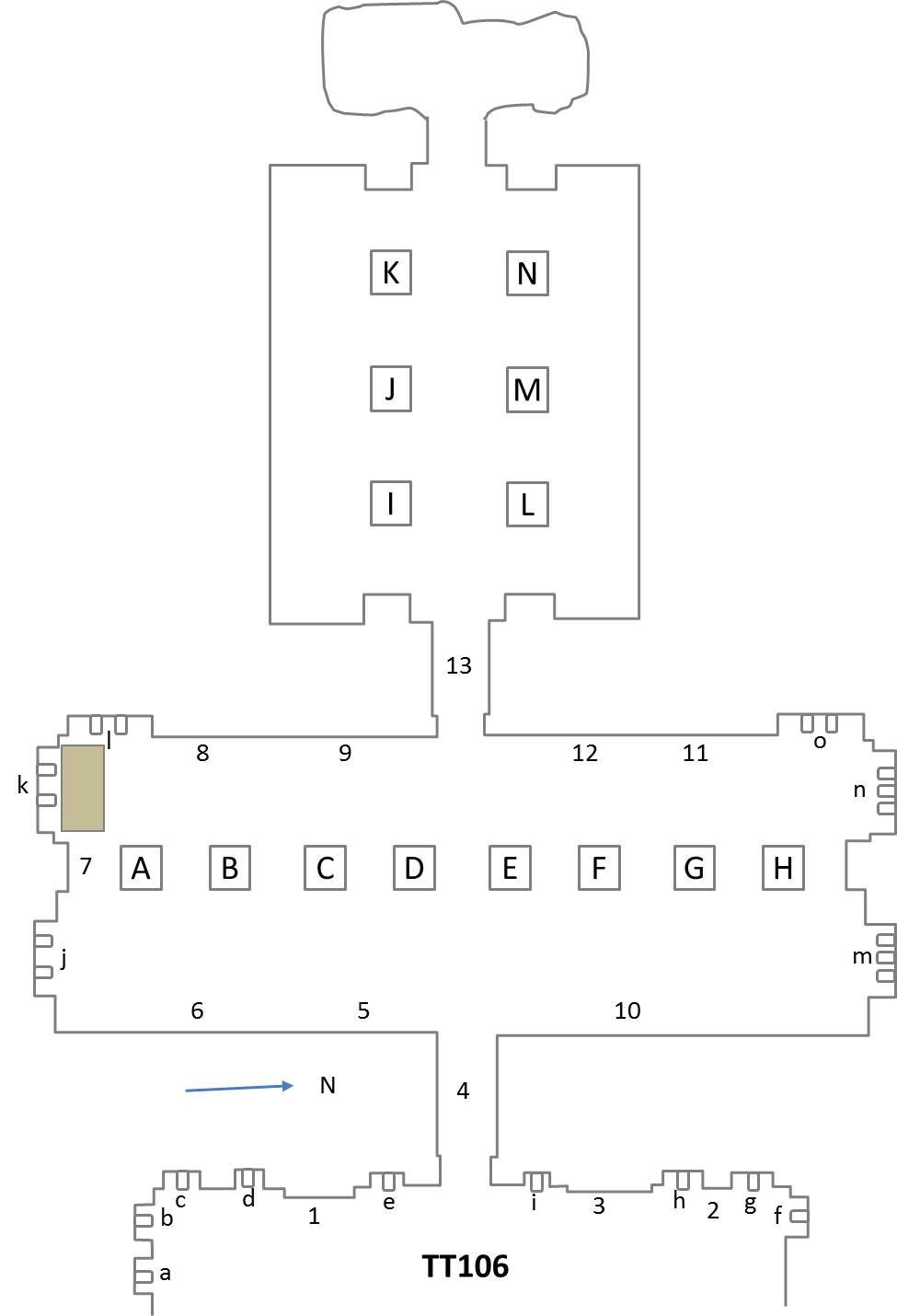

- Location within Egypt
- Location: Sheikh Abd el-Qurna, Theban Necropolis
- ← Previous; TT105 Next → TT107

The Theban Tomb TT106 is located in Sheikh Abd el-Qurna. It forms part of the Theban Necropolis, situated on the west bank of the Nile opposite Luxor. The tomb is the burial place of the ancient Egyptian noble and Vizier, Paser.

== See also ==
- List of Theban tombs
