= Paser (vizier) =

Vizier and High Priest of Amun

- Vizier of the South, High Priest of Amun
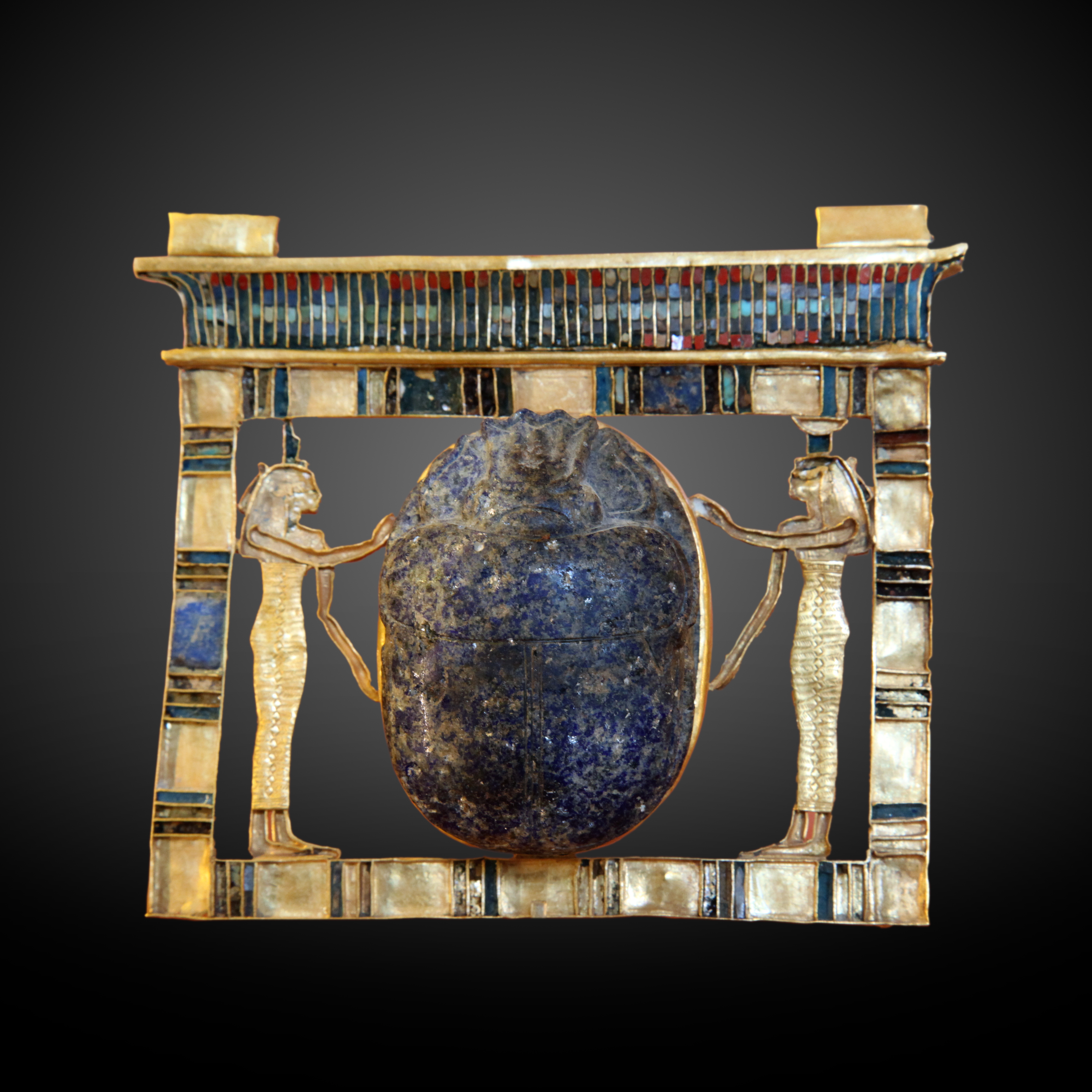
- Pectoral inscribed with the name of Paser
Egyptian name
pA sr A52
- Predecessor: Hori
- Successor: Bakenkhonsu
- Dynasty: 19th Dynasty
- Pharaoh: Ramesses II
- Burial: TT106 in Thebes
- Father: Nebneteru Tenry
- Mother: Merytre

Paser was an ancient Egyptian noble who served as vizier during the reigns of Seti I and Ramesses II in the 19th Dynasty. He would later also become High Priest of Amun.

== Family ==
Paser was the son of Nebneteru Tenry, who was High Priest of Amun and Merytre who was Chief of the Harem of Amun. His maternal grandparents are named in his tomb as Aniy and Naia, who apparently came from Memphis.

In Paser's tomb a brother Tatia, Steward in the Temple of Maat, is mentioned.

== Life ==
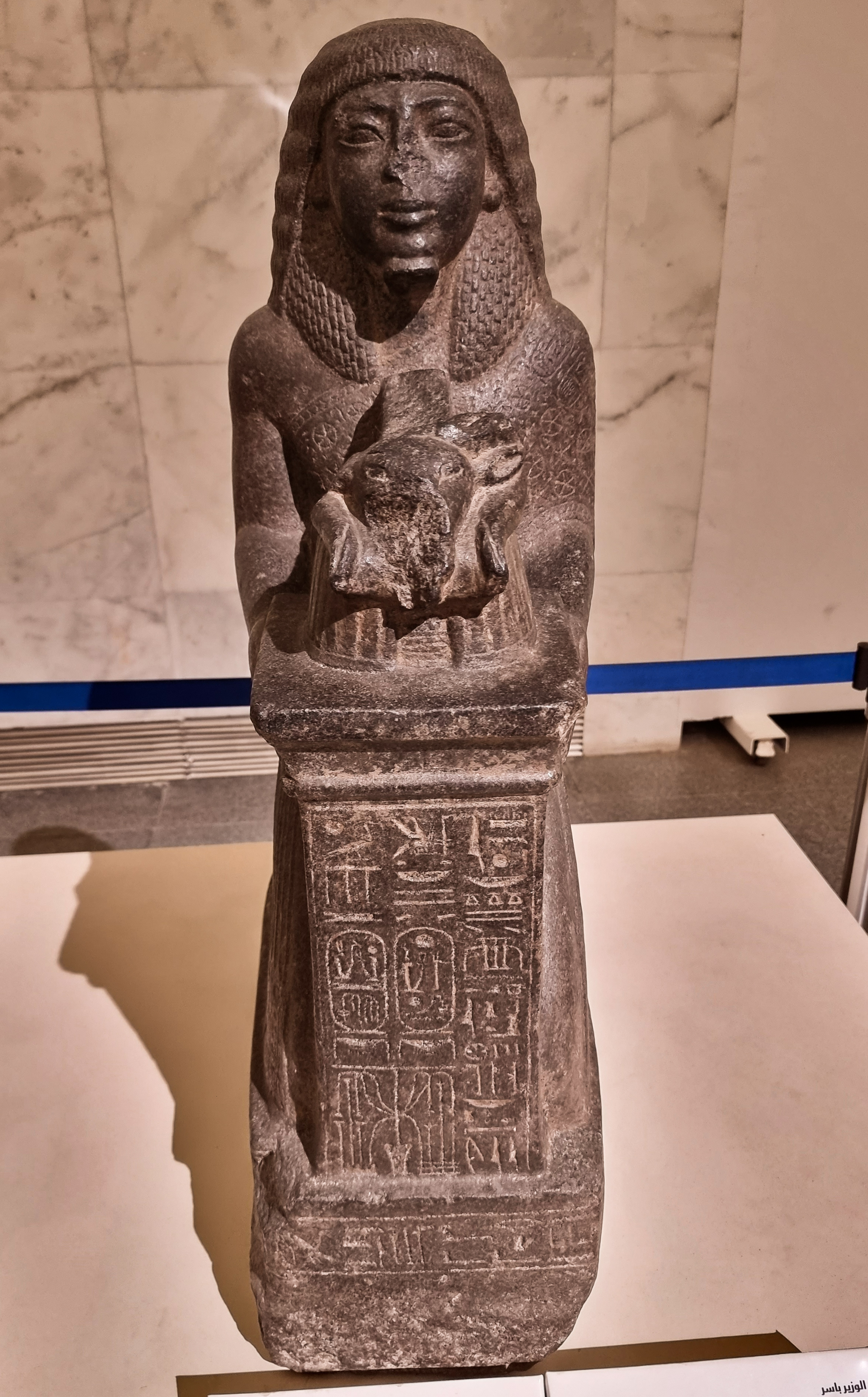
Statue of Paser (CG 42156)

Paser was part of the close entourage of Seti I's son, the then Prince Ramesses, and a hereditary Prince and Count.

Paser held many titles and honors throughout his life. The autobiographical text in Paser's tomb tells us that Menmaatre, i.e. Seti I, elevated Paser to the rank of first companion of the palace, and later promoted him to be chief chamberlain of the Lord of Both Lands and high priest of Great of Magic (Werethekau). Eventually Seti I appointed Paser to be city-governor and vizier. Paser received the tribute of the foreign lands for his king, and he was sent throughout Egypt to calculate the revenue. When Ramesses II took the throne he reappointed Paser as chief chamberlain of the Lord of Both Lands, high priest of Great of Magic and vizier. Among his major works was the construction of the tomb of Seti I in the Valley of the Kings.

Paser held an array of other titles as well according to inscriptions on statues and monuments. He was a dignitary and judge, mouth of Nekhen, prophet of Maat, seal-bearer of the King of Upper and Lower Egypt, superintendent of every work of the king, chief of secrets of the hieroglyphs, etc.

Paser is last attested as vizier in year 21 of Ramesses II, and he may have held this office during the reigns of Seti I and Ramesses II for over 25 years. Eventually Ramesses II appointed Paser as High Priest of Amun in Thebes. A statue of Paser giving his title as high priest was found in the Karnak Cachette. The statue is now in the Cairo Museum (CGC 42156). Paser is said to be a noble and count, the High Priest of Amun, and the superintendent of prophets of all (Theban) gods. A shabti for the high priest Paser is in the University College, London collection.

== Monuments and other attestations ==
Paser is known from many monuments and from statuary. His tomb (TT106) is described below.

A stamped brick (Museo Arch. Nazionale/Museo Egizio) can be found on the Global Egyptian Museum Site. The text reads:

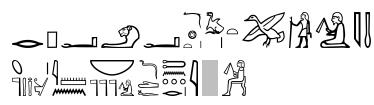
r-pat hAty-a n niwt PAsr mAa-xrw sA tpy n Hm nTr Imn NbnTrw Dd-f Tnry Hereditary Prince and Count, Paser, justified, son of the First Prophet of Amun, Nebneteru, called Tjenry

Monuments naming Paser come from all over Egypt. There are a handful of items for which the provenance is unknown. For instance, a grey-granite statue holding a stela belongs to Paser, as does a black granite squatting statue now in the British Museum (BM 510). Wilbour reports seeing a statue of Paser at Tell Roba. For other objects we do know where they were from and some of these are outlined below.

=== Pi-Ramesse ===
- A door lintel shows Paser adoring King Ramesses II. Paser is given the titles hereditary noble and count, god's father, sem-priest, city-governor and vizier.
- A statue showing Paser holding a Stela, now in the Louvre (E 25980). Figures of Werethekau, Sekhmet, Ptah and Neith are deities included on the statue. This statue dates to the time that Paser was vizier. Several other titles are included.
- An amulet in the shape of a stela was found in Tanis, but originally came from Pi-Ramesses. The vizier is shown adoring King Ramesses II.

=== Memphis and Middle Egypt ===
- A statue with Ptah from the Temple of Ptah in Memphis is now in the Cairo Museum (CGC 630). Besides the title of vizier, Paser is also said to be the Ruler with the Bat-sceptre in the Mansion of Sekhmet, Superintendent of all treasures of the King, Eyes of the King in the entire land, who brings contentment to the Two Lands for his master, Ears of the King in his Palace and several more titles. Paser's parents are mentioned. Nebneteru Tenry is said to be High Priest of Amun in Southern Heliopolis and Sem-priest in the Temple of Ptah. His mother Merytre is said to be of Hatkuptah (Memphis).
- An ivory pen-case (?) from Abydos, now in the Liverpool Museum (No 24.9.00.92) is inscribed for the Vizier Paser.

=== Medamud and Eastern Thebes ===
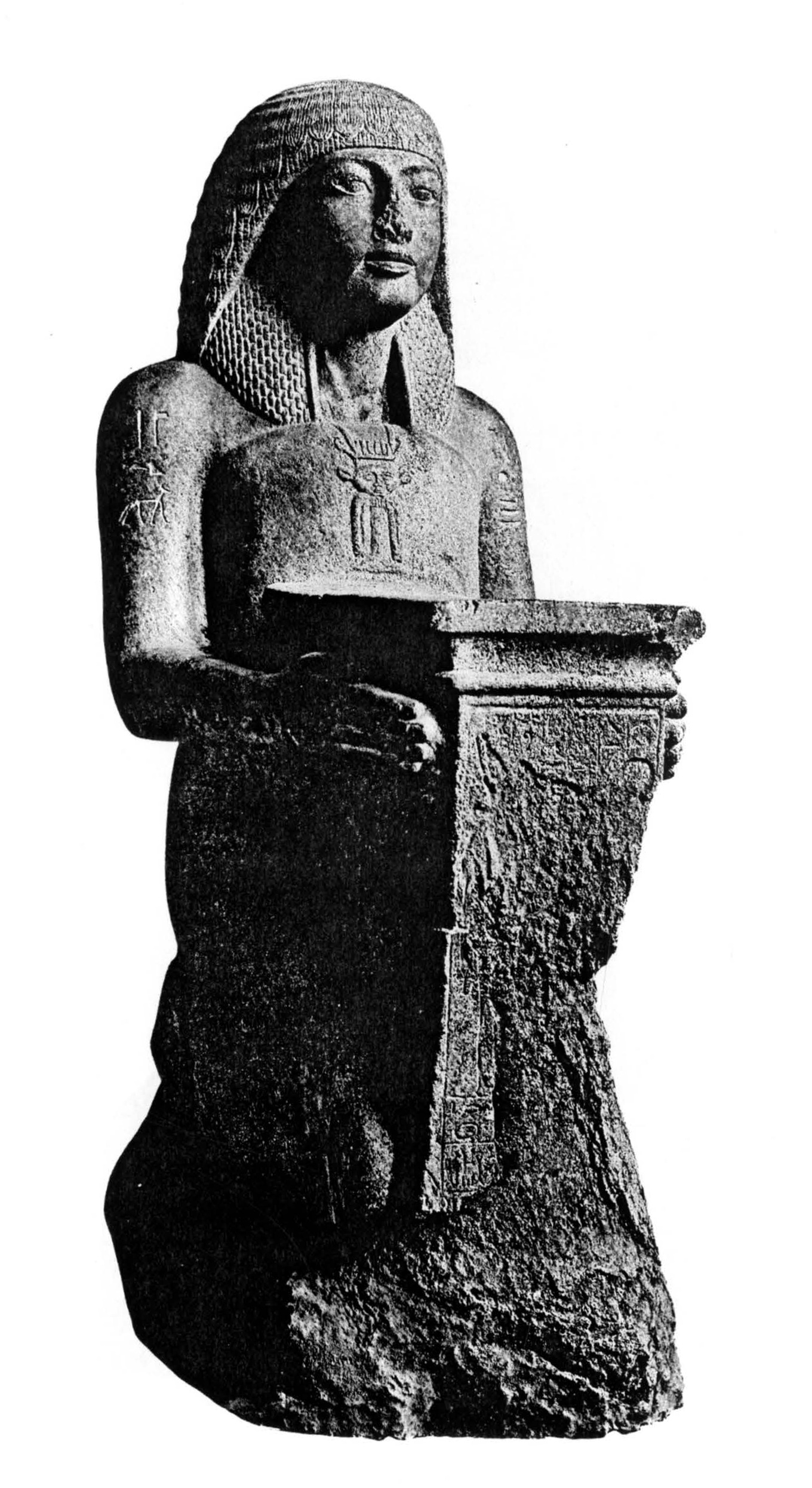
Statue of Paser (CG 42164)

Three statues of Paser come from this area. All three depict the Vizier Paser.

- Seated Statue from Medamud, now in the British Museum (BM 954).
- A black granite block statue from the Karnak Cachette, now in the Cairo Museum (JdE 38062)
- A block statue from the Karnak Cachette, now in the Cairo Museum (CGC 42164)

=== Western Thebes, Excluding Deir el-Medina ===
Four statues of Paser were found in this area. Three came from Deir el-Bahari and the fourth one is thought to come from somewhere in Thebes.

- Large statue from the Mentuhotep Temple in Deir el-Bahari (UM E.534+)
- Lesser statue from the Mentuhotep Temple in Deir el-Bahari, now in the British Museum (BM 678)
- A double statue of Paser and his mother from Deir el-Bahari, now in the Cairo Museum (CGC 561)
- A statue of Paser likely from Thebes, now in the Glyptothek in Copenhagen (AEIN 50)

In Western Thebes several pieces of graffito are known mentioning Paser. Two pieces of rock-graffito depict Ramesses II before the goddess Hathor, and mention the Vizier Paser. Graffito in Tomb 93 (TT93), the tomb of Kenamun from the reign of Amenhotep II, mentions Paser. Graffito in Tomb 311, the tomb of Khety a treasurer from the 11th Dynasty, mentions a visit of Paser who went to " .. see ... the works ... of his (distant) forefather, Khety ..."

A votive stela from Western Thebes shows Paser and his mother Merytre adoring Wenennufer, and a stela from Thebes, now in Copenhagen (AEIN 1553), show Paser and his father Nebneteru Tenry before Hathor. This stela was dedicated by a Servant in the Place of Truth.

In the tomb chapel of Penbui (TT10 Paser is shown next to Ramses II.

=== Deir el-Medina ===
Paser is well attested in Deir el-Medina. About ten stelae are known often showing Paser with King Ramesses II before different deities. Two of the stelae show Paser with the tomb-scribe Ramose who was the main scribe in Deir el-Medina.

Further items from Deir el-Medina include statuary, lintels, cornice fragments, (statue?) bases and finally letters between Paser and the scribes. There is a letter from the scribe Ramose mentioning two other scribes named Huy and Aa. A letter from the scribe Inu(?)shefnu recording how the wages for the people working on the tombs was received and delivered. A letter from the scribe Mose mentions an inspection by the granary chief Kheriuf. The scribe Nebre writes to Paser to inform him that the Pharaoh's Village is in excellent order.

=== Upper Egypt ===
A chapel of Paser is located in West Silsila in the Horemheb Speos. Paser is given the titles Noble and count, Judge and dignitary, Mouth of Nekhen, Prophet of Maat and City-Governor and Vizier. He is also said to be the Superintendent of Prophets of all the gods in Upper and Lower Egypt.

== Tomb ==
He was buried in a TT106, located in the Sheikh Abd el-Qurna, opposite Luxor, in Egypt. The exterior facade of the tomb includes the cartouche of Ramesses II. Scenes include Paser and his mother Merytre as mummies and a canopic shrine with its jars being libated by his brother Titia.

Several pillars in the hall are decorated. Paser is shown before Amenhotep I and Ahmose Nefertari. On the same pillar Paser's brother Titia is depicted again offering before Paser and his mother Merytre. Another pillar depicts Paser and his parents worshipping the Gods. There are scenes before Osiris and Maat, his parents before Wenennufer, and Paser participating in a Valley Festival, praising Re and Amun.

The texts include a hymn to Osiris, the Song of the Harper, a biographical text and praise of King Ramesses II.

Funerary objects include two canopic jars, which are now in the Cairo Museum (CGC 4325 and 4326). One of the jars shows Selqet and Duamutef, the other Isis and Qebehsenuf. A shabti for Paser is now in the collection in Berlin (Berlin 367), while three other shabtis are in the collection of University College in London (nos 93-94-95).
