= End of the 19th Dynasty =

Period of Ancient Egypt

- Part of Bronze Age collapse
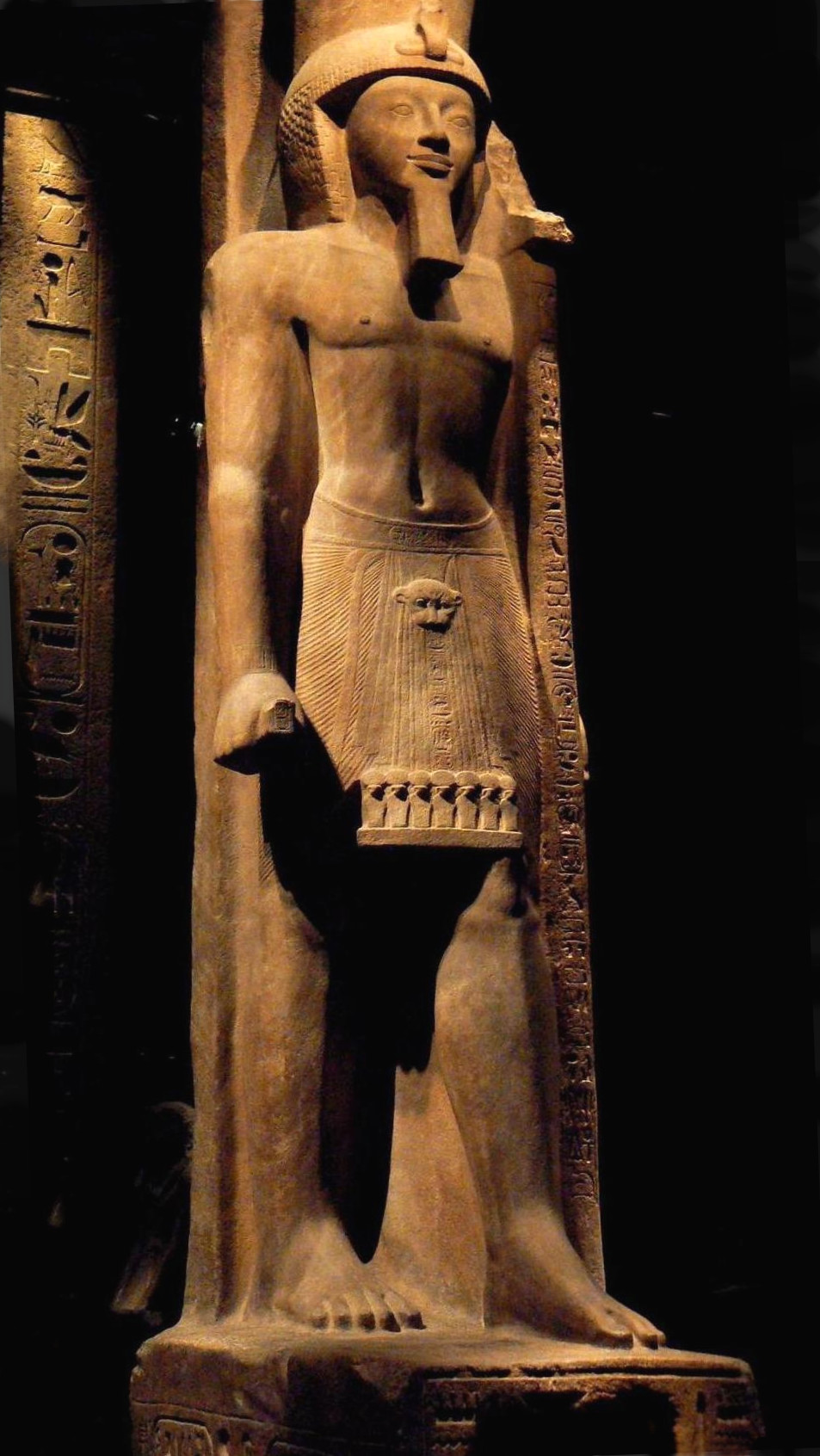
- Seti II, the last unquestioned ruler of 19th dynasty Egypt
Date	c. 1203–1187 BC
Location	New Kingdom Egypt
Result	Eventual 20th Dynasty victory; Phase 1: Seti/Tausret victory; Phase 2: Setnakhte victory

Belligerents
Seti II and his supporters: Tausret succeeds Seti II as de facto ruler, after Seti dies; Chancellor Bay	Amenmesse and his supporters (Contested the throne in phase 1): Viceroy Khaemtjitry	Setnakhte (became a prominent in phase 2)
- This period of conflicts contributed to the eventual long-lasting decline of the New Kingdom, since the victorious 20th Dynasty would never recover the former status of the preceding New Kingdom dynasties.

The end of the 19th Dynasty of Ancient Egypt is a period of short-reigning rulers c. 1203–1187 BC. After the death of Merneptah, there was a conflict for the throne between Seti II and Amenmesse, which eventually resulted in the victory of Seti II. Seti II's reign was short, as he died within a year of regaining power. His widow, Tausret, took control with the support of Bay and the puppet Pharaoh Siptah. However, Tausret later eliminated Bay, and Siptah died under mysterious circumstances. This soon triggered a new power struggle between Tausret and Setnakhte. The struggle culminated in the triumph of Setnakhte, who is now remembered as the founder of the 20th Dynasty.

== Background ==
During his lifetime, Ramesses II led several famous military battles and campaigns, including conflicts with the Libyans and Hittites, notably the Battle of Kadesh. He also oversaw diplomatic efforts such as the Egyptian–Hittite peace treaty and the relocation of the Egyptian capital to Pi-Ramesses. Ramesses the Great achieved great things and is often regarded as Egypt's greatest Pharaoh. He had a long life with numerous heirs who were given prominent positions in the government as generals, governors, scribes and more. Ramesses II fathered around 100 children and reigned as the third ruler of the Nineteenth Dynasty. He even outlived his first heir, also named Ramesses, and decentralised power among many members of the royal family.

Aidan Dodson argues that Ramesses the Great bears responsibility for the power struggles. He extended the concept of the "royal family" beyond previous rulers by not only granting titles to his descendants, but also publicly presenting them as royalty. In addition, he had several first or great wives, causing confusion in the order of succession as to which eldest son would inherit the throne. It is in this context that the upheavals of the second half of the 19th Dynasty and beyond should be understood.

Ramesses the Great was eventually succeeded by his son Merneptah, who was probably elderly by this time. During his reign, Merneptah led military campaigns against Egypt's enemies. In the fifth year of his reign, he faced the Libyans and their king Mereye. He also encountered the mysterious Sea Peoples, marking the beginning of the collapse of the Bronze Age. However, according to Ian Shaw, the rest of Merneptah's reign seems to have been relatively peaceful. He died in the 9th (according to Ian Shaw), 11th (according to Dodson) or 12th (according to Vivienne Gae Callender) year of his reign, after having settled the borders of Egypt. His death triggered a war of succession, as he had designated his son Seti II as his successor.

=== Military reforms during the New Kingdom ===
Ramesses II expanded the Egyptian military by adding a new division ("Mesha") called "Set" in the new capital. This made a total of four divisions: "Amun" in Thebes, "Re" in Heliopolis, "Ptah" in Memphis, and the new "Set" division in the capital. Each division had about 5,000 soldiers and was further divided into 20 companies ("sa") or chariot squadrons. Each company had 250 soldiers or 50 chariots in a squadron, which were further divided into 5 platoons. This organisation made the New Kingdom armies more professional and organised than the Middle Kingdom armies, which relied more on conscripts. The military structure of the New Kingdom was similar to modern armies, and these four divisions later took part in the Battle of Kadesh.

=== Claimants ===
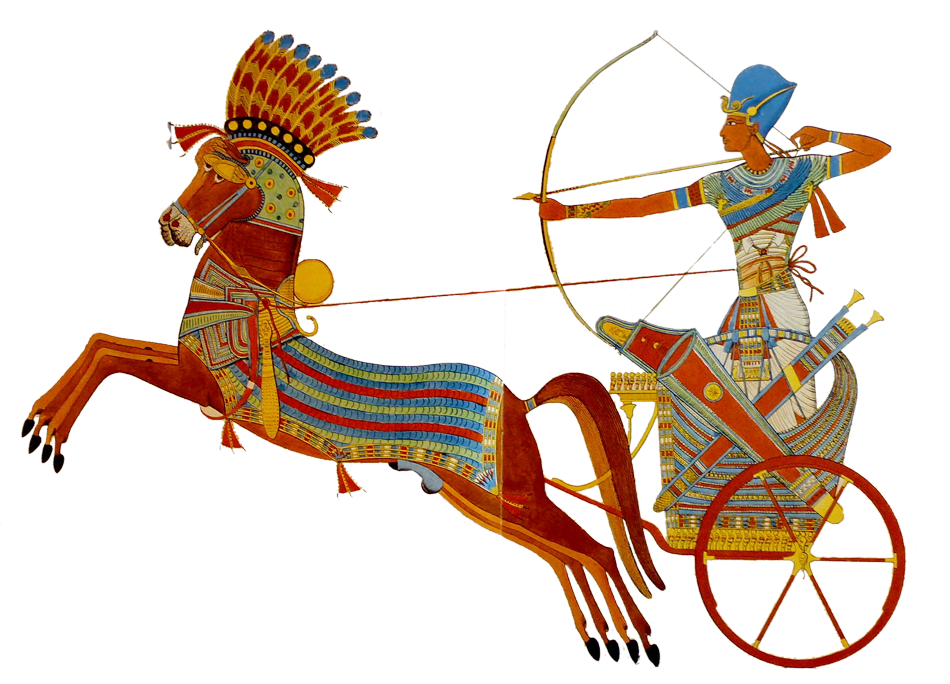
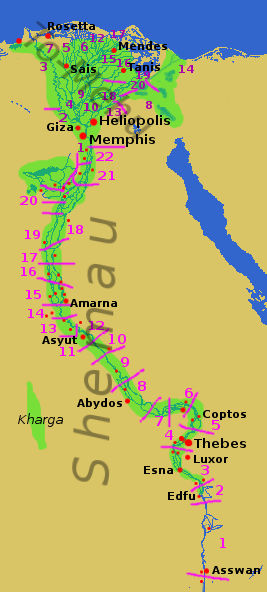
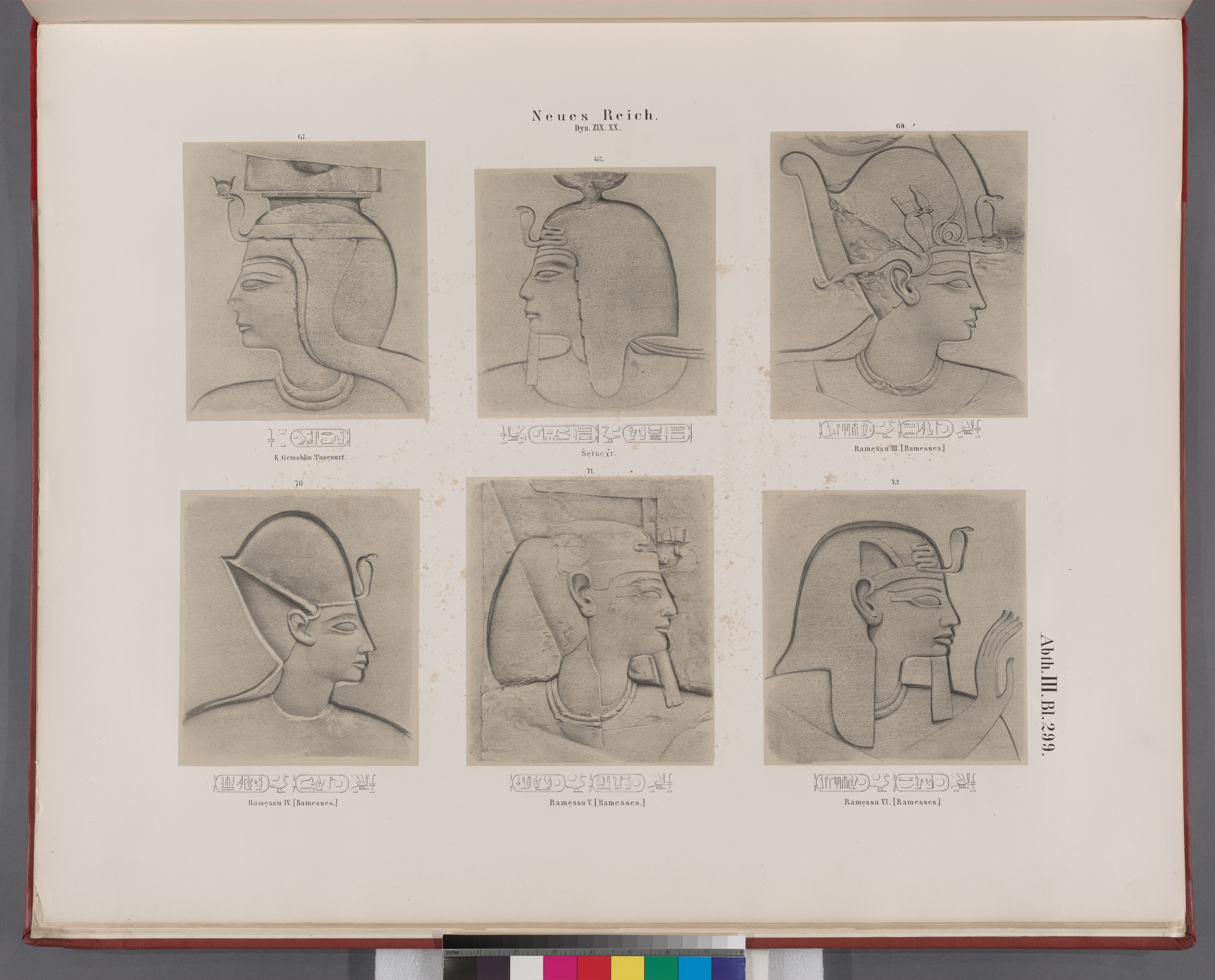
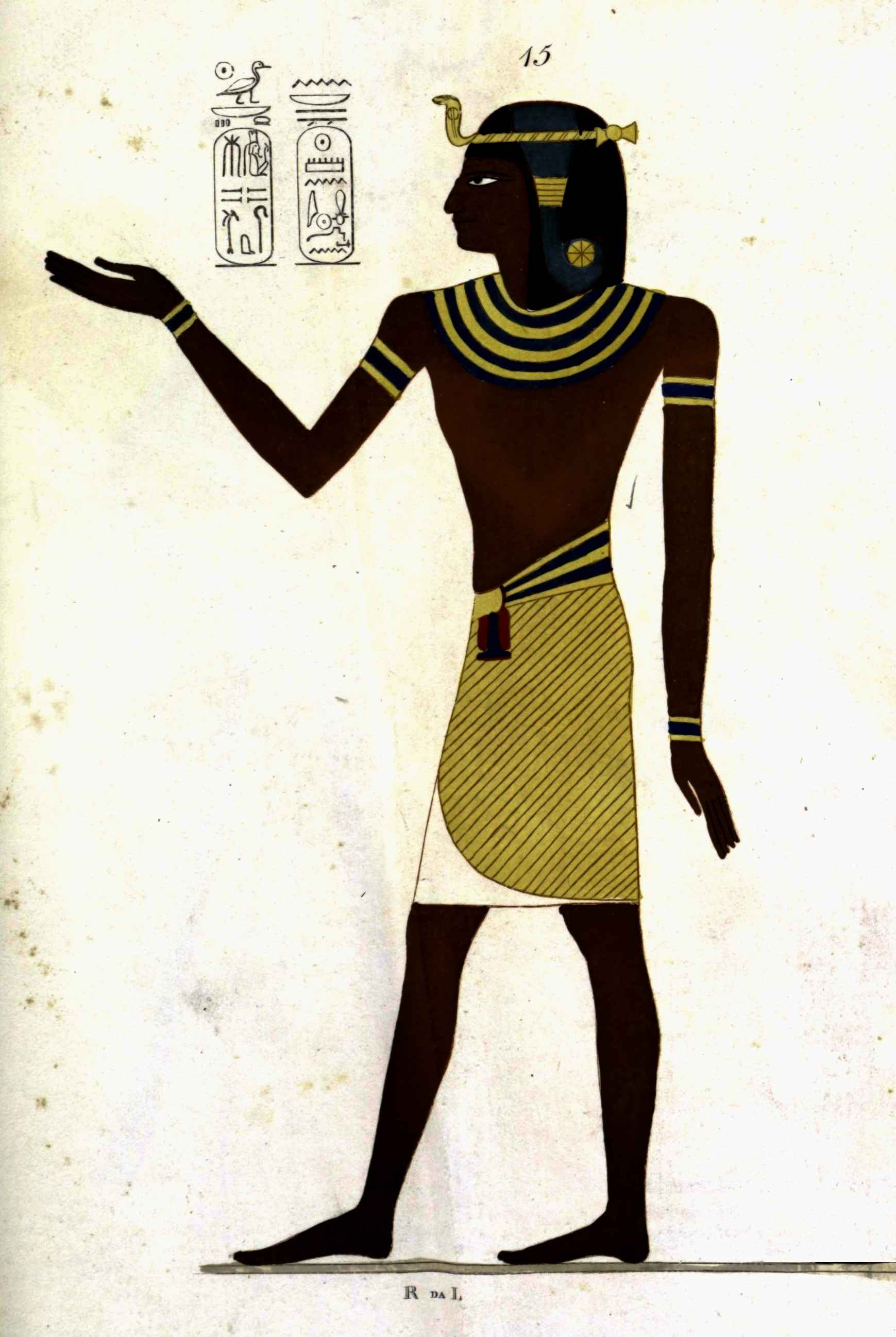
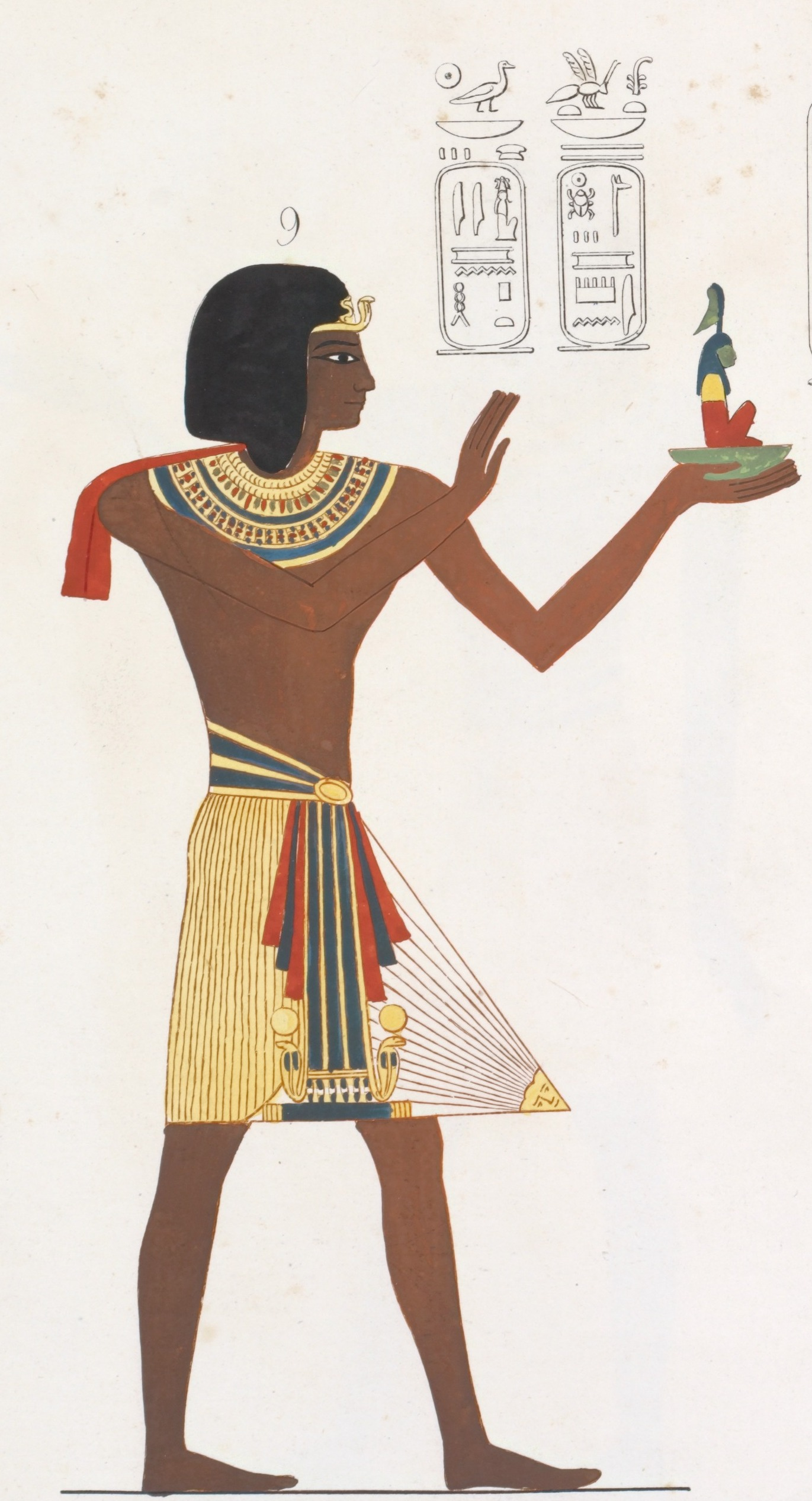
1. Map of New Kingdom Egypt around 1200 bc
2. Ramesses the Great, showcasing an Egyptian chariot of the period
3. "Nomes" or administrative divisions of New Kingdom Egypt, Ramesses the Great named his children to these posts among other posts. Amenmesse as an example is said to have been "Heqa-waset" or Nomarch of Thebes, number four on the map.
4. Upper line of pictures; Tausret, Setnakhte and Ramesses III
5. Amenmesse
6. Seti II

The following people are known to have at least claimed the title of Pharaoh during this period:

- Amenmesse
- Seti II
- Tausret
- Siptah
- Setnakht

=== Contemporary events in the nearby world ===
Late Bronze Age collapse

- Fall of the Hittite Empire – Ruled by Šuppiluliuma II
- Destruction of Ugarit – A Trading city, vassal of the Hittites
- Trojan War – Possibly depending on dating and veracity of the events
- Inter-dynastic conflict in Assyria – Tukulti-Ninurta I was assassinated triggering civil strife
- Warfare in Mycenaean Greece – There are evidence of warfare and destruction
- Israelite highland settlement – rural expansion in the central hills of Canaan.

=== Chronology ===
Scholars primarily use the regnal years of various pharaohs to establish chronology, as scholars disagree about the alignment of these events with our modern system of counting years. The 5th year of a particular pharaoh may correspond to different years in BC, depending on the source. However, there is a relatively high degree of agreement between sources when it comes to placing events in specific years of a monarch's reign. Although there may still be occasional discrepancies in this regard, they are generally less variable than the translations into our contemporary year system.

=== Debate on lineage ===
Determining the descent of pharaohs can be uncertain. This uncertainty extends to other pharaohs mentioned in the list of claimants, except for Seti II, who is known to be descended from Merneptah. The relationship of Tausret, Amenmesse and Setnakhte to the ruling dynasty remains unclear, although it is accepted that they are related. There is often debate about their familial relationships, including questions of parentage, siblingship, etc. These complexities should be taken into account when studying these historical events.

== Phase 1 – Struggle between Seti II and Amenmesse ==
Upon Merneptah's death, both Seti II, Merneptah's eldest son, and Amenmesse claimed the throne. Amenmesse, of unknown parentage but royal lineage, was able to overthrow Seti but not completely remove him from power in Upper Egypt. This lasted until the end of the second year of Seti's reign, around 1201 BC. By the fifth year of Seti's reign, around 1198 BC, Seti seemed to have regained control of all Egypt and he died in the sixth year of his reign, around 1197 BC. Thereafter, there is no historical record of Amenmesse beyond Seti's fifth year, suggesting his probable death, as Seti later portrayed him as "the enemy" in his propaganda and murals.

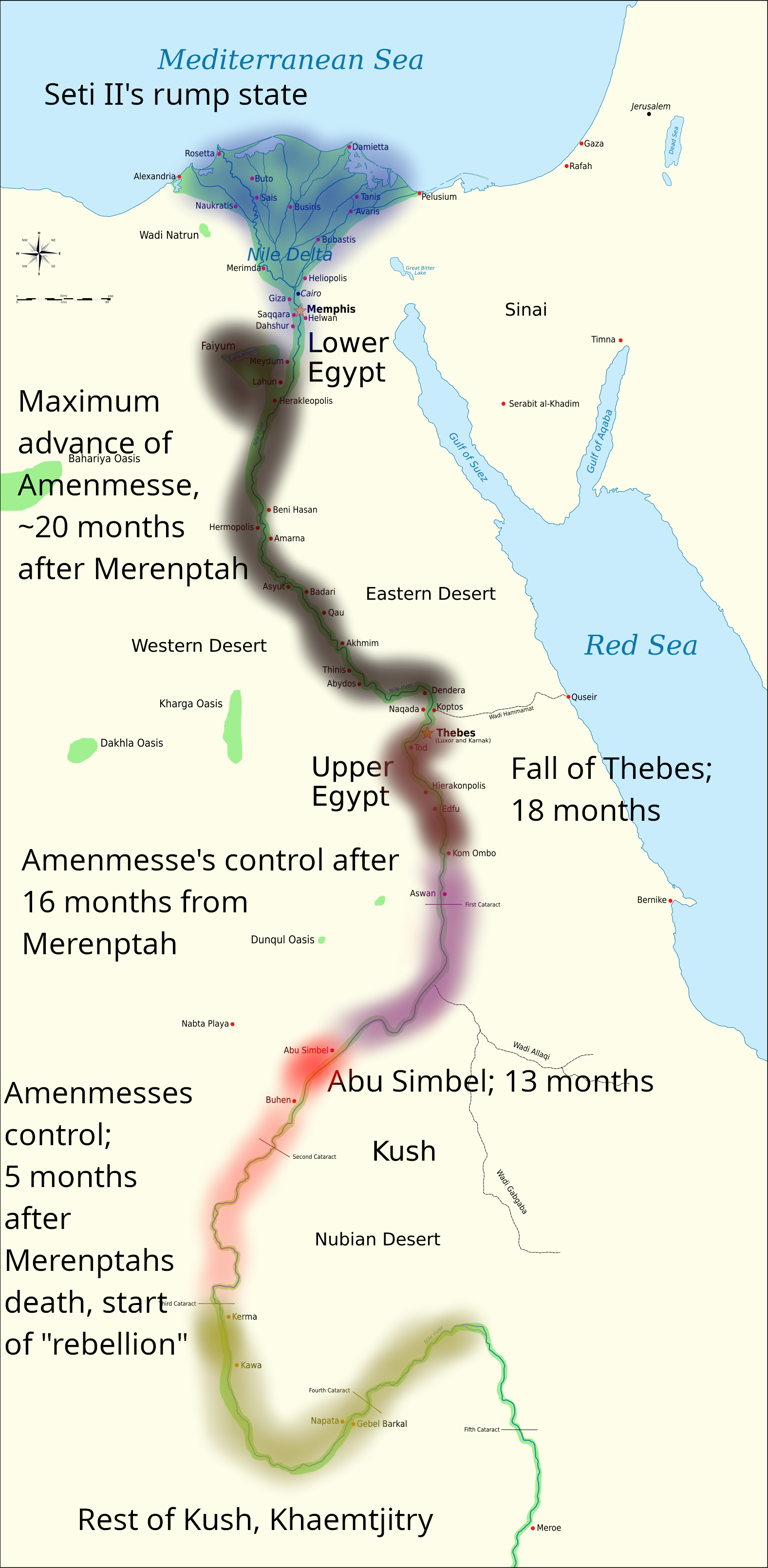
Amenmesse's advances northwards. Months are given in a timespan from after Merneptah had died. These are based on Aidan Dodson's book. These areas of control should also be considered approximate. Light red: Amenmesse 5 months Dark red: Amenmesse, 13 months Liliac: Amenmesse conquests at month 16 Brown: Fall of Thebes at month 18 Black: Amenmesse's max extent towards Fayyum roughly at month 20 Blue: Seti II, at about month 20 Light red and yellow: Kush

Dodson suggests that Messuy may have been Amenmesse. Messuy was the Viceroy of Kush, but during Merneptah's reign the position shifted to Khaemtjitry, who then defected and became Amenmesse's viceroy. This move was significant as it aligned Amenmesse with the military strength of Kush. There has been speculation about a possible high-level purge during the transition to Seti II's rule, which may have been the catalyst for the coming conflict. Seti II's overthrow seems to have been effective in the Thebaid region, as some workers in Deir el-Medina were killed in the transfer of power, according to surviving documents. Seti's name disappears from the records of Deir el-Medina in the last month of his second year of reign.

Amenmesse's control of Egypt began about five months after Merneptah's death, starting near the second cataract but not yet reaching Abu Simbel. Initially, Amenmesse's progress was slow, with Seti II still in charge of Amada early in the second year of his reign. Thebes fell within 18 months of the start of the rebellion. Amenmesse eventually advanced to Fayyum, leaving Seti with a reduced state in the Delta. The progress is evidenced by the monuments and stelae erected in these regions, which gradually ceased under Seti, indicating his waning authority. Chancellor Bay may have played a role in Seti's restoration, although the details remain unclear. Seti II is thought to have been based at Per-Rameses, near Avaris, during his years fighting Amenmesse and after the loss of Fayyum.

Seti effectively ruled as Pharaoh for about three years after the death of Merneptah, from about 1203 to 1200 BC. He then faced a period of about two years, from the years 1199 to 1198 BC, during which he was deposed or pushed out of the centre of power. He regained power eventually and ruled peacefully for one last year in 1197 BC. Whether Seti's death was natural or the result of foul play remains unknown.

Following Seti's death, his widow Tausret assumed leadership, first through Siptah and later in her own right. Initially, Seti was married to Takhat. In the second year of his reign, around 1202 BC, he married his relative Tausret, possibly to strengthen his position through this alliance. It is believed that both Seti and Tausret were in their early twenties at this time. The period of struggle, strife, war or civil war, as described by various authors, lasted about five years. Seti's power base was originally in the north, while Amenmesse held sway in the south of Thebes, and possibly extending into Nubia.

=== Transition of rule ===
Siptah, who succeeded Seti II, was a child and too young to rule alone. Ian Shaw's book suggests that Siptah was the son of Seti II, while Toby Wilkinson's book suggests that he may have been the son of Amenmesse. Wilkinson also speculates that Siptah may have been an attempt to unite those still loyal to the late Amenmesse.

On the other hand, Callender states that Siptah's father remains unknown, but the change of his name from Rameses-Siptah to Merneptah-Siptah suggests a direct link to Merneptah. Meanwhile, Dodson suggests that Siptah was the son of Amenmesse, who in turn was the son of Seti II through a lesser known figure called Takhat.

However, all these historians agree on one point: Siptah's accession was probably due to a lack of more legitimate heirs. This period of uncertainty may have lasted from year 1 (c. 1203 BC) to year 5 (c. 1198 BC) of Seti's reign. An interregnum followed and marked the beginning of the end of the 19th Dynasty.

== Phase 2 – Struggle between Tausret and Sektnakhte ==
Tausret shared her rule with Siptah and an official called Bay. Historical sources cited by Ian Shaw mention Bay's role in placing Tausret on the throne previously held by her father. Bay, of possible Canaanite origin, held the title of Chancellor of Egypt and was also referred to in Ugarit's diplomatic records as "Chief of the Troops of the Great King of the Land". Siptah's parentage was uncertain on his father's side, but his mother, Soteraja, was a Canaanite.

Some speculate that Bay was brought in to support Siptah's rule, as a pharaoh with a foreign mother may not have been as prestigious as one with an Egyptian mother. Artifacts from her time show Bay, Siptah and Tausret in equal stature, suggesting a power-sharing arrangement, although its nature remains unclear.

Tausret later executed Bay, possibly for conspiring against her, around 1192 BC during the fifth year of Siptah's reign. Siptah's untimely death, just as he was about to rule independently, raises suspicions, although there is no concrete evidence of Tausret's involvement.

Tausret's reign was marked by significant building projects, including her tomb in the Valley of the Kings rather than the Valley of the Queens. This choice suggests that she ruled as a pharaoh in her own right. Her architectural style was very similar to that of Ramesses II, suggesting a family connection.

Setnakhte succeeded Tausret, marking the beginning of the 20th Dynasty. A painting shows Twosret fighting an unknown enemy. Setnakhte described the years before his reign and that of Seti II as chaotic. Tausret's tomb was remodeled during the 20th Dynasty, indicating strained relations. Although unconfirmed, most Egyptologists believe that Setnakhte was a descendant, possibly a grandson or great-grandson, of the 19th Dynasty's Ramesses the Great.

=== Inheritance in Ancient Egypt ===
Joyce Tyldesley notes that in ancient Egypt, men and women of similar social status were considered equal under the law. However, men generally had the dominant role within their households, while women had the ability to own, buy, sell and inherit property, differing from practices in later medieval Europe and other regions. Despite these rights, there were still distinct gender roles in society.

When it came to inheriting the throne, while it was not unheard of for women to become pharaohs, it remained a rare occurrence, indicating a de facto preference for male succession. It is noteworthy that one of the contenders for the throne was a female pharaoh who, despite this preference for males, ruled successfully for a considerable number of years.

The throne was not automatically inherited by a pharaoh's grandchildren if the parent of that grandchild had already died before the pharaoh, unlike in medieval Europe where if a king died before his older children, his grandchildren were still eligible for the throne. This meant that Ramesses' children were disinherited from the throne when Ramesses the Great outlived some of his children, such as his son Ramesses B. Dodson thinks that Setnakhte may have been a son or grandson of one of these children of Ramesses the Great who had died before the pharaoh, and so Setnakhte felt himself to be a legitimate candidate for pharaoh.

=== Final fall of the dynasty ===
The events at the end of the 19th Dynasty are not fully documented. It is mentioned that a Canaanite named Irsu may have invaded and seized power. The subsequent records of the 20th Dynasty indicate that there was turmoil in the land and that Setnakhte eventually came to power and expelled the foreign invaders. However, it is unclear whether this transition of power was peaceful or marked by conflict. The details of the conflicts and their timings are uncertain, but it is believed that they occurred sometime after the death of Bay in 1192 BC. Setnakhte is known to have come from southern Egypt and completed his conquests in the second year of his reign, around 1187 BC.

Dodson sees Siptah's death as the catalyst for Setnakhte's rebellion and believes that Setnakhte must have been part of the ruling court prior to this rebellion, who had supported the earlier execution of Bay. Setnakhte's motivation for seizing power may have been related to Tausret's identification with her late husband after the death of Siptah in the sixth year of his reign in 1191 BC. There is some evidence that Tausret used Siptah's restoration cartouches during the early 20th Dynasty. It is also believed that the transition from Tausret's rule to Setnakhte's was direct, without a power vacuum or interregnum during which Irsu might have exercised control. Setnakhte regarded Seti II as the last legitimate pharaoh, and this transition is thought to have been violent, although the exact sequence of events remains unknown. Setnakhte died a few years after his successful seizure of power.

Toby Wilkinson believes that Setnakhte was a garrison commander who attempted a coup against Tausret. Wilkinson says that Setnakhte's son was also in the army and that the coup lasted "a few months". There is evidence that Tausret may have ruled for 2 years longer than previously thought and had a reign of 8 to 9 years. This casts doubt on the idea that she was overthrown in a few months. In the end, we cannot be sure.

As for Tausret, her fate is uncertain. There are few later mentions of her, but she did not suffer the same disgrace as Akhenaten or Amenmesse. The exact cause and date of her death are unknown.

Norbert van Cleve in a 2024 paper disputes the idea of a war between Tausret and Setnakhte, instead interpreting Setnakhte's alleged victory over Irsu the Syrian as the appropriation of Tausret's victory over Bay. Tausret may have ascended the throne earlier than previously thought due to her finds from Siptah's tomb. He also argues her reign may have been more successful than previously thought. Based on monumental building projects undertaken by Tausret, a reign length of 8 years is probably too short. Van Cleve also sees no evidence for a legitimate claim for Setnakhte to grasp power. Comparing Setnakthe's Elephantine Stele with Ramesses III's later claims of having driven out all the foreign enemies, suggests Setnakhte didn't do that, but rather pacified his enemies somehow. Van Cleve also thinks Tausret must've been a fully competent ruler.

== Aftermath ==
By Ramesses III's death Egypt's Great Power status had come to an end and the start of a long collapse begun. His father Setnakhte and later Ramesses III played key roles in leading New Kingdom Egypt during the Bronze Age collapse. They defended against the Sea Peoples and helped Egypt recover. However, Egypt's economy suffered from the loss of trade routes to the Near East. By the time the New Kingdom ended with Ramesses XI, Egypt was very different from the time of Ramesses the Great. It is worth noting that some of Egypt's contemporaries, such as the Hittites and Mycenaean Greece, did not survive the collapse of the Bronze Age, whereas Egypt did.

=== Destruction in Southern Canaan ===
There is evidence of destruction in southern Canaan during or shortly after the reign of Tausret, as in the case of Akko. Whether Canaan played a role in the Egyptian civil wars is unknown, but as the southern Canaanite cities were vassals of Egypt during the 19th Dynasty, they were probably affected by this master-client relationship. There is further destruction from the time of Ramesses III. Eric H. Cline discusses the various causes, such as the Sea Peoples, natural disasters, warfare, famine and so on, without giving a single reason. Egypt would later lose its military garrisons and many of its Canaanite vassals as the Bronze Age collapse continued.
