= Papyrus Salt 124 =

Egyptian papyrus

The Papyrus Salt 124 (also known as the British Museum Papyrus 10055) is an ancient Egyptian papyrus dating to the beginning of the 20th Dynasty. This papyrus is a copy of a letter addressed to the Vizier of the time, most likely Hori II.

It brings various complaints against Paneb, a chief workman at Deir el-Medina, a workmen’s community at Thebes, where the papyrus was most likely found. This papyrus gives insight into both the nature of the judicial system, and some of the corrupt practices that may have taken place in Deir el-Medina and other such workers' communities at the time.

== Origin of the papyrus ==
This papyrus is located in the archives of the British Museum, from one of the collections of early 19th century Egyptologist Henry Salt. Rather than being excavated by Salt, this papyrus was purchased in Egypt, probably in Deir el-Medina near the city of Thebes. A translation did not emerge until 1870, when François Chabas published a translation and short summary. It was not until 1929, when Jaroslav Černý published an English language translation that Egyptologists began to take an interest in both the papyrus and the story of Paneb.

Though the dating of the papyrus is not exact, scholars have attempted to infer the date around which it was written. A later complaint in year 29 of the reign of Ramesses III provides a valuable clue. A descendant of Paneb, bringing his own accusations to the authorities, references a trial of Paneb for one of the crimes he is accused of in the papyrus, under Vizier Hori II. However, Hori II held office from the reign of the Pharaoh Siptah up until the reign of Ramesses III, so scholars have sought to narrow the time down further. Egyptologist Dominique Valbelle proposed that Paneb had not been removed from office until after year 5 of Ramesses III, due to a papyrus dating to that year that listed Paneb's son Aapahte as still working, unlikely in the event that his father was dismissed from his position. However, later dating has proven that papyrus to date to year 5 of the reign of Siptah, when Paneb was unquestionably in power.

== Contents of the papyrus ==
The Papyrus Salt 124 is 38 by 62 centimeters, and is made of three sheets glued together. Černý assumes that since the middle sheet is 27 centimeters wide, the other sheets were originally of comparable width, meaning that the third sheet (23 centimeters wide) might have been slightly cropped, while the first sheet (12 centimeters wide) was definitely damaged at some point, and several lines are incomplete, particularly on the first column of the recto, the front side of the papyrus. The frame of the papyrus is 45.4 by 68.3 centimeters (British Museum). Černý describes the papyrus as "very thin," with "a yellowish brown color" and "relatively pale" ink. The first column of the recto has at least one line missing, while the last line legible, line 21, is incomplete, as are the bottom lines of every column except the second column of the verso, which is left blank at the bottom of the page. Nevertheless, the British Museum rates the condition of the papyrus as "fair" (British Museum).

The handwriting of the document, which is in hieratic, is of high quality, as is the spelling. However, the grammar is very poor. Černý attempts to explain this discrepancy by guessing that the writing was the work of a scribe in the area, with the author, Amennakht, dictating the contents of the letter. This would make sense, given the low literacy rates at the time.

The papyrus takes the form of a letter to the vizier, with the express intent of proving that the conduct of Paneb is unfit for the office of foreman. It takes the form of a list of accusations against Paneb. However, many of these offenses were clearly not punishable offenses, but merely unethical actions taken by Paneb added to add weight to the overall message. As such, the charges are extremely broad, from ordering his men to do work for his personal benefit to murder.

However, despite the fact that the papyrus is in the form of a letter to the vizier, it was probably just a personal copy. According to Černý, a letter to the vizier would have begun with a long address enumerating the numerous titles of the vizier. In addition, such a letter would be in the archives of the Vizier, and would not have made their way into the hands of Henry Salt.

== Accusations against Paneb ==
The author of the papyrus, Amennakht, describes himself as a workman and the son of the former chief workman Nebnefer. His brother, Neferhotep, took over as chief workman at the death of his father, and was killed by an “enemy”. This enemy is interpreted as either foreign enemies or a domestic army during Amenmesse’s usurpation of Thebes. Though Amennakht felt entitled to become the chief workman, the vizier, Preemhab, gave the role to Paneb. Though he believes that the role is not Paneb’s to begin with, he proceeds to list accusations of varying severity so as to better justify his contention that Paneb should be removed from the role of chief workman.

=== Bribery ===
The first accusation lobbied against Paneb is the charge that he gave Preemhab five of Neferhotep's servants, with the implication that this gift is what secured the position for Paneb, not any legitimate claim to be chief workman. He is also accused of giving something to a scribe by the name of Kenherkhepeshef, "something," or nkt, being an Egyptian term for a payment or bribe. This bribe was given to the scribe as payment for getting Paneb out of trouble.

=== Adultery and sexual assault ===
Paneb was accused of many charges of sexual assault and adultery, though there are many ambiguities in the text which make the exact nature of the charges unclear. The charges are special in that they are alleged by his son Aapehty to the door-keepers, who are the people who stand at the door of the tomb at work-sites, but also serve various other functions, including possible legal functions. Though Černý seems to think that the door-keepers might have served the role of bailiffs, A.G. McDowell, a prominent Egyptologist in the study of Deir el-Medina, speculates that the door-keepers' legal function was small, and that Aapehty only testified to them because they stood in a public part of the worksite.

He swore under oath the alleged cases of debauchery, including an instance in which Aapehty himself took part. All the cases of debauchery were with married women, aside from one daughter, who was also the woman Aapehty debauched. The word Černý translates as "debauched" does not necessarily imply mutual consent, so it is ambiguous whether or not Paneb and Aapehty's actions could be classified as rape. However, it is made clear that Paneb violated a woman by force at least once (though this is Amennakht’s assertion, not Aapehty's), when he took a woman named Yemenwaw's clothing, "threw her on top of [a] wall and violated her".

=== Theft and misuse of labour ===
While Paneb was accused of an excess of crimes by Amennakht, the various charges of embezzlement and misuse of labour are particularly emphasized, and appear to cause the most trouble that Paneb runs into. The first of Amennakht’s charges outside of those directly relating to Amennakht's political interests deal with Paneb’s theft of the tomb of Seti II, including the covering of Seti's chariot, storehouses from the tomb, and five doors, though 4 were found later. He stole incense, special oil and wine, and a special statue inscribed with the king's name, and though Amenakht attests to reporting these actions, Paneb took an oath saying "I did not upset a stone in the neighbourhood of the Place of Pharaoh".

In addition to straightforward theft, Paneb also resorted to misappropriating labour and other resources for his own ends. According to Amennakht, Paneb ordered his stone workers not only to steal stone from the worksite of Seti II, but to use this stone to build columns for his personal tomb. In one case, he not only ordered his workers to make a plaited bed, but made their wives weave clothing for him. In addition, he stole several work tools, breaking one (Recto 2.13). Some tools were apparently of great value, as the workers searched for an entire month for a tool he stole before he snuck it back onto the worksite.

In addition to the theft from his worksite, he also stole from other tombs. He stole from the tomb of a workman by the name of Nakhtmin and stole his bed, possibly a stele, and other unnamed objects. He also stole a (mummified or model) goose from the funeral of the daughter of Ramesses II and later swore that he had not. In fact, he had a propensity towards exploring tombs in general, as Amennakht accuses him of entering three tombs, presumably to steal goods, but it seems to have had an element of rebelliousness to it, as he also sat on the sarcophagus of Seti II, a great sign of disrespect to both Seti II and the institution of kingship in Egypt.

=== Violence ===
As part of Amennakht’s character defamation of Paneb, he wrote charges that would make Paneb seem "like a mad man," as Amennakht most definitely saw him. As part of this, there are many charges which portray Paneb as an angry, emotionally unstable chief workman, which he may well have been. Amennahkt even pits the former chief workman Neferhotep against Paneb, stating that Paneb chased after Neferhotep, smashed open doors when Neferhotep hid in a room, and threatened to kill him. Though he did not kill Neferhotep, he instead beat nine men over the course of one night. This apparently led to Neferhotep complaining to the Vizier at the time, Amenmose, who attempted to punish Paneb, only to be fired when Paneb complained directly to the Pharaoh at the time, Amenmesse.

Though his confrontation with Neferhotep is perhaps most strongly related to Amennakht’s ambitions, there are other instances of violent outbursts. In one instance he told the other chief workman (there are two chief workmen at any one time) that he was going to attack and kill him, though the absence of any further explanation in the papyrus indicates that nothing came of the threat. He is further accused of beating up workmen at a night-party, going up on top of a wall, and throwing bricks at people.

=== Other ===
In addition to threatening to kill Neferhotep, Paneb later makes Amenakht swear to not visit the temple of his mother and father, and sent a town crier to declare that "no one should look at the family of the chief workman Nebnefer, when he goes to bring offerings to Amun, their god". This might be seen as a means of destabilizing Amenakht as a political threat, by cutting off the connection to his ancestors.

== Reliability of Amennakht ==
The Papyrus Salt 124 is clearly written with the intention of proving that Paneb’s conduct "is indeed unworthy of this office" of chief workman, and that, as Neferhotep's brother, Amennakht is the rightful successor. Amenakht has every incentive to paint Paneb in a bad light. However, there is correlating evidence for some of his claims, including records under king Siptah detailing the interruptions in work due to personal jobs that Paneb made his workers accomplish, including weaving a bed of straps and fattening his ox, as stated in Recto 2.19-20.

However, that does not necessarily prove Amennakht's case, as M.L. Bierbrier points out in his essay "Paneb Rehabilitated?", which points out that, though succession to the role of chief workman is usually within the family, Neferhotep had in a way adopted Paneb, and the fact that he had inherited Neferhotep's property with which to bribe the vizier serves as further evidence that he was seen as a sort of son to Neferhotep, who was childless.

== Consequences of the letter ==
Though there is no evidence of the reception of this letter by the vizier, we do know from a later trial with a descendant of Paneb that Paneb was eventually put on trial for the theft of stones from the tomb worksite under Vizier Hori II. We also know that in year 11 of Ramesses III a successor named Nekhemmut is named as successor to Paneb, a worker unrelated to Neferhotep or Amennakht.

== See also ==
- Ancient Egyptian literature

== Bibliography ==
- Černý, Jaroslav. Papyrus Salt 124 (Brit. Mus. 10055) . Journal of Egyptian Archaeology 15 (1929), pp. 243–258
- Vernus, Pascal. Affairs and scandals in Ancient Egypt. Translated by David Lorton. Ithaca: Cornell University Press, 2003.
- McDowell, A.G. Village Life in Ancient Egypt. New York: Oxford University Press, 1999.
- Bierbrier, M.L. “Paneb Rehabilitated?” In Deir el-Medina in the Third Millennium AD, edited by R.J. Demaree and A. Egberts, 51-54. Leiden: Nederlands Instituut voor het Nabije Oosten, 2000.
- Bierbrier, M.L. The Tomb-Builders of the Pharaohs. Cairo: The American University in Cairo Press, 1982.
- McDowell, A.G. Jurisdiction in the Workmen’s Community of Deir el-Medina. Leiden: Nederlands Instituut voor het Nabije Oosten, 1990.
- British Museum Collection Database. “10055” www.britishmuseum.org/collection, British Museum. Online. Accessed 10/23/2010.
