= Anuketemheb =

- King's Daughter; Mistress of the Palace
Egyptian name
a n q t Z5 Aa15 Hb
- Dynasty: 19th or 20th Dynasty

Anuketemheb (Ancient Egyptian: ˁnq.t-m-ḥb "Anuket in Feast") was an ancient Egyptian princess of the 19th or the 20th Dynasty. She is known from only one artifact, a red granite sarcophagus lid which was originally hers but was later reused for Takhat, the mother of Amenmesse and was discovered in the tomb KV10.

Anuketemheb's titles were "King's Daughter" and "Mistress of the Palace". After her sarcophagus was usurped, its inscriptions were altered to titles suitable for Takhat, namely "King's Wife" and "Great Royal Wife"; the names in the cartouches were also changed. However, the title "King's Daughter" was retained in some places. Her father could not be identified, but she is possibly identical with a princess depicted in a forecourt of the Temple of Luxor, in a procession of daughters of Ramesses II; her name is only partially readable but ends in em-heb.
