= Paneb =

Chief workman at Deir el-Medina

Paneb was a chief workman at Deir el-Medina, a workmen's community at Thebes.

The author of the Papyrus Salt 124, Amennakht, describes himself as a workman and the son of the former chief-workman Nebnefer. His brother, Neferhotep, took over as chief-workman at the death of his father, and was killed by an "enemy". This enemy is interpreted as either foreign enemies or a domestic army during Amenmesse's usurpation of Thebes.

Though Amennakht felt entitled to become the chief-workman, the vizier, Paraemheb, gave the role to Paneb. Though he believes that the role is not Paneb's to begin with, he proceeds to list accusations of varying severity so as to better justify his contention that Paneb should be removed from the role of chief-workman.

== Bribery ==
The first accusation lobbied against Paneb is the charge that he gave Preemhab five of Neferhotep's servants, with the implication that this gift is what secured the position for Paneb, not any legitimate claim to be chief workman. He is also accused of giving something to a scribe by the name of Kenherkhepeshef, "something," or nkt, being an Egyptian term for a payment or bribe. This bribe was given to the scribe as payment for getting Paneb out of trouble.

== Adultery and sexual assault ==
Paneb was accused of many charges of sexual assault and adultery, though there are many ambiguities in the text which make the exact nature of the charges unclear. The charges are special in that they are alleged by his son Aapehty to the door-keepers, who are the people who stand at the door of the tomb at work-sites, but also serve various other functions, including possible legal functions. Though Černý seems to think that the door-keepers might have served the role of bailiffs, A.G. McDowell, a prominent Egyptologist in the study of Deir el-Medina, speculates that the door-keepers' legal function was small, and that Aapehty only testified to them because they stood in a public part of the worksite.

He swore under oath the alleged cases of debauchery, including an instance in which Aapehty himself took part. All the cases of debauchery were with married women, aside from one daughter, who was also the woman Aapehty debauched. The word that Černý translates as "debauched" does not necessarily imply mutual consent, so it is ambiguous whether or not Paneb and Aapehty's actions could be classified as rape. However, it is made clear that Paneb violated a woman by force at least once (though this is Amennakht's assertion, not Aapehty's), when he took a woman named Yemenwaw's clothing, "threw her on top of [a] wall and violated her".

== Theft and misuse of labour ==
While Paneb was accused of an excess of crimes by Amennakht, the various charges of embezzlement and misuse of labour are particularly emphasized, and appear to cause the most trouble that Paneb runs into. The first of Amennakht's charges outside of those directly relating to Amennakht's political interests deal with Paneb's theft of the tomb of Seti II, including the covering of Seti's chariot, storehouses from the tomb, and five doors, though four were found later. He stole incense, special oil and wine, and a special statue inscribed with the king's name, and though Amenakht attests to reporting these actions, Paneb took an oath saying "I did not upset a stone in the neighbourhood of the Place of Pharaoh".

In addition to straightforward theft, Paneb also resorted to misappropriating labour and other resources for his own ends. According to Amennakht, Paneb ordered his stone workers not only to steal stone from the worksite of Seti II, but to use this stone to build columns for his personal tomb. In one case, he not only ordered his workers to make a plaited bed, but made their wives weave clothing for him. In addition, he stole several work tools, breaking one (Recto 2.13). Some tools were apparently of great value, as the workers searched for an entire month for a tool he stole before he snuck it back onto the worksite.

In addition to the theft from his worksite, he also stole from other tombs. He stole from the tomb of a workman by the name of Nakhtmin and stole his bed, possibly a stele, and other unnamed objects. He also stole a (mummified or model) goose from the funeral of the daughter of Ramesses II and later swore that he had not. In fact, he had a propensity towards exploring tombs in general, as Amennakht accuses him of entering three tombs, presumably to steal goods, but it seems to have had an element of rebelliousness to it, as he also sat on the sarcophagus of Seti II, a great sign of disrespect to both Seti II and the institution of kingship in Egypt.

== Violence ==
As part of Amennakht's character defamation of Paneb, he wrote charges that would make Paneb seem "like a mad man," as Amennakht most definitely saw him. As part of this, there are many charges which portray Paneb as an angry, emotionally unstable chief-workman, which he may well have been. Amennahkt even pits the former chief-workman Neferhotep against Paneb, stating that Paneb chased after Neferhotep, smashed open doors when Neferhotep hid in a room, and threatened to kill him. Though he did not kill Neferhotep, he instead beat nine men over the course of one night. This apparently led to Neferhotep complaining to the Vizier at the time, Amenmose, who attempted to punish Paneb, only to be fired when Paneb complained directly to the Pharaoh at the time, Amenmesse.

Though his confrontation with Neferhotep is perhaps most strongly related to Amennakht's ambitions, there are other instances of violent outbursts. In one instance he told the other chief workman (there are two chief workmen at any one time) that he was going to attack and kill him, though the absence of any further explanation in the papyrus indicates that nothing came of the threat. He is further accused of beating up workmen at a night-party, going up on top of a wall, and throwing bricks at people.

== Other ==
In addition to threatening to kill Neferhotep, Paneb later makes Amenakht swear to not visit the temple of his mother and father, and sent a town crier to declare that "no one should look at the family of the chief workman Nebnufer, when he goes to bring offerings to Amun, their god". This might be seen as a means of destabilizing Amenakht as a political threat, by cutting off the connection to his ancestors.

== In popular culture ==
Paneb is a central character in The Stone of Light serial book by Christian Jacq, about the workmen in Deir el-Medina at the time of the XIX and XX dynasties.

== Bibliography ==
- Černý, Jaroslav (1929). "Papyrus Salt 124 (Brit. Mus. 10055)". Journal of Egyptian Archaeology. 15 (15): 243–258. doi:10.1177/030751332901500139. S2CID 193996732.
- McDowell, A. G. (2001). Village Life in Ancient Egypt. New York: Oxford University Press. p. 279. ISBN 9780199247530.
- Vernus, Pascal (2003). Lorton, David (ed.). Affairs and scandals in Ancient Egypt. Ithaca: Cornell University Press. p. 211. ISBN 9780801440786.
