= Khaemtir =

Ancient Egyptian vizier

- Viceroy of Kush and Vizier of the South
- Predecessor: Mernudjem (as Viceroy of Kush)
- Successor: Messuy (as Viceroy of Kush)
- Dynasty: 19th Dynasty
- Pharaoh: Merneptah (as Viceroy of Kush); Amenmesse (as Vizier)

Khaemtir (also written as Khaemtjitry) was a Viceroy of Kush and Vizier of Ancient Egypt. He served during the reign of Amenmesse and Seti II.

== Viceroy of Kush under Merneptah ==
Monuments attesting to Khaemtir's service as Viceroy mostly stem from Buhen, a Nubian fortress located at the Second Cataract. The monuments of viceroy Khaemtjitry all seem to show damage to his name.

== Vizier under Amenmesse ==
Vizier Khaemtjitry is shown on a block from a shrine in Deir el-Medina. The name of Khaemtjitry has been plastered over and replaced by that of the Vizier Parahotep. The scene is now in the Oriental Institute in Chicago (OI 10816)

== Identification of the Vizier and the Viceroy ==
The identification of the Vizier and the Viceroy as being the same man is not certain, but likely. There are different scenarios regarding the order in which the men held office. Dodson outlines a series of events where Viceroy Messuy steps down (or is forced out) and is replaced by Khaemtjitry at the very end of Merenptahs' reign. Once Messuy takes power as Amenmesse, he elevated Khaemtjitry to the position of Vizier.

Krauss for instance points out there is no evidence to support the theory that the Viceroy Khaemtir, whom he dates to the reign of Merenptah, and the Vizier Khaemtir from the reign of Amenmesse are one and the same person.
