= Paraemheb =

Ancient Egyptian vizier

- Vizier of the South
- Dynasty: 19th Dynasty
- Pharaoh: Amenmesse

Paraemheb (Pre'em'hab) was a vizier of ancient Egypt. He served during the reigns of Amenmesse and Sethi II, circa 1200 BC.
