= Amenmose (vizier) =

Ancient Egyptian vizier

- Vizier of the South
- Dynasty: 19th Dynasty
- Pharaoh: Amenmesse

Amenmose was an ancient Egyptian vizier, who served during the reign of Amenmesse and Seti II.
