= Takhat =

- King's Wife; King's Mother; Queen consort of Egypt
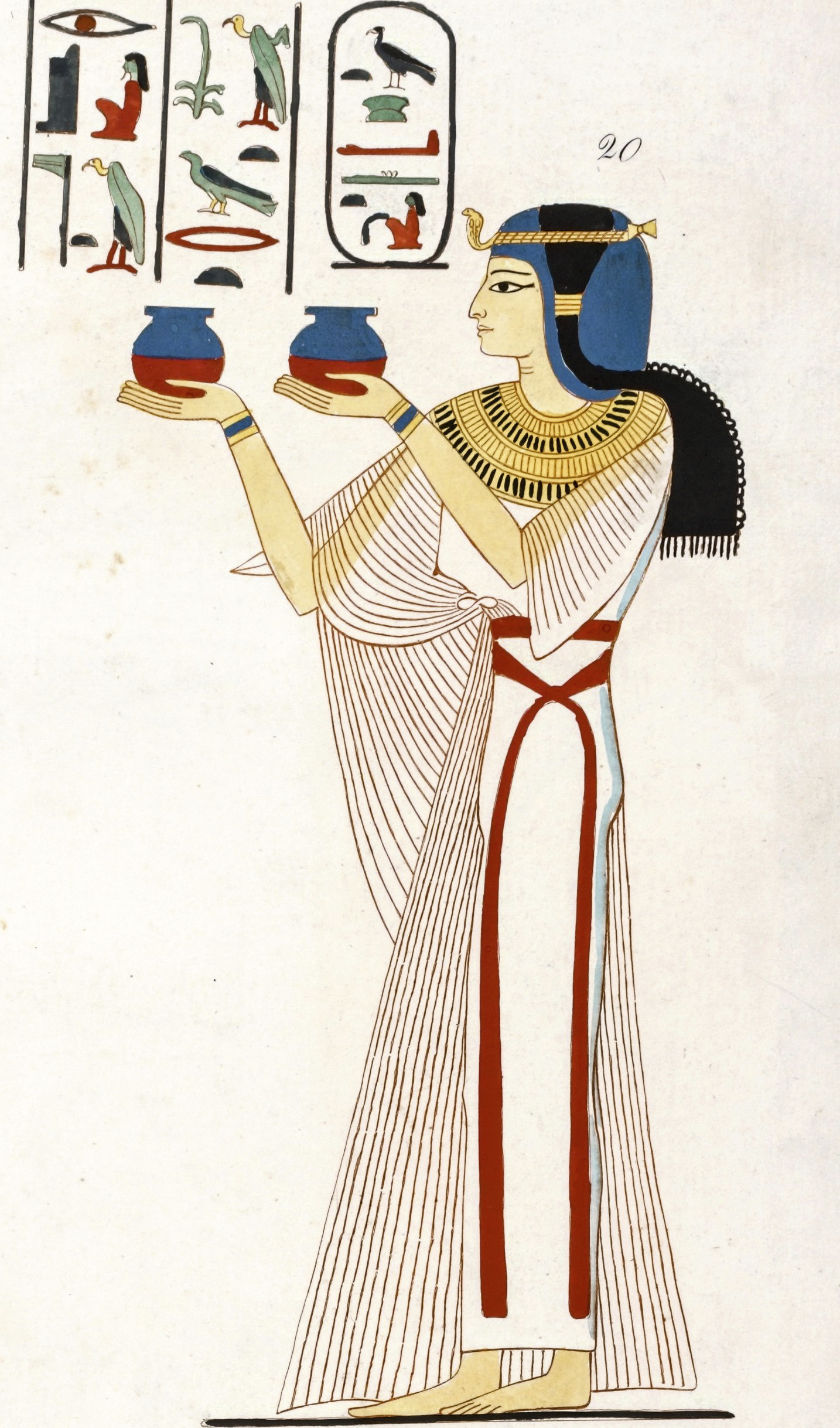
- Drawing of a painting depicting Takhat offering two vases
- Burial: KV10, Valley of the Kings (possibly)
- Spouse: Merneptah (?); Seti II (?)
- Issue: Amenmesse
- Dynasty: 19th Dynasty
- Father: Ramesses II (uncertain)

t&A N28 t B7
Takhat
in hieroglyphs
Era: New Kingdom
(1550–1069 BC)

Takhat was an ancient Egyptian princess and queen of the 19th Dynasty, the mother of the usurper pharaoh Amenmesse.

There are not many facts known about her other than that she was Amenmesse's mother. She bore the titles King's Daughter and King's Wife. She might have been identical with Takhat, a daughter of Ramesses II, who is mentioned on a Louvre ostracon. Thus she was the aunt of Seti II, but since she was among the youngest children of Ramesses, it is very likely that she was the same age or even younger than Seti II who was the grandson of Ramesses. It is also possible that she was a grandchild of Ramesses; there are several examples of granddaughters bearing the title King's Daughter, although it was not very common. The king she married was either Merenptah or Seti II.

She is shown on several statues of Amenmesse, among them on two statues in the Karnak temple. On one of these, which still stands in Karnak, she is called King's Daughter, King's Wife (Takhat) and the word "wife" replaced the original "mother". According to Aidan Dodson and Dyan Hilton, the title was recarved when Seti, the rightful heir regained the throne and usurped the statue, and that it proves either that Takhat married Seti when he became pharaoh, or that they had been married before, which means Amenmesse was Seti's son and usurped the throne from his own father. This theory might be strengthened by the other statue (now in Cairo), on which Takhat is also named as King's Daughter and King's Wife, but without any trace of recarving, while the king's name replaced another name. This statue was, according to Dodson and Hilton, possibly made by Seti; later it was usurped by Amenmesse who replaced Seti's name with his own, while leaving his mother's titles intact; still later Amenmesse's name was again replaced with that of Seti. According to another theory Seti was never married to Takhat and had her original titles recarved only to remove all traces that her son ever ruled.

She is likely to have been buried in Amenmesse's tomb KV10 in the Valley of the Kings. Her sarcophagus lid originally belonged to an otherwise unknown Princess-Queen Anuketemheb, who might be identical with a daughter of Ramesses II, a princess once named in the Luxor temple but from whose name only ...heb remains. The tomb was later usurped by two family members of Ramesses IX: his mother Takhat and his Great Royal Wife Baketwerel. The latter was once thought to be Amenmesse's Great Royal Wife, but it has been proven since then that decoration mentioned her replaced that of Amenmesse in the tomb, so she must have lived later.
