= Seti-Merenptah =

Ancient Egyptian prince

p t V28 U6 C7 i i n
Seti-Merenptah
in hieroglyphs
Era: New Kingdom
(1550–1069 BC)

Seti-Merenptah was an ancient Egyptian prince of the late 19th Dynasty, a son of Pharaoh Seti II.

He is depicted behind his father in Seti's small Karnak temple. His figure replaces another, probably that of Chancellor Bay. It is assumed that he was born in the last year of his father's reign and died in Siptah's fourth year, but this is not proven.
