= Messuy =

Ancient Egyptian scribe

- Viceroy of Kush
- Predecessor: Khaemtir
- Successor: Seti
- Dynasty: 19th Dynasty
- Pharaoh: Merneptah and perhaps Seti II and Amenmesse
- Burial: Tomb at Aniba

Messuy (Messuwy) was Viceroy of Kush, Governor of the South Lands, Scribe of the Tables of the Two Lands during the reign of Merneptah (reigned 1213-1203 BCE) and perhaps Seti II and Amenmesse.

== Viceroy of Kush ==
Messuy was appointed Viceroy of Kush in year 5 of Merneptah and followed Khaemtir in office. Messuy added many inscription to temples and sites in Nubia, including Amada, Aksha, Amara, Temple of Beit el-Wali, Wadi es-Sebua, and Bigeh Island.

Messuy may have also been the commander of the army that defeated the Nubian rebellion during Merenptah’s reign as mentioned in the Nubian stelae of the king. This could explain why he held the military title “Overseer of the Army of the Viceroy”.

== Identification of Messuy with Pharaoh Amenmesse ==
Rolf Krauss was the first to suggest that Messuy was to be identified with Amenmesse. Kraus conjectured that Messuy had taken power in Southern Egypt after a short reign of Seti-Merneptah, the son and heir of Merneptah. One argument in favor of Viceroy Messuy taking on a royal role is an addition of a Uraeus to the brow of Messuy's depictions in the Temple of Amada. Dodson for instance is a proponent of this theory, but it has not been generally accepted. Others such as Yurco suggest there is no uraeus, but merely weathering of the stone that gives a false impression of one.

== Death and Burial ==
Messuy may have been buried at Aniba. This tomb was excavated and published by Georg Steindorff.
