= Amenmesse =

Egyptian pharaoh

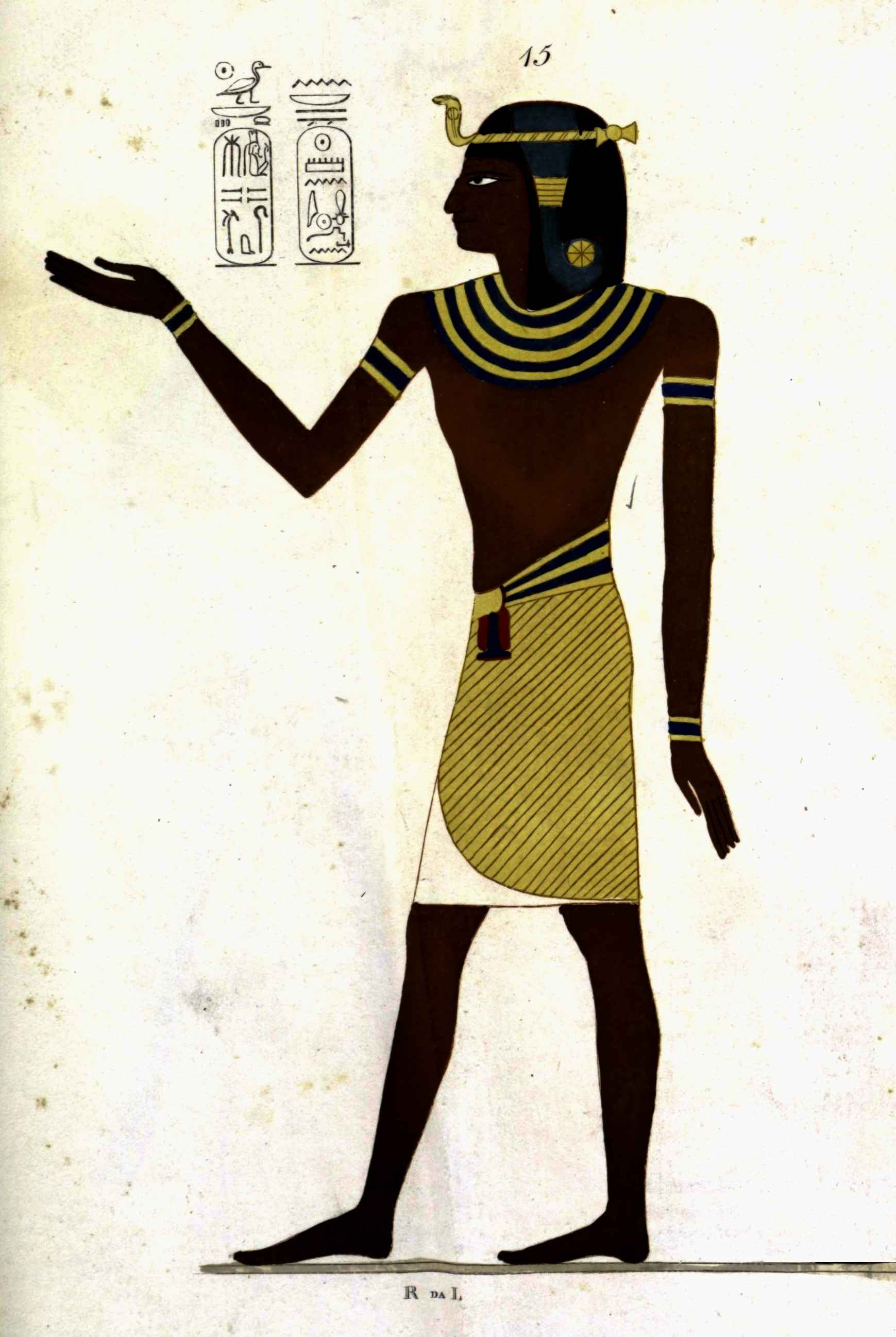
- 1832 drawing of Amenmesse by Ippolito Rosellini

Pharaoh
- Reign: 1201–1198 BC
- Predecessor: Merneptah
- Successor: Seti II
Royal titulary
Horus name
Kanakht Merymaat Shementawy
K3-nḫt-mr.j-M3ˁ-šmn-t3wj
Strong bull, beloved of Maat, he who strengthen the two lands
G5	E1 D40 C10 U6 U32 N35 N17 N17 N21 N21
Nebty name
Werbiaytemipetsut
Wr-bj3wt-m-Jpt-swt
He who is great of miracles in Ipetsut
G16	G36 D21 D58 M17 G1 M17 X1 M17 U16 Aa13 M17 Q3 X1 Q1 Z2 O49
Golden Horus
Aa...-[Ipet-sut ?]
ˁ3...
Great of ... [Ipetsut ?]
G8	O29 hatching O49
Prenomen
Menmire Setepenre
Mn-mj-Rˁ-stp.n-Rˁ
Eternal like Ra, the chosen one of Ra
M23 t L2 t < ra Y5 W19 i ra U21 n >
Nomen
Amenmesse Heqawaset
Jmn-msj-sw-ḥq3-W3st
Fashioned by Amun, ruler of Waset

G39 N5	C12 ms s s S38 N29 S40
- Children: Siptah (possibly)
- Father: Merneptah, Ramesses II or Seti II
- Mother: Takhat
- Died: 1198 BC
- Burial: KV10
- Dynasty: 19th Dynasty

Amenmesse (also Amenmesses or Amenmeses) was the fifth pharaoh of the Nineteenth Dynasty in Ancient Egypt, possibly the son of Merneptah and Queen Takhat. Others consider him to be one of the innumerable sons of Ramesses II. Very little is known about this pharaoh, who ruled Egypt for only three to four years. Various Egyptologists date his reign between 1202 BC–1199 BC or 1203 BC–1200 BC with others giving an accession date of 1200 BC. Amenmesse means "born of or fashioned by Amun" in Egyptian. Additionally, his nomen can be found with the epithet Heqa-waset, which means "Ruler of Thebes". His royal name was Menmire Setepenre.

== Usurper ==
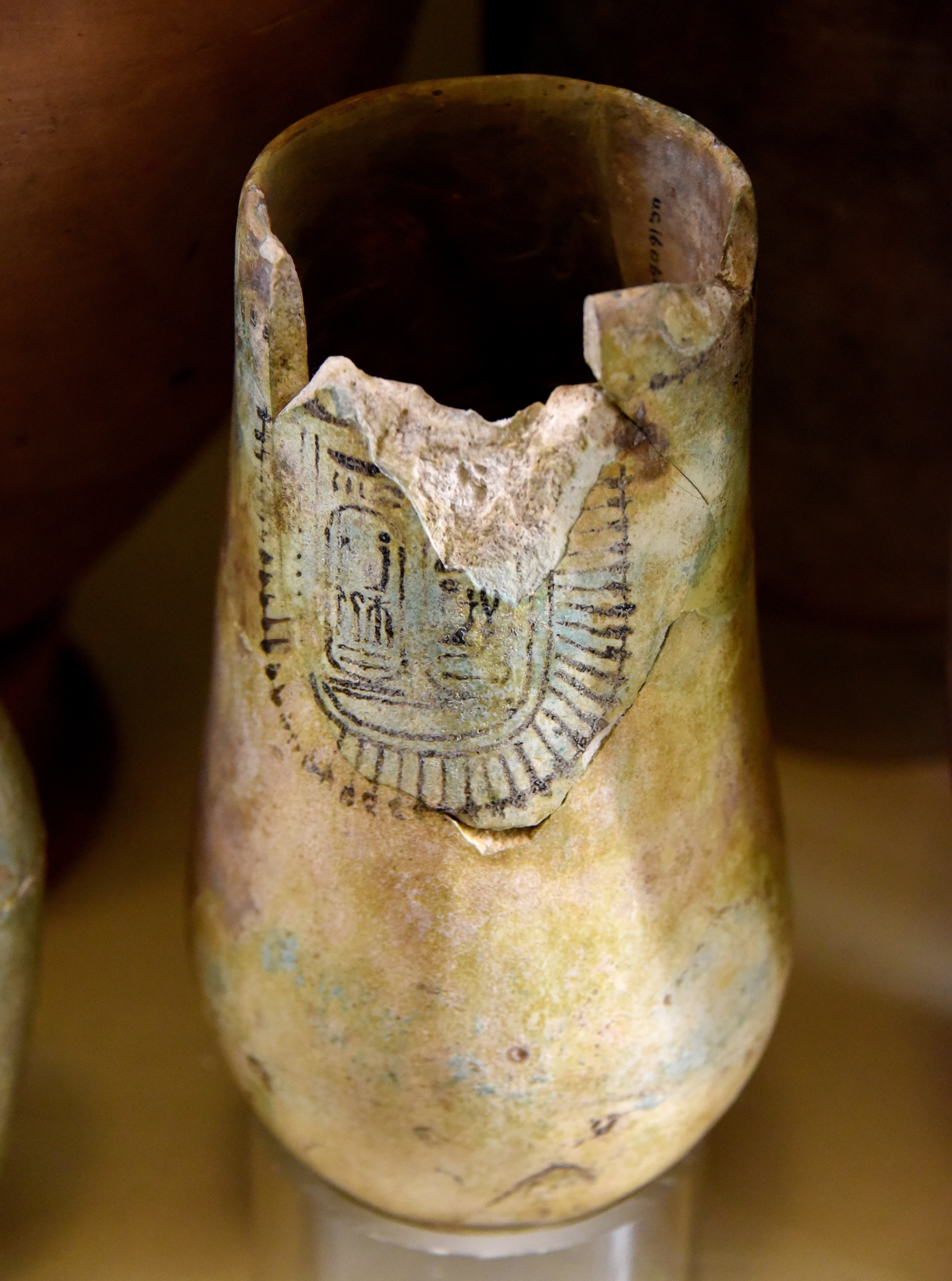
Jar inscribed with the names of Amenmesse, Petrie Museum

It is likely that he was not Merneptah's intended heir. Scholars Kenneth Kitchen and Jürgen von Beckerath have theorized that Amenmesse usurped the throne from Seti-Merneptah, who was Merneptah's son and crown prince and who should have been next in the line of royal succession. It is unclear how this would have happened. Kitchen has written that Amenmesse may have taken advantage of a momentary weakness of Seti-Merneptah or seized power while the crown prince was away in Asia. Seti-Merneptah was most likely the same man as king Seti II, whose reign was traditionally thought to have followed upon Amenmesse's reign. The cartouches of Seti II's tomb in Upper Egypt were deliberately erased and then repainted, suggesting that Seti's rule in Upper Egypt was temporarily interrupted by agents of his half-brother. Confusion generally clouds Amenmesse's reign and its correct position within the succession sequence of the rulers of the Egyptian 19th Dynasty. However, an increasing number of Egyptologists today such as Rolf Krauss and Aidan Dodson maintain that Seti II was in fact the immediate successor of Merneptah "without any intervening rule by Amenmesse." Under this scenario, Amenmesse did not succeed Merneptah on the throne of Egypt and was rather a rival king who usurped power sometime during Years 2 to 4 of Seti II's reign in Upper Egypt and Nubia where his authority is monumentally attested. Amenmesse was documented in power at Thebes during his third and fourth year (and perhaps earlier in Nubia) where Seti II's Year 3 and Year 4 are noticeably unaccounted for. The treatment of Amenmesse as a rival king also best explains the pattern of destruction to Seti II's tomb which was initially ransacked and later restored again by Seti II's officials. This implies that the respective reigns of Amenmesse and Seti II were parallel to one another; Seti II must have initially controlled Thebes in his first and second years during which time his tomb was excavated and partly decorated. Then Seti was ousted from power in Upper Egypt by Amenmesse whose agents desecrated Seti II's tomb. Seti would finally defeat his rival Amenmesse and return to Thebes in triumph whereupon he ordered the restoration of his damaged tomb.

Rolf Krauss, followed by Aidan Dodson, suggests that Amenmesse was once a Kushite Viceroy called Messuy. In particular, two representations of Messuy on the temple of Amida allegedly show that a royal uraeus had been added to his brows in a way consistent with other pharaohs such as Horemheb, Merneptah and some of the sons of Rameses III. An inscription at the temple of Amada also calls him "the king's son himself" but this may be merely a figure of speech to emphasize Messuy's high stature as Viceroy under Merneptah. However, Frank Yurco notes that various depictions of Messuy in several Nubian temples were never deliberately defaced by Seti II's agents compared to the damnatio memoriae meted out to all depictions of another Viceroy of Kush, Khaemtir, who had served as Amenmesse's Vizier. This strongly implies that Seti II held no grudge against Messuy, which would be improbable if Messuy was indeed Amenmesse. Yurco also observes that the only objects from Messuy's tomb which identified a Pharaoh all named only Merneptah, Seti II's father, which leads to the conclusion that Messuy died and was buried in his tomb at Aniba, Nubia, during Merneptah's reign, and could not be Amenmesse.

The records of a court case early in the reign of Seti II also throw some light on the matter. Papyrus Salt 124 records that Neferhotep, one of the two chief workmen of the Deir el-Medina necropolis, had been killed during the reign of Amenmesse (the king's name is written as Msy in the document). Neferhotep was replaced by Paneb his adopted son, against whom many crimes were alleged by Neferhotep's brother Amennakhte in a strongly-worded indictment preserved on a papyrus in the British Museum. If Amennakhte's allegations can be trusted, Paneb had stolen stone for the embellishment of his own tomb from that of Seti II in the course of its completion, besides purloining or damaging other property belonging to that monarch. Also he had allegedly tried to kill Neferhotep in spite of having been educated by him, and after the chief workman had been killed by "the enemy" had bribed the vizier Pra'emhab in order to usurp his place. Whatever the truth of these accusations, it is clear that Thebes was going through very troubled times. There are references elsewhere to a "war" that had occurred during these years, but it is obscure to what this word alludes—perhaps to no more than internal disturbances and discontent. Neferhotep had complained of the attacks upon himself to the vizier Amenmose, presumably a predecessor of Pra'emhab, whereupon Amenmose had Paneb punished. Paneb, however, then successfully brought a complaint before 'Mose'/'Msy' whereupon the latter decided to dismiss Amenmose from office. Evidently this 'Mose'/'Msy' was a person of the highest importance who most probably should be identified with king Amenmesse himself.

== Family ==
His mother is known to be Queen Takhat, but who she is exactly is a matter of interpretation complicated by inscriptions being revised by Seti II and Amenmesse. Among her titles are "King's Daughter", which would make her a daughter of Merneptah or Ramesses II or possibly a granddaughter of Ramesses. The name Takhat appears in a list of princesses dated to Year 53 of Ramesses II (Louvre 666). If this is the same Takhat, she would be about the same age as Seti II.

A monument from Karnak, carved while Amenmesse was in control of the area, includes the relief of a woman titled "King's Daughter" and "King's Mother". The monument was reinscribed from 'Mother' to 'Wife'. Another statue of Seti II (Cairo CG1198) bears Seti's name surcharged over someone else's while the names of Takhat were left alone. This suggests that Takhat was married to Seti as well as mother to Amenmesse. Others such as Frank Yurco believe Takhat was wife to Merneptah making the rivals Seti II and Amenmesse half-brothers.

Some assume that Twosret, wife of Seti II, was his sister. Amenmesse's wife was thought to be a woman named Baktwerel since she was buried in the same tomb as Amenmesse, KV10. Three mummies were initially present in this tomb, two women and one man. It is uncertain if any of these remains belong to Amenmesse, Takhat, or Baketwerel. The two females Baketwerel and Takhat could have been buried later. Some people believe that Seti II broke into the tomb and had Amenmesse's remains desecrated since his mummy was never found.

Six quartzite statues originally placed along the axis of the hypostyle hall in the Amun Temple at Karnak are thought to be his, although these were defaced and overwritten with the name of Seti II. One of these statues, with the inscription, "the Great Royal Wife Takhat", lends credence to the argument that a Takhat was Amenmesse's wife. Amenmesse was also responsible for restoring a shrine dating from Thutmose III that stands before a temple at El-Tod.

There is confusion about the events surrounding his death. His mummy was not amongst those found in the cache at Deir el Bahri, and from the destruction of his tomb in the Valley of the Kings, it is assumed that Seti II took revenge upon his usurping half-brother.

== Aftermath ==
Amenmesse was buried in a rock-cut tomb in the Valley of the Kings which is now identified as Tomb KV10. However, almost all of its texts and scenes were either erased or usurped by Seti II's agents. No mention of Amenmesse was spared. A number of officials associated with Amenmesse were also attacked or replaced, chief among them being the Theban High Priest of Amun, Roma called Roy, and Khaemtir, a former viceroy of Kush, who may have supported Amenmesse's usurpation.

Amenmesse's tomb was looted in antiquity. However the remains of three mummies were found in this tomb, two women and one man, it is uncertain if any of these remains belong to Amenmesse, Takhat or the later Baketwerel without further testing or whether they were later intrusions. It seems more likely, however, that Seti II had Amenmesse's remains desecrated since his mummy was never found "in either of the two great caches of royal mummies found in 1881 and 1901". Surviving inscriptions mentioning Takhat's name along with the wall inscriptions suggest she was buried in Amenmesse's tomb. Artifacts from the tombs of Seti I and Rameses VI were also found in the KV10 tomb adding to the uncertainty. After his death, Seti II also conducted a damnatio memoriae campaign against the memory of Amenmesse's Vizier, Khaemtir. Egyptologist Frank Yurco notes that Seti II's agents erased all of Khaemtir's depictions and inscriptions—even those that were inscribed when Khaemtir served as a Viceroy in Nubia.

It is possible that Siptah, the Pharaoh who succeeded Seti II, was the son of Amenmesse and not of Seti II. A statue of Siptah in Munich shows the Pharaoh seated in the lap of another, clearly his father. The statue of the father, however, has been destroyed. Dodson writes:

The only ruler of the period who could have promoted such destruction was Amenmesse, and likewise he is the only king whose offspring required such explicit promotion. The destruction of this figure is likely to have closely followed the fall of Bay or the death of Siptah himself, when any short-lived rehabilitation of Amenmesse will have ended.

M. Georg and Rolf Krauss find that there are a number of parallels between the story of Amenmesse and the biblical story of Moses in Egypt.

== Bibliography ==
- Cardon, Patrick D. “Amenmesse: An Egyptian Royal Head of the Nineteenth Dynasty in the Metropolitan Museum.” MMJ 14 (1979): 5-14.
- Dodson, Aidan. “The Takhats and Some Other Royal Ladies of the Ramesside Period.” JEA 73 (1987): 224-29.
- ________. and Dyan Hilton, “The Complete Royal Families of Ancient Egypt“, Thames & Hudson, 2004.
- ________. “Death after Death in the Valley of the Kings.” In Death and Taxes in the Ancient Near East, ed. Sara E. Orel, 53-59. Lewiston, New York: Edwin Mellen Press, 1992.
- ________. “Amenmesse in Kent, Liverpool, and Thebes.” JEA 81 (1995): 115-28.
- ________. "Messuy, Amada and Amenmesse." JARCE 34 (1997): 41-48.
- Habachi, Labib. “King Amenmesse and Viziers Amenmose and Kha’emtore: Their Monuments and Place in History.” MDAIK 34 (1978): 39-67.
- Kitchen, Kenneth A. “The Titularies of the Ramesside Kings as Expression of Their Ideal Kingship.” ASAE 71 (1987): 131-41.
- Krauss, Rolf. “Untersuchungen zu König Amenmesse (1.Teil).” SAK 4 (1976): 161-99.
- ________. “Untersuchungen zu König Amenmesse (2. Teil).” SAK 5 (1977): 131-74.
- ________. “Untersuchungen zu König Amenmesse: Nachträge.” SAK 24 (1997): 161-84.
- Vandersleyen, Claude. ĽÉgypte et la Vallée du Nil. Vol. 2, De la fin de ľAncien Empire á la fin du Nouvel Empire. Paris: Presses Universitaires de France, 1995
- Wente, Edward and Charles Van Siclen III. "A Chronology of the New Kingdom." In Studies in Honor of George R. Hughes: January 12, 1977, 217-61. Chicago: The Oriental Institute, 1976.
- Yurco, Frank Joseph. “Was Amenmesse the Viceroy of Kush, Messuwy?,” JARCE 34 (1997): 49-56.
