= New Kingdom of Egypt =

Period in ancient Egyptian history (c. 1570–1069 BC)

- c. 1570 – c. 1069 BC
- Egyptian territory under the New Kingdom, c. 15th century BC
- Capital: Thebes c. 1570–1352 BC Dynasty XVII and Dynasty XVIII (until Akhenaten); Amarna c. 1352–1336 BC Akhenaten of Dynasty XVIII; Thebes c. 1336–1279 BC Dynasty XVIII and Dynasty XIX (until Ramesses II); Pi-Ramesses c. 1279–1213 BC Ramesses II of Dynasty XIX; Memphis c. 1213–1069 BC Dynasty XIX (from Merneptah) and Dynasty XX
- Common languages: Egyptian, Kushite, Canaanite, Amorite
- Religion: Egyptian religion; Atenism (during the Amarna Period); Canaanite religion; Kushite religion
- Government: Divine absolute monarchy
- Pharaoh
  - c. 1570 – 1525 BC: Ahmose I (first)
  - c. 1107 – 1077 BC: Ramesses XI (last)
- History
  - Rise: c. 1570 BC
  - Downfall: c. 1069 BC

Population
  - c. 13th century BC: 3 to 5 million
| Preceded by | Succeeded by |
| Second Intermediate Period of Egypt | Third Intermediate Period of Egypt |

The New Kingdom, also called the Egyptian Empire, refers to ancient Egypt between the 16th century BC and the 11th century BC. This period of ancient Egyptian history covers the Eighteenth, Nineteenth, and Twentieth dynasties. Through radiocarbon dating, the establishment of the New Kingdom has been placed between 1570 and 1544 BC. The New Kingdom followed the Second Intermediate Period and was succeeded by the Third Intermediate Period. It was the most prosperous time for ancient Egypt and marked the peak of its power.

In 1845, the concept of a "New Kingdom" as one of three "golden ages" was coined by German scholar Christian Charles Josias von Bunsen; the original definition would evolve significantly throughout the 19th and 20th centuries. The later part of this period, under the Nineteenth Dynasty (1295–1189 BC) and the Twentieth Dynasty (1189–1069 BC), is also known as the Ramesside period. It is named after the eleven pharaohs who took the name Ramesses, after Ramesses I, who founded the Nineteenth Dynasty, and his grandson Ramesses II, who was its longest-reigning monarch.

Possibly as a result of the foreign rule of the Hyksos during the Second Intermediate Period, the New Kingdom saw a historic expansion into the Levant, thus marking Egypt's greatest territorial extent. Similarly, in response to attacks by the Kushites, who led raids into Egypt during the Second Intermediate Period, the rulers of the New Kingdom felt compelled to expand far into Nubia and to hold wider territories in the Near East, particularly on the Levantine frontier.

== Eighteenth Dynasty ==
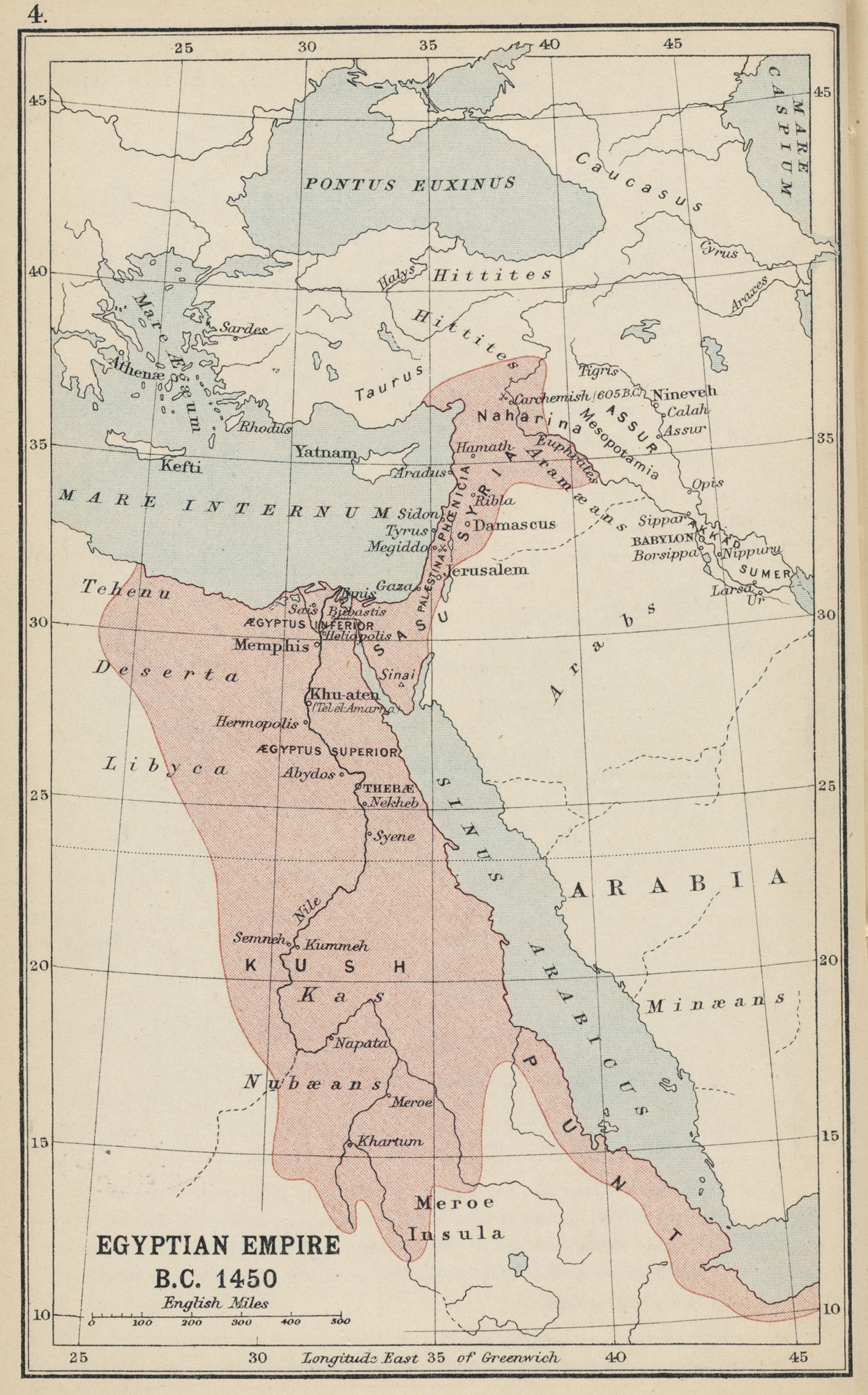
The maximum borders of the Egyptian Empire 1450 BC

The Eighteenth Dynasty included some of Egypt's most famous kings, including Ahmose I, Hatshepsut, Thutmose III, Amenhotep III, Akhenaten, and Tutankhamun.

Ahmose I is viewed to be the founder of the eighteenth dynasty. He continued the campaigns of his father Seqenenre Tao and of Kamose against the Hyksos until he reunified the country once more. Ahmose would then continue to campaign in the Levant, the home of the Hyksos, to prevent any future invasions on Egypt.

Ahmose was followed by Amenhotep I, who campaigned in Nubia and was followed by Thutmose I. Thutmose I campaigned in the Levant and reached as far as the Euphrates, thus becoming the first pharaoh to cross the river. During this campaign, the Syrian princes declared allegiance to Thutmose. However, after he returned, they discontinued tribute and began fortifying against future incursions.

Hatshepsut was one of the most powerful pharaohs of this dynasty. She was the daughter of Thutmose I and the royal wife of Thutmose II. Upon the death of her husband, she ruled jointly with his son by a minor wife, Thutmose III, who had ascended to the throne as a child of about two years of age, but eventually she ruled in her own right. Hatshepsut built extensively in the Karnak temple in Luxor and throughout all of Egypt and she re-established the trade networks that had been disrupted during the Hyksos rule of Lower Egypt during the Second Intermediate Period, thereby building the wealth of the Eighteenth Dynasty. She oversaw the preparations and funding for a mission to the Land of Punt. After her death, having gained valuable experience heading up the military for Hatshepsut, Thutmose III assumed rule.

Thutmose III expanded Egypt's army and wielded it with great success to consolidate the empire created by his predecessors. This resulted in a peak in Egypt's power and wealth during the reign of Amenhotep III. The term pharaoh, originally the name of the king's palace, became a form of address for the person who was king during his reign (c. 1479–1425 BC).

Widely considered a military genius by historians, Thutmose III conducted at least 16 campaigns in 20 years. He was an active expansionist ruler. He is recorded to have captured 350 cities during his rule and conquered much of the Near East from the Euphrates to Nubia during seventeen known military campaigns. He was the first pharaoh after Thutmose I to cross the Euphrates, doing so during his campaign against Mitanni. He continued north through the territory belonging to the still unconquered cities of Aleppo and Carchemish and quickly crossed the Euphrates in his boats, taking the Mitannian king entirely by surprise.

The wealthiest of all the kings of this dynasty is Amenhotep III, who built the Luxor Temple, the Precinct of Monthu at Karnak and his massive Mortuary Temple. Amenhotep III also built the Malkata palace, the largest built in Egypt.

=== Amarna Period ===
One of the best-known eighteenth dynasty pharaohs is Amenhotep IV, who changed his name to Akhenaten in honour of the Aten, a representation of the Egyptian god, Ra. His worship of the Aten as his personal deity is often interpreted as history's first instance of monotheism. Akhenaten's wife, Nefertiti, contributed a great deal to his new direction in the Egyptian religion. Nefertiti was bold enough to perform rituals to Aten. Akhenaten's religious fervour is cited as the reason why he and his wife were subsequently written out of Egyptian history. Under his reign, in the fourteenth century BC, Egyptian art flourished in a distinctive new style (see Amarna Period).

The Amarna Period (1348-1320 BCE) is a period of Egyptian history when the royal residence of the pharaoh shifted from the old capital of Thebes (Waset) to the desert plain of Akhet-Aten (modern-day Amarna). This move occurred during the reign of Akhenaten (formerly Amenhotep IV) to solidify the dramatic change from Egypt's polytheistic religion into a monotheistic religion, where the sun disc Aten was worshipped over all other gods. This period's great religious reforms are echoed in its distinct art style. The Amarna Period ended when Tutankhamun moved the capital back to Thebes and restored the polytheistic religion.

The god Aten, Pharaoh Akhenaten, Queen Nefertiti, and three young princesses in Amarna period art.

By the end of the Eighteenth Dynasty, Egypt's status had changed radically. Aided by Akhenaten's apparent lack of interest in international affairs, the Hittites had gradually extended their influence into the Levant to become a major power in international politics—a power that both Seti I and his son Ramesses II would confront during the nineteenth Dynasty.

The last two members of the Eighteenth Dynasty—Ay and Horemheb—became rulers from the ranks of officials in the royal court, although Ay might also have been the maternal uncle of Akhenaten and a fellow descendant of Yuya and Tjuyu.

Ay may have married the widowed Great Royal Wife and young half-sister of Tutankhamun, Ankhesenamun, in order to obtain power; she did not live long afterward. Ay then married Tey, who originally had been wet-nurse to Nefertiti.

Ay's reign was short. His successor was Horemheb, a general during the reign of Tutankhamun, whom the pharaoh may have intended as his successor in the event that he had no surviving children, which came to pass. Horemheb may have taken the throne away from Ay in a coup d'état. Although Ay's son or stepson Nakhtmin was named as his father or stepfather's Crown Prince, Nakhtmin seems to have died during the reign of Ay, leaving the opportunity for Horemheb to claim the throne next.

Horemheb also died without surviving children, having appointed his vizier, Pa-ra-mes-su, as his heir. This vizier ascended the throne in 1292 BC as Ramesses I, and was the first pharaoh of the Nineteenth Dynasty.

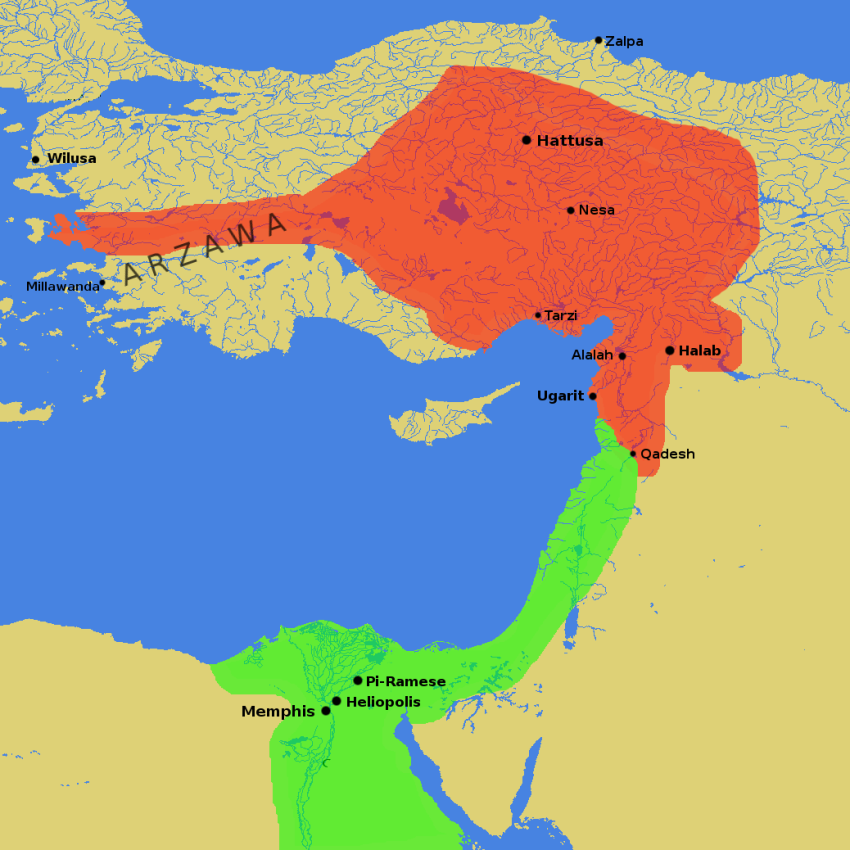
Egyptian and Hittite empires, around the time of the Battle of Kadesh

== Nineteenth Dynasty ==
The Nineteenth Dynasty was founded by the Vizier Ramesses I, whom the last ruler of the eighteenth dynasty, Pharaoh Horemheb, had chosen as his successor. His brief reign marked a transition period between the reign of Horemheb and the powerful pharaohs of this dynasty, in particular, his son Seti I and grandson Ramesses II, who would bring Egypt to new heights of imperial power.

Seti I fought a series of wars in western Asia, Libya, and Nubia in the first decade of his reign. The main source for knowledge of Seti's military activities are his battle scenes on the north exterior wall of the Karnak Hypostyle Hall, along with several royal stelas with inscriptions mentioning battles in Canaan and Nubia. The greatest achievement of Seti I's foreign policy was the capture of the Syrian town of Kadesh and neighboring territory of Amurru from the Hittite Empire. Egypt had not held Kadesh since the time of Akhenaten. Seti I was successful in defeating a Hittite army that tried to defend the town and erected a victory stela at the site which has been found by archaeologists. Kadesh, however, soon reverted to Hittite control because the Egyptians did not or could not maintain a permanent military occupation of Kadesh and Amurru which were close to the Hittite homelands.

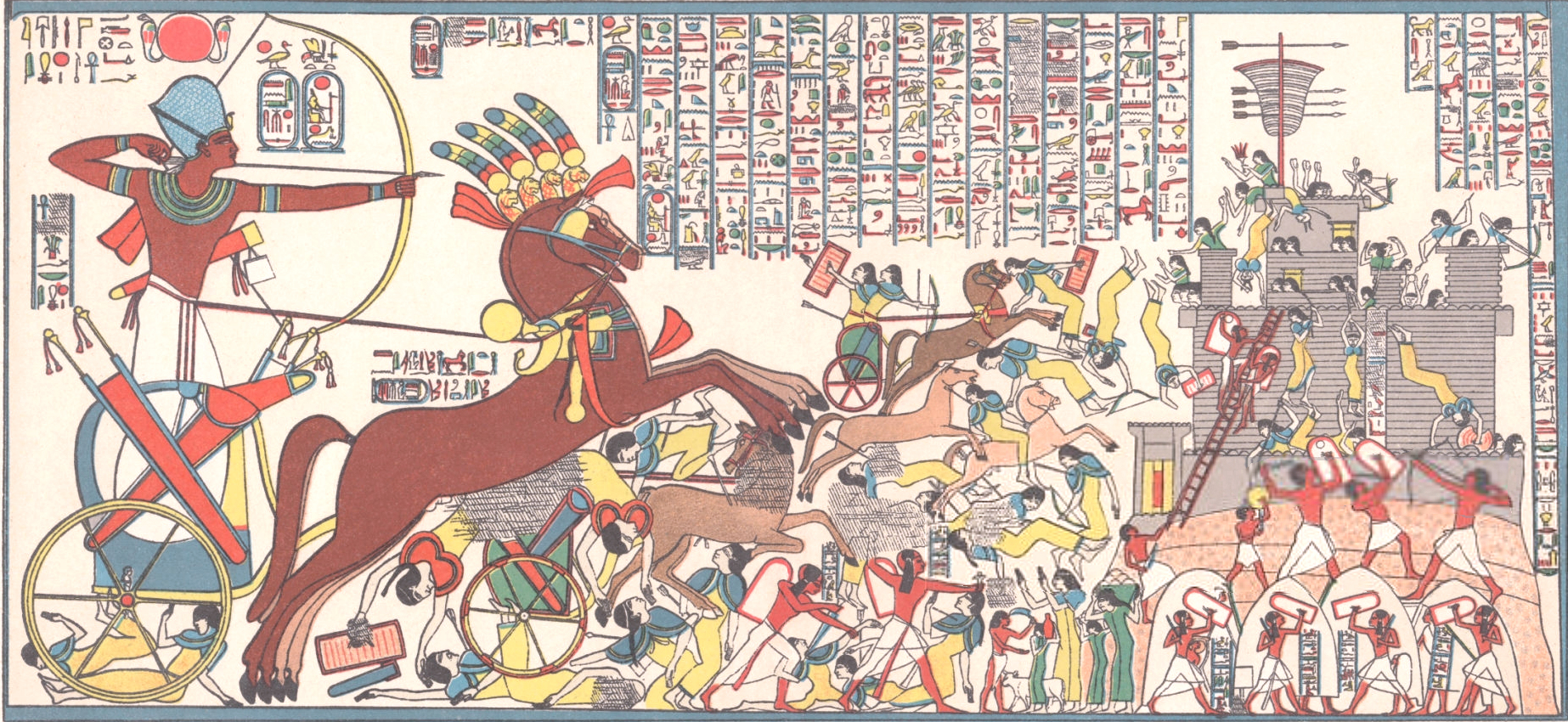
Color reproduction of the relief depicting Ramesses II storming the Hittite fortress of Dapur

Ramesses II sought to recover territories in the Levant that had been held by the 18th Dynasty. In his second year, before confronting the Hittites, Ramesses II had to deal with a raid by the Sherden sea people whom he defeated and incorporated into his army. His campaigns against the Hittites culminated in the Battle of Kadesh, where he led Egyptian armies against those of the Hittite king Muwatalli II. Ramesses was caught in history's first recorded military ambush, although he was able to rally his troops and turn the tide of battle against the Hittites thanks to the arrival of the Ne'arin (possibly mercenaries in the employ of Egypt). The outcome of the battle was undecided, with both sides claiming victory at their home front, and ultimately resulting in a peace treaty between the two governments. He campaigned later in the Levant capturing Edom and Moab. New kingdom Egyptian stelae from this period have been found in Jordan. Later, Egyptians conquered Qatna and Tunip where a statue of Ramses II was erected. Thus he recaptured Qadesh and northern Amurru. Nevertheless, like Seti I, he found that he could not permanently hold territory so far from base and after years of conflict, a peace treaty was concluded between the two states. Egypt was able to obtain wealth and stability under the rule of Ramesses, for more than half a century. His immediate successors continued the military campaigns, although an increasingly troubled court—which at one point put a usurper (Amenmesse) on the throne—made it increasingly difficult for a pharaoh to effectively retain control of the territories.

Ramesses II built extensively throughout Egypt and Nubia, and his cartouches are prominently displayed, even in buildings that he did not construct. There are accounts of his honor hewn on stone, statues, and the remains of palaces and temples—most notably the Ramesseum in western Thebes and the rock temples of Abu Simbel. He covered the land from the Delta to Nubia with buildings in a way no king before him had. He also founded a new capital city in the Delta during his reign, called Pi-Ramesses. It previously had served as a summer palace during the reign of Seti I.

Ramesses II constructed many large monuments, including the archaeological complex of Abu Simbel, and the Mortuary temple known as the Ramesseum. He built on a monumental scale to ensure that his legacy would survive the ravages of time. Ramesses used art as a means of propaganda for his victories over foreigners, which are depicted on numerous temple reliefs. Ramesses II erected more colossal statues of himself than any other pharaoh, and also usurped many existing statues by inscribing his own cartouche on them.

Ramesses II was also famed for the huge number of children he sired by his various wives and concubines; the tomb he built for his sons (many of whom he outlived) in the Valley of the Kings has proven to be the largest funerary complex in Egypt.

=== Civil war ===
The immediate successors of Ramesses II continued the military campaigns although an increasingly troubled court complicated matters. He was succeeded by his son Merneptah and then by Merneptah's son Seti II. Seti II's right to the throne seems to have been disputed by his half-brother Amenmesse, who may have temporarily ruled from Thebes.

Upon his death, Seti II's son Siptah, who may have been afflicted with poliomyelitis during his life, was appointed to the throne by Bay, a chancellor and a West Asian commoner who served as vizier behind the scenes. Siptah died early and throne was assumed by Twosret, who was the royal wife of his father and, possibly, his uncle Amenmesse's sister.

A period of anarchy at the end of Twosret's short reign saw the enthronement of Setnakhte, establishing the Twentieth Dynasty.

== Twentieth Dynasty ==
The last "great" pharaoh from the New Kingdom is widely considered to be Ramesses III, a Twentieth Dynasty pharaoh who reigned several decades after Ramesses II.

In the eighth year of Ramesses III's reign, Egyptian inscriptions record campaigns against several foreign groups conventionally grouped by modern scholars under the term "Sea Peoples", including a naval engagement and a land battle. They invaders were subsequently defeated in the Battle of Djahy and the Battle of the Delta. He incorporated them as subject peoples and is thought to have settled them in Southern Canaan, although there is evidence that they forced their way into Canaan. Their presence in Canaan may have contributed to the formation of new states, such as the Philistian pentapolis, in this region after the collapse of the Egyptian Empire (In the reign of Ramses III himself, Egyptian presence in the Levant is still attested as far as Byblos). He later was compelled to fight invading Libyan tribesmen in two major campaigns in Egypt's Western Delta in his sixth year and eleventh year respectively.

The heavy cost of this warfare slowly drained Egypt's treasury and contributed to the gradual decline of the Egyptian Empire in Asia. The severity of the difficulties is indicated by the fact that the first known labour strike in recorded history occurred during the twenty-ninth year of Ramesses III's reign. At that time, the food rations for Egypt's favoured and elite royal tomb-builders and artisans in the village of Deir el Medina could not be provisioned. Air pollution limited the amount of sunlight penetrating the atmosphere, affecting agricultural production and arresting global tree growth for almost two full decades, until 1140 BC. One proposed cause is the Hekla 3 eruption of the Hekla volcano in Iceland, but the dating of this remains disputed.

Near the end of Ramesses III's reign, one of his secondary wives plotted to assassinate the king in her quest to place her son on the throne. Palace personnel, the harem, government officials, and army officers participated in the plot. A special court of 12 judges was formed to try the defendants who were sentenced to death. Written sources show that the coup failed and that the conspirators were successfully tried. However, it is not clear from the documents whether Ramses survived the assassination attempt. The king's mummy showed no visible wounds, and questions about his fate were left open to speculation for many years. In 2012, researchers announced that a CT scan had revealed a deep knife wound in the mummy's throat, indicating that Ramesses was indeed killed by the conspirators. He died in Thebes in the 32nd year of his reign and was succeeded by Crown Prince Ramesses IV.

A number of raids by the Libyans and the Sea Peoples, more dangerous than those during the reign of Ramses III, drew the kingdom to more weakness. This increased the influence of the priests of Amon, which finally led to control of the throne by the great priests.

=== Decline into the Third Intermediate Period ===
Ramesses III's death was followed by years of bickering among his heirs. Three of his sons ascended the throne successively as Ramesses IV, Rameses VI, and Rameses VIII. Egypt was increasingly beset by droughts, below-normal flooding of the Nile, famine, civil unrest, and corruption of officials. The power of the last pharaoh of the dynasty, Ramesses XI, grew so weak that in the south the High Priests of Amun at Thebes became the de facto rulers of Upper Egypt, and Smendes controlled Lower Egypt in the north, even before Rameses XI's death. Smendes eventually founded the twenty-first dynasty at Tanis.

== Gallery ==
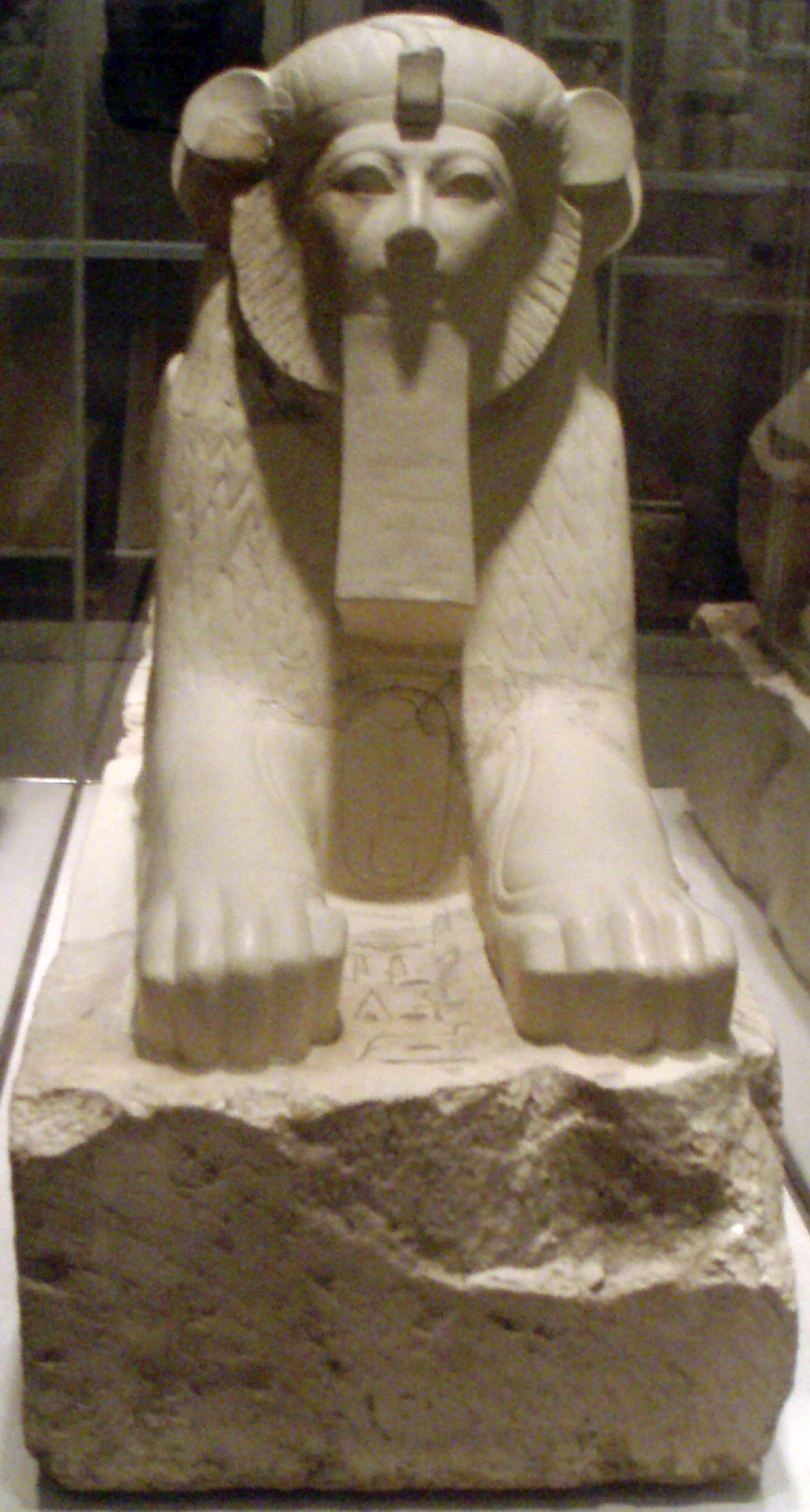
Hatshepsut as a Sphinx - daughter of Thutmose I, co-regent for her two-year-old stepson Thutmose III, she soon ruled as pharaoh; Egypt prospered greatly under her rule

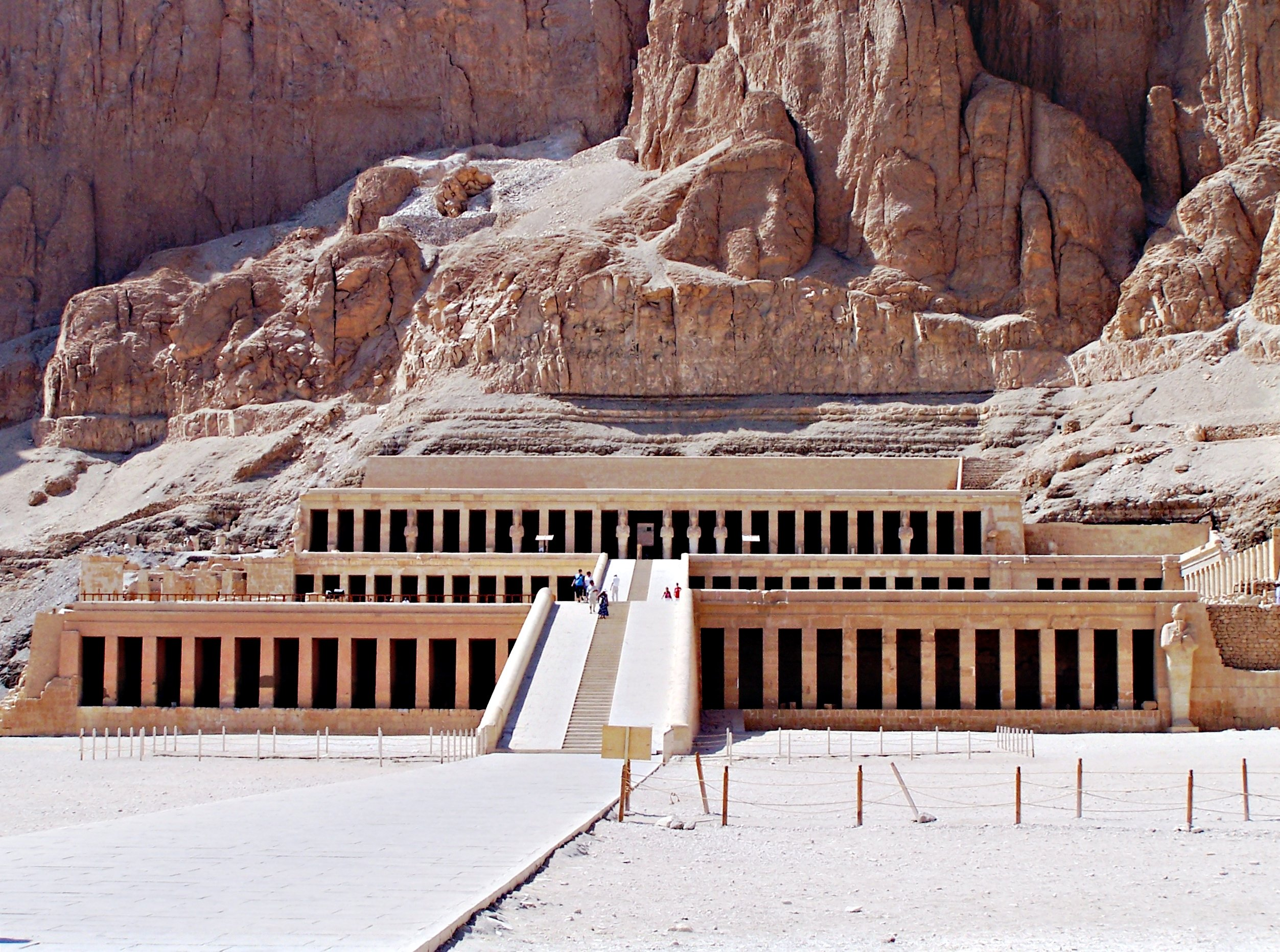
The Mortuary Temple of Hatshepsut at Deir el-Bahari was called Djeser-Djeseru, meaning the Holy of Holies

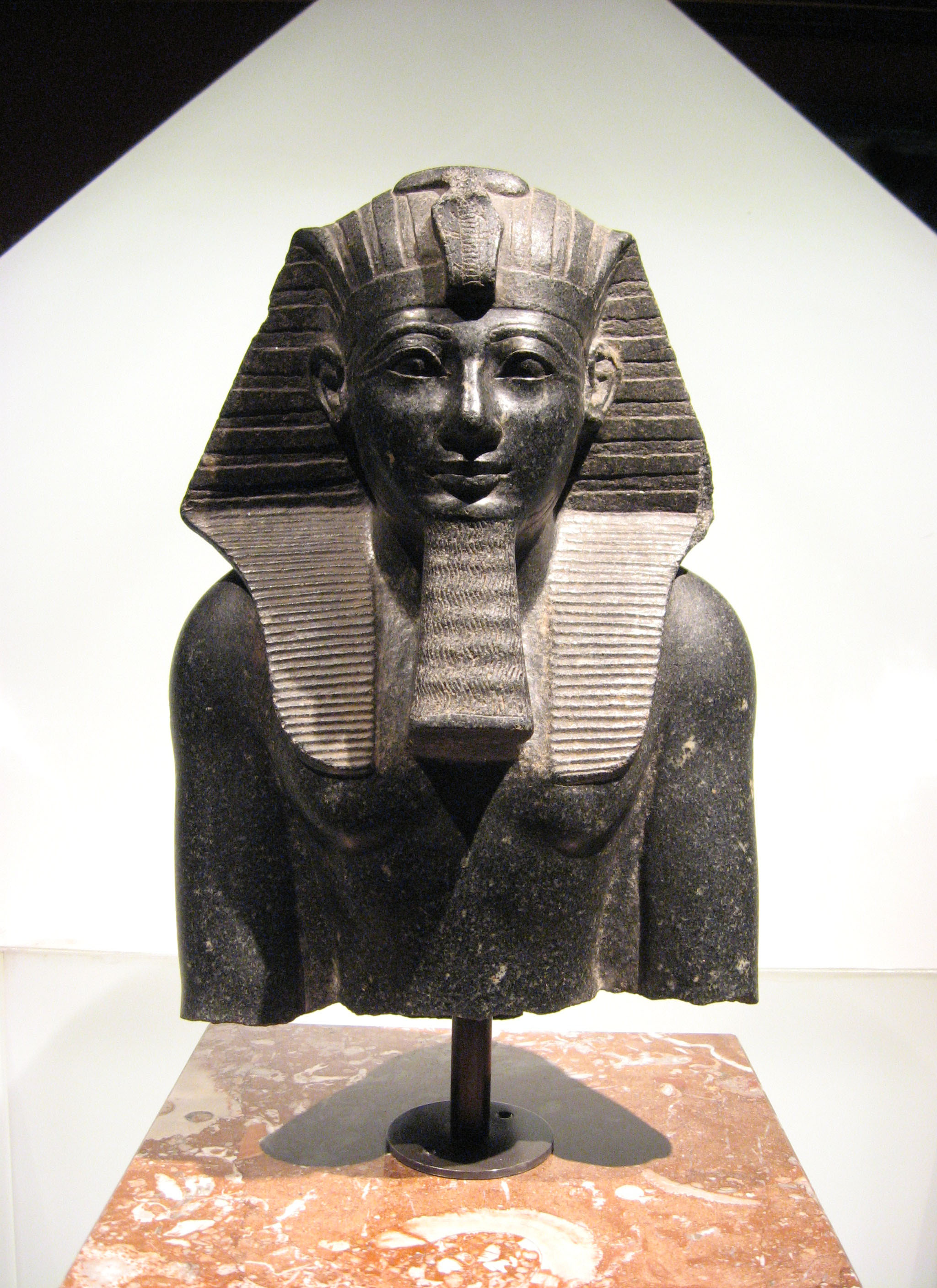
Thutmosis III, a military man and member of the Thutmosid royal line is commonly called the Napoleon of Egypt because his conquests of the Levant brought Egypt's territories and influence to its greatest extent

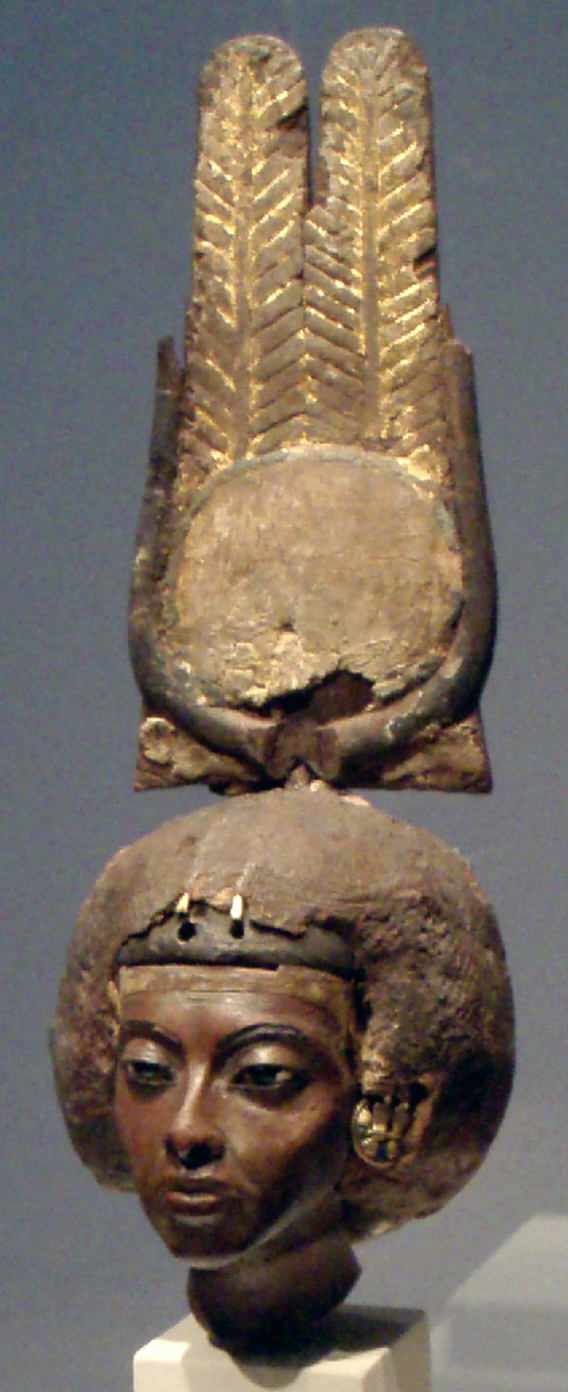
Tiye, born a commoner, became queen through her marriage to Amenhotep III and during the New Kingdom, when women gained influence in court, Tiye soon helped run affairs of state for both her husband and son during their reigns

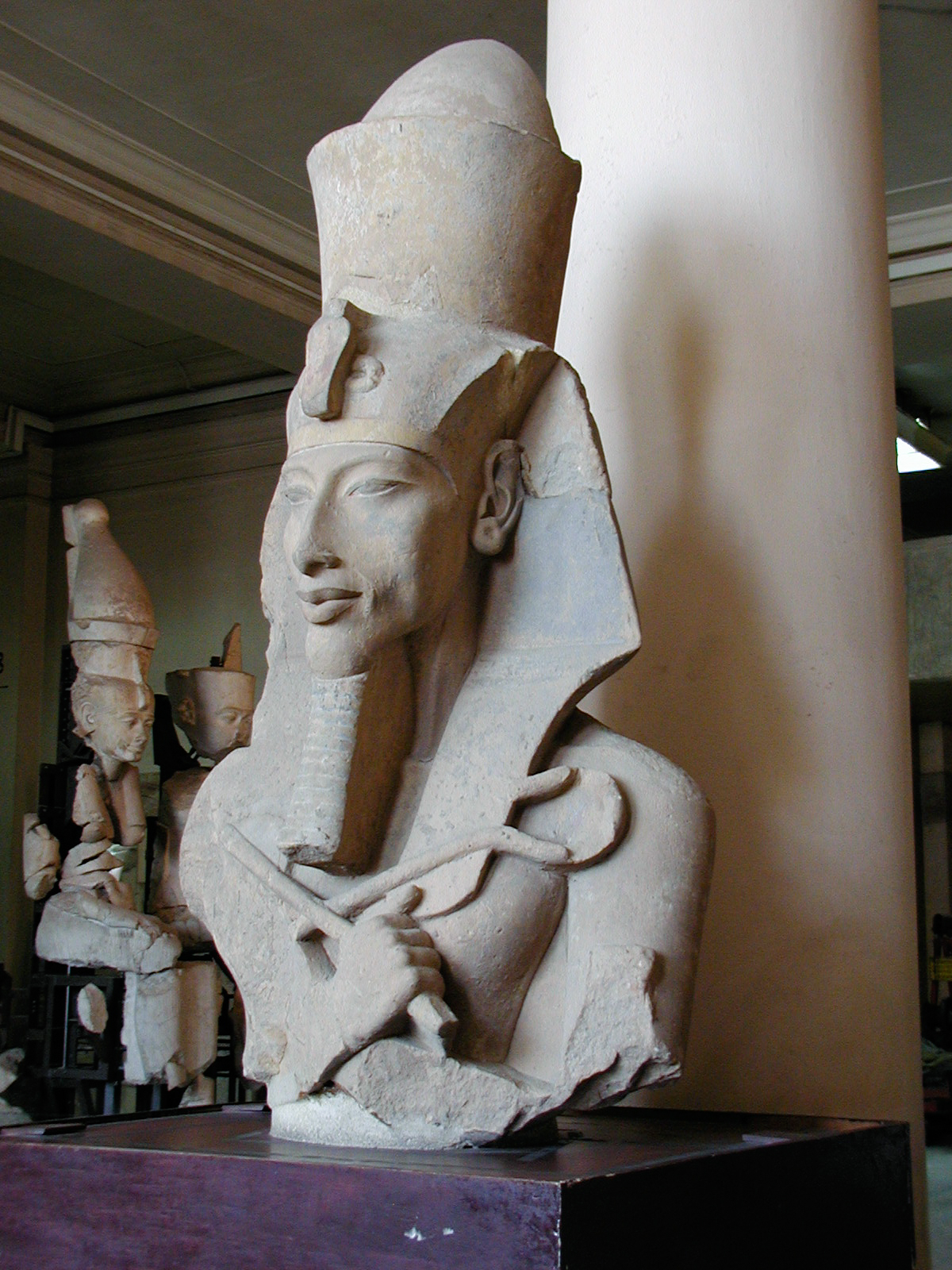
Akhenaten, born Amenhotep IV, was the son of Queen Tiye and he turned away from the dominant cult of Amun, relocated the capitol, and promoted that of the Aten as a supreme deity

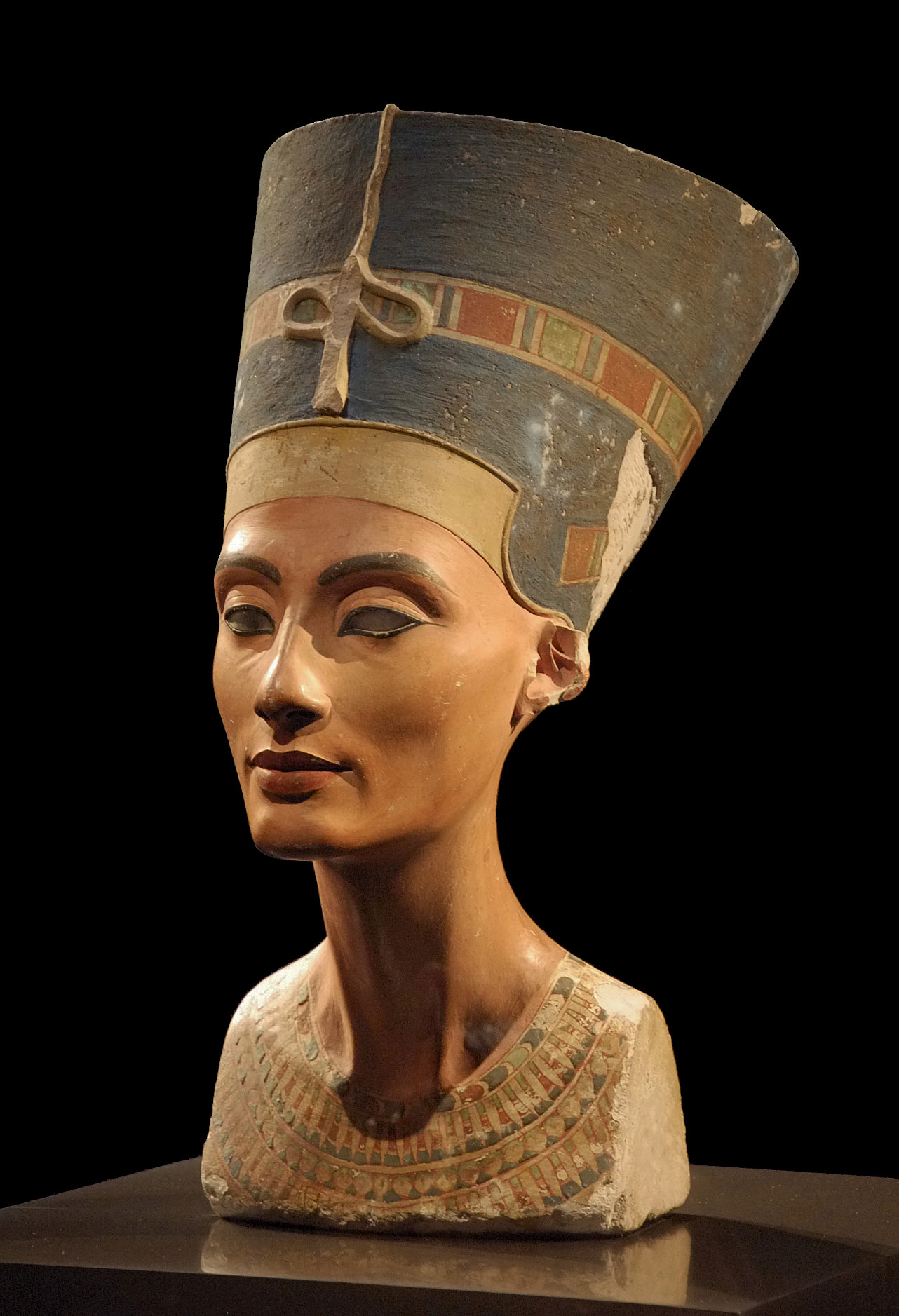
Nefertiti - the wife of Akhenaten, she held position as co-regent with Akhenaten and may have ruled later as pharaoh in her own right (as she is one of few candidates for the identity of Pharaoh Neferneferuaten)

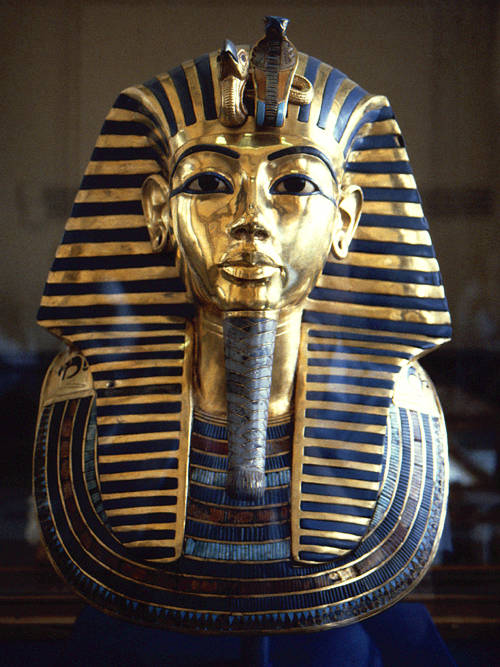
Tutankhamun's mask - King Tutankhamun, son of Akhenaten, returned to the former capitol and restored the cult of Amun to its former influence; although he died young and was not considered significant in his own time, the 1922 discovery of his KV62 intact tomb by Howard Carter, made him relevant as a symbol of ancient Egypt to the modern world

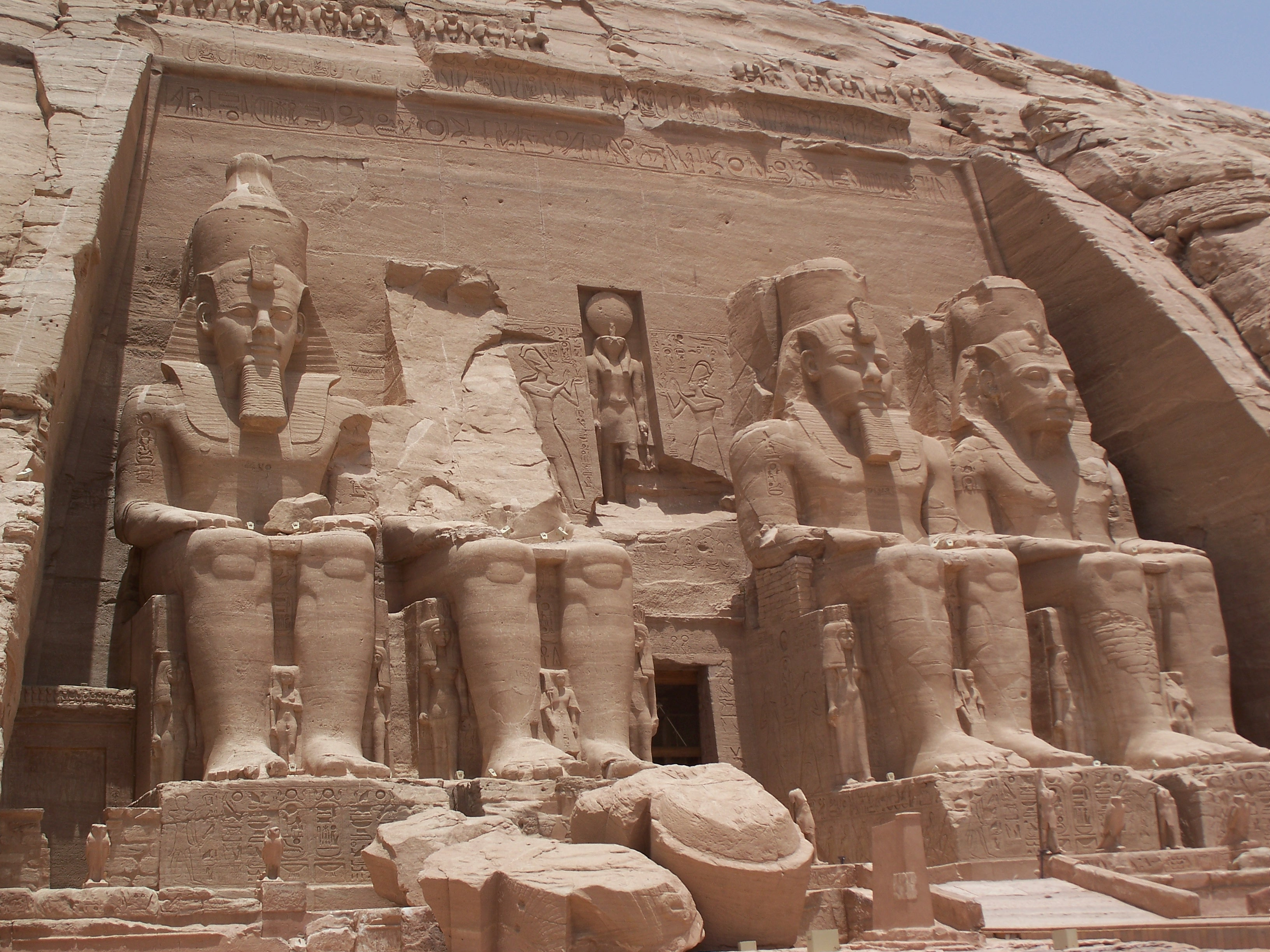
Abu Simbel Temple of Ramesses II

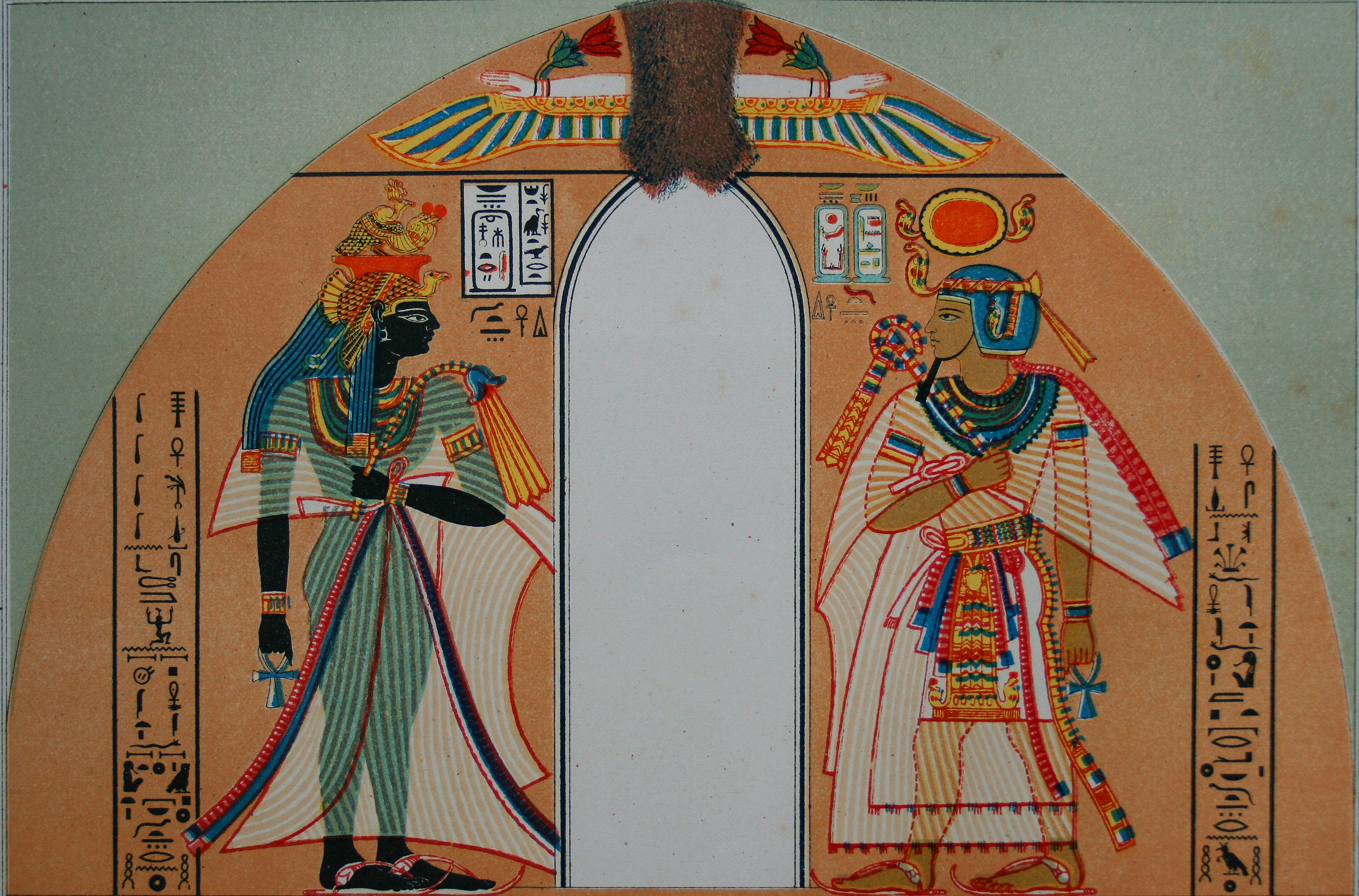
Queen Ahmose-Nefertari

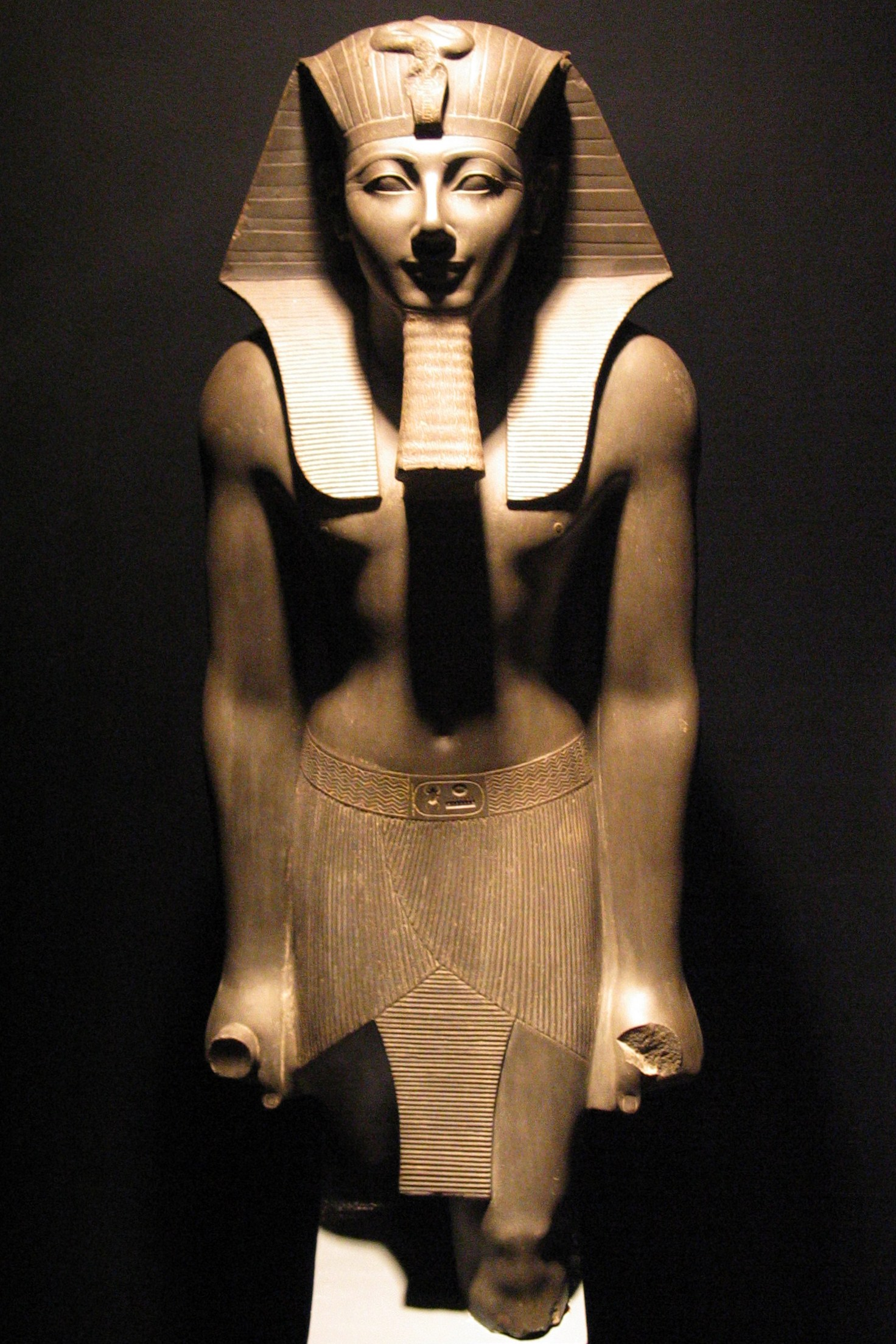
Egyptian pharaoh Thutmose III in his youth

== See also ==
- History of ancient Egypt
- Mesn

| Preceded by Second Intermediate Period | Time Periods of Egypt; 1550–1069 BC | Succeeded by Third Intermediate Period |
