= Mesen, Egypt =

Ancient Egyptian City

Mesen (or Mesn) is an ancient Egyptian New Kingdom city that has not been definitively located. Newly discovered archaeological evidence, however, suggests the site is located at Tell Abu Seifi in the Sinai. The Egyptian Ministry of Tourism and Antiquities made the announcement of the find on August 15, 2026.

== Location ==
The city, founded during the time of Ramesses II (Note: Ramesses II is the pharaoh most often associated with Moses and the Exodus of the Jews), has been referred to numerous times in ancient Egyptian writings, but historians had found few indications of the settlement's actual location. The summer 2026 discovery of a massive lintel, broken in half but still bearing legible inscriptions on three sides, strongly indicates the ancient fortified location was at the Tell Abu Seifi site in the Qantara region of Ismailia Governorate, northern Sinai. It is considered a long-lost stop along the Way of Horus—a well-used military road of the ancient Egyptians linking the Nile Delta area to the Levant. (Note: The Way of Horus was later called the Via Maris while the area was under Roman influence.)

== Ongoing excavations and findings ==
The inscription on the massive sandstone lintel refers to the Egyptian deity Horus as the Lord of Mesen. The lintel was found near the remains of a fortified temple complex, lending additional credence to the site being long lost Mesen. Recent excavations have uncovered a defensive trench, believed to be a common feature to the Way of Horus. This latest uncovered section of the tell features a wide, once tree-lined limestone highway, that had run alongside housing or barracks units. Additional finds include a 26th Dynasty statue of a military scribe carved from schist. It is believed Mesen functioned first (and alternately later) as a military compound, then through the Ptolemaic period as a religious gathering place, then a Roman castrum, and finally as a lime quarry. Later periods show signs of reuse of abandoned buildings and materials as industrial facilities.

== See also ==
- Biblical archaeology
- Egyptian mythology
