= Amenemopet (Viceroy of Kush) =

Ancient Egyptian official, Viceroy of Kush

- Viceroy of Kush
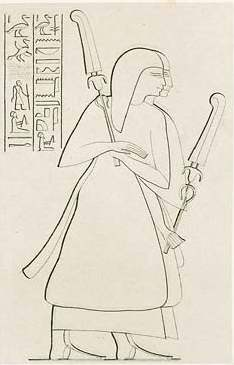
- Amenemopet at Beit el-Wali
- Predecessor: Paser I
- Successor: Yuny
- Dynasty: 19th Dynasty
- Pharaoh: Seti I, Ramesses II
- Father: Paser I

Amenemopet served as Viceroy of Kush during the reign of Seti I.

Amenemopet was the son of the Viceroy of Kush named Paser I and thus the grandson of the Viceroy Amenhotep-Huy and his wife Taemwadjsy.

Amenemopet had a distinguished career. He served as the first charioteer of His Majesty, Fan-bearer on the Right Side of the King, governor of the Southern Lands, and King's son of Kush. Amenemopet is attested in texts on the road from Assuan to Philae, at Buhen, on the Sehel Island, in the temple at Beit el-Wali. and at Jebel Dosha.

Amenemopet followed in his father's footsteps and became Viceroy of Kush during the final years of Horemheb or the early years of Seti I.

He probably took part in a Nubian military campaign that pacified a rebellion in Irem during the reign of Seti.
