= Seti (commander) =

Ancient Egyptian Commander

Seti or Suti was an ancient Egyptian soldier during the late 18th Dynasty (14th century BCE), the commander of the army, later mentioned as vizier on monuments of his son, Paramessu, who would later go on to become pharaoh Ramesses I. Seti, the forefather of the 19th Dynasty, was from a military family in the Nile Delta. According to one theory he is identical with a royal envoy mentioned in the Amarna letters as Šuta.

According to another theory, he had a brother called Khaemwaset who is identical with the Royal Fanbearer and Chief of the Bowmen of Kush Khaemwaset. The latter is mentioned on a statue dating to Tutankhamun's reign. Khaemwaset's wife Taemwadjsy was mistress of the Harem of Amun and is probably the same Taemwadjsy who was sister to Amenhotep called Huy, Viceroy of Kush. This theory is based on a fragmented votive stela now in the Oriental Institute in Chicago (OI 11456). This fragment is 115 cm (45 in) wide and 65–70 cm (26–28 in) high, its upper part depicts a sitting male and female figure, but only the feet remained intact. Its lower part shows three persons in clothing influenced by the Amarna-style, flanked by Khaemwaset and Ramose. The stela's inscription is: “an offering to the ka of Osiris-Suti, Commander of the Troops of the Lord of the Two Lands”.
However, others have pointed out that the stela dates most likely under Amenhotep III and is therefore too early for this identification. The reading of the name Ramose (the future king Ramesses I as son of Seti), on this stela is very doubtful too and a reading Amenmose seems more likely.

Seti	Khaemwaset	Taemwadjsy♀	Amenhotep called Huy
"Ramose" or "Amenmose"
