= TT40 =

Theban tomb

Coordinates: 25.7333°N 32.6000°E

Theban tomb TT40
- Burial site of Amenhotep called Huy
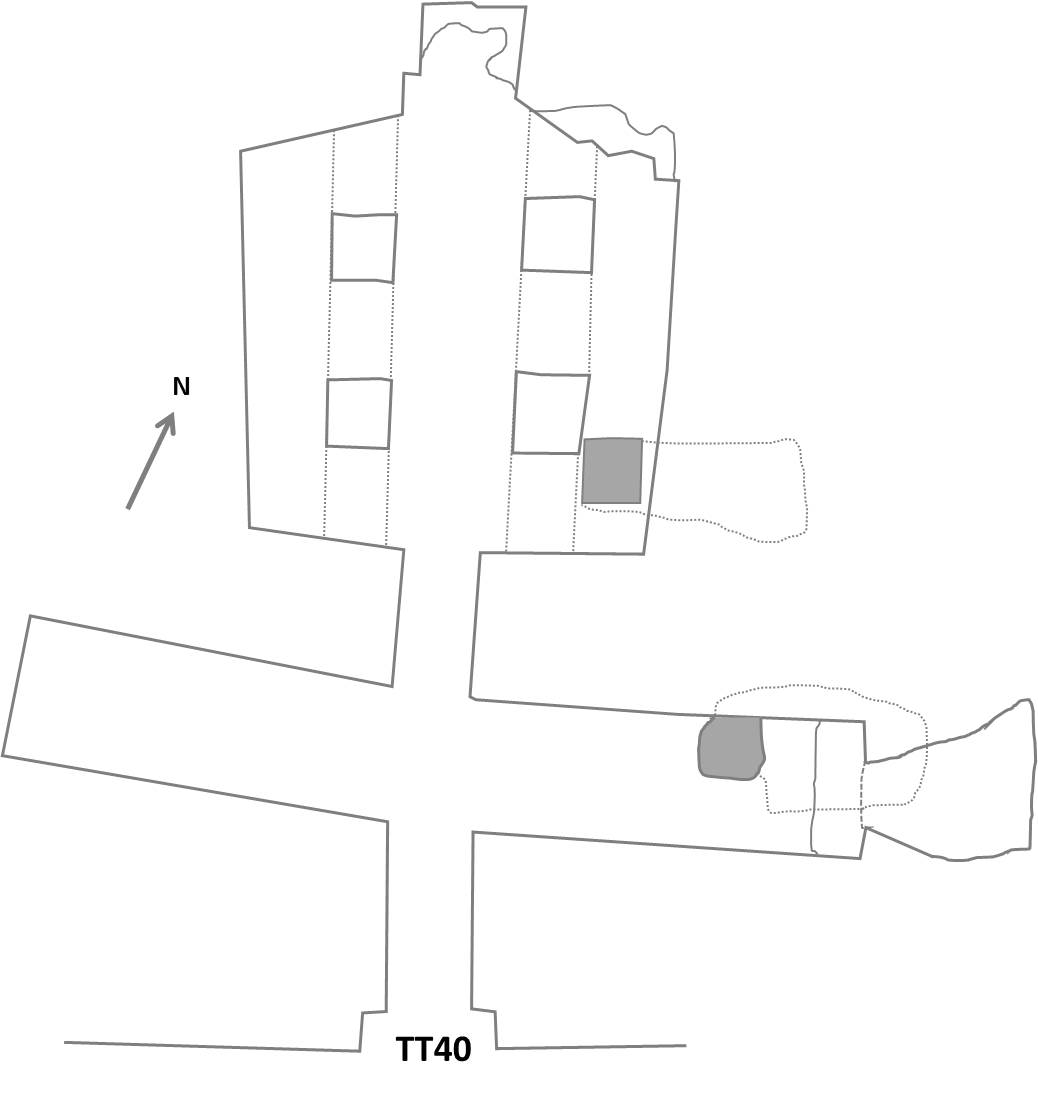
- Nubian tribute presented to the King

- Location within Egypt
- Location: Qurnet Murai, Theban Necropolis
- ← Previous; TT39 Next → TT41

i mn n Y1 t p called F18 Y1 i i
Amenhotep called Huy
in hieroglyphs
Era: New Kingdom
(1550–1069 BC)

The Theban Tomb TT40 is located in Qurnet Murai, part of the Theban Necropolis, on the west bank of the Nile, opposite to Luxor. It is the burial place of the ancient Egyptian Viceroy of Kush named Amenhotep called Huy, who lived during the end of the 18th Dynasty during the reign of Tutankhamun.

Huy was the son of a lady named Werner. His father is not known. Huy was married to Taemwadjsy, chief of the harem of Amun and of the Harem of Nebkheperure (Tutankhamun). They had a son named Paser.

== Tomb ==
In the tomb there is reference to a Temple named "Satisfying the Gods" in Nubia. Huy is shown being greeted there by Khay, High Priest of Nebkheperure (Tutankhamen), Penne, Deputy of the fortress of Nebkheperure (Tutankhamen), Huy, the Mayor, and Mermose, (his brother) the second prophet of Nebkheperure. Taemwadjsy was Chief of the Harem of Nebkheperure (Chief of the female attendants of the temple) at this temple. On one of the walls in the tomb chapel is depicted a Nubian delegation coming to Egypt. One of the officials named there is the chief of Miam Heqanefer, who is also known from his tomb in Nubia. Another official shown in the tomb and known from other sources is Paenniut. A complete and detailed description of the tomb is given on Osirisnet (see External Links).

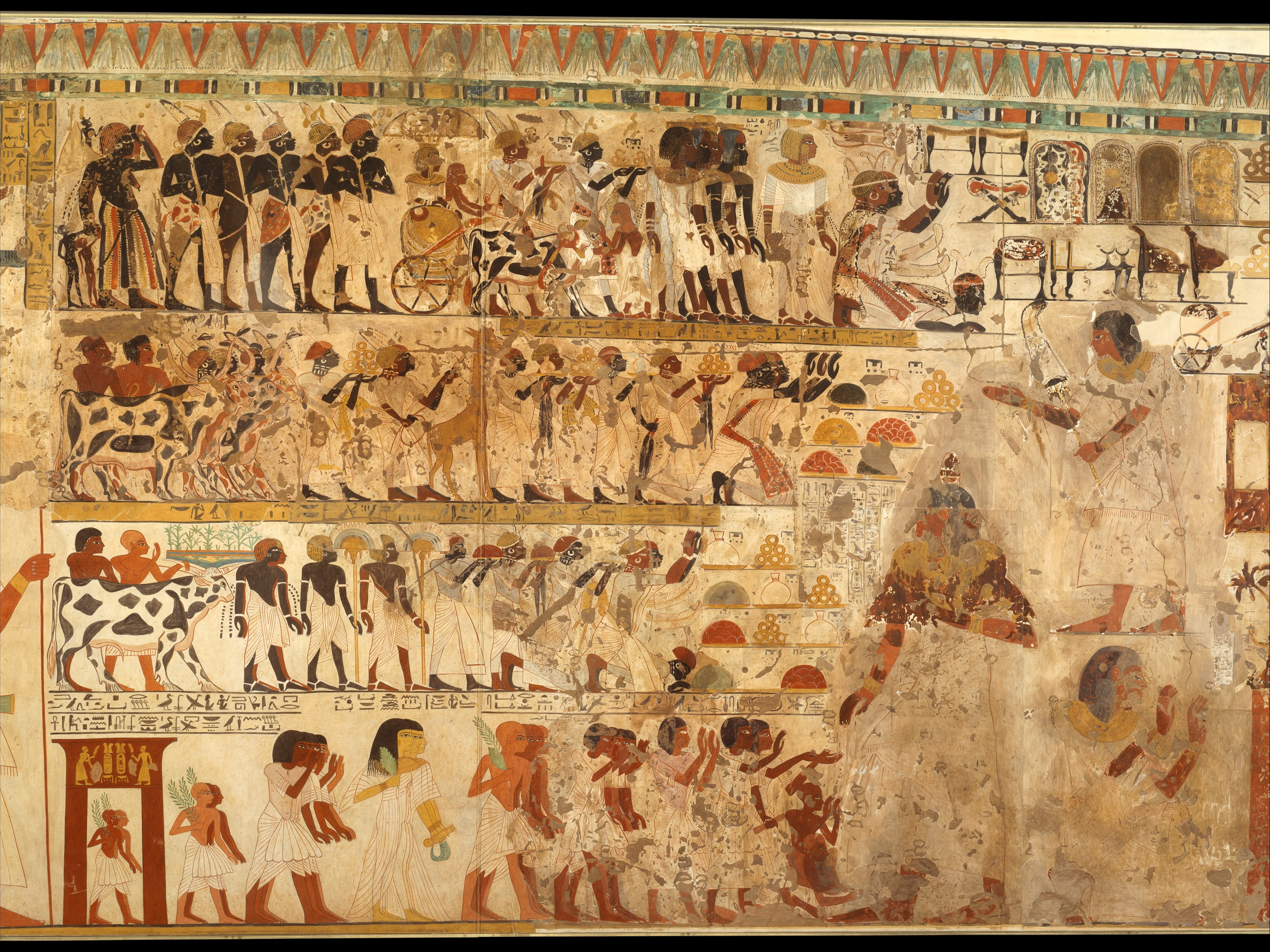
Nubian Tribute Presented to the King, Tomb of Huy MET DT221112

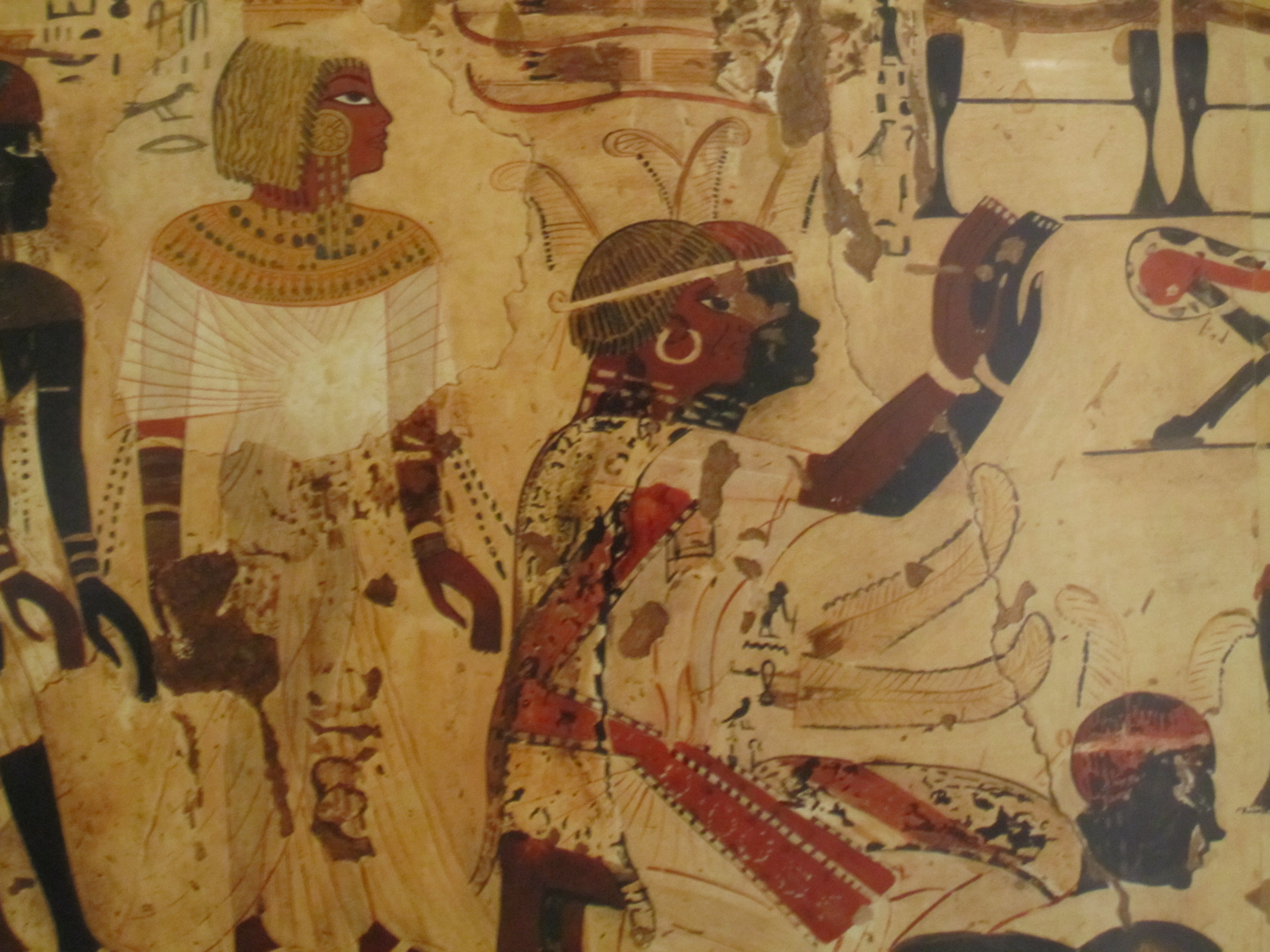
Nubian Prince Hekanefer bringing tribute for King Tut, 18th Dynasty, Tomb of Huy

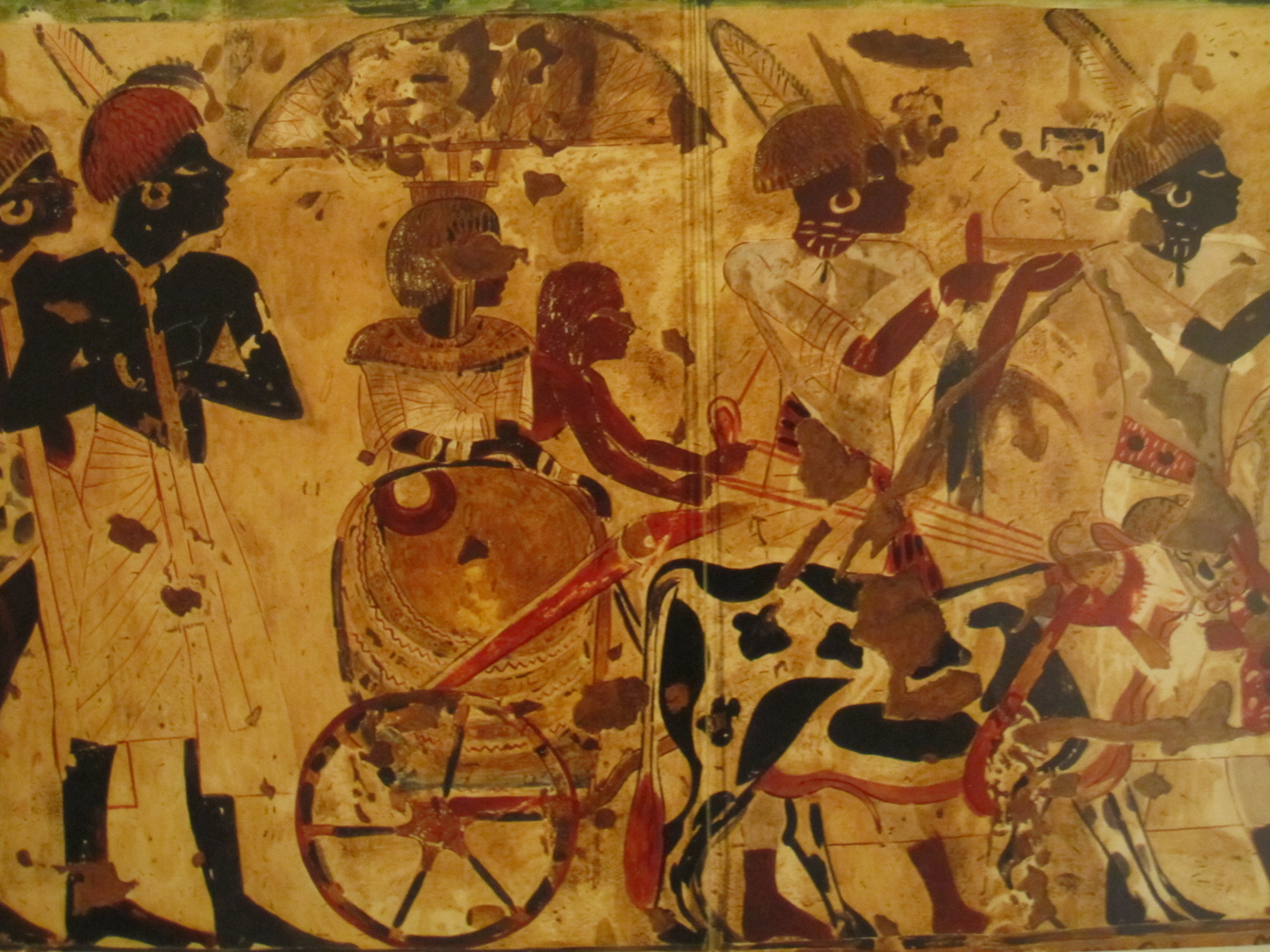
Nubians bringing tribute for King Tut, Tomb of Huy

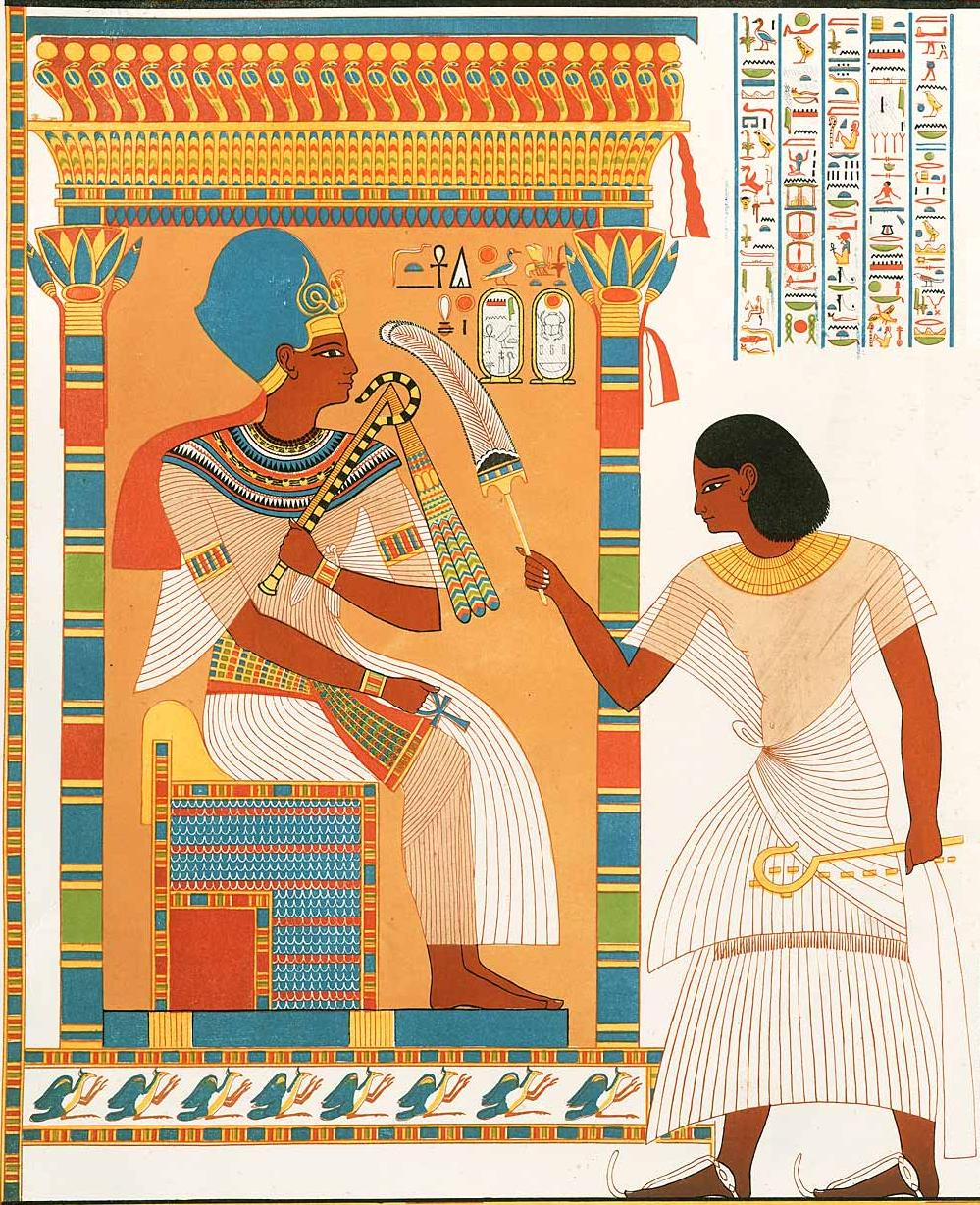
Huy before Tutankhamen

== See also ==
- List of Theban tombs
