= Heqanefer =

Ancient Egyptian official in Nubia

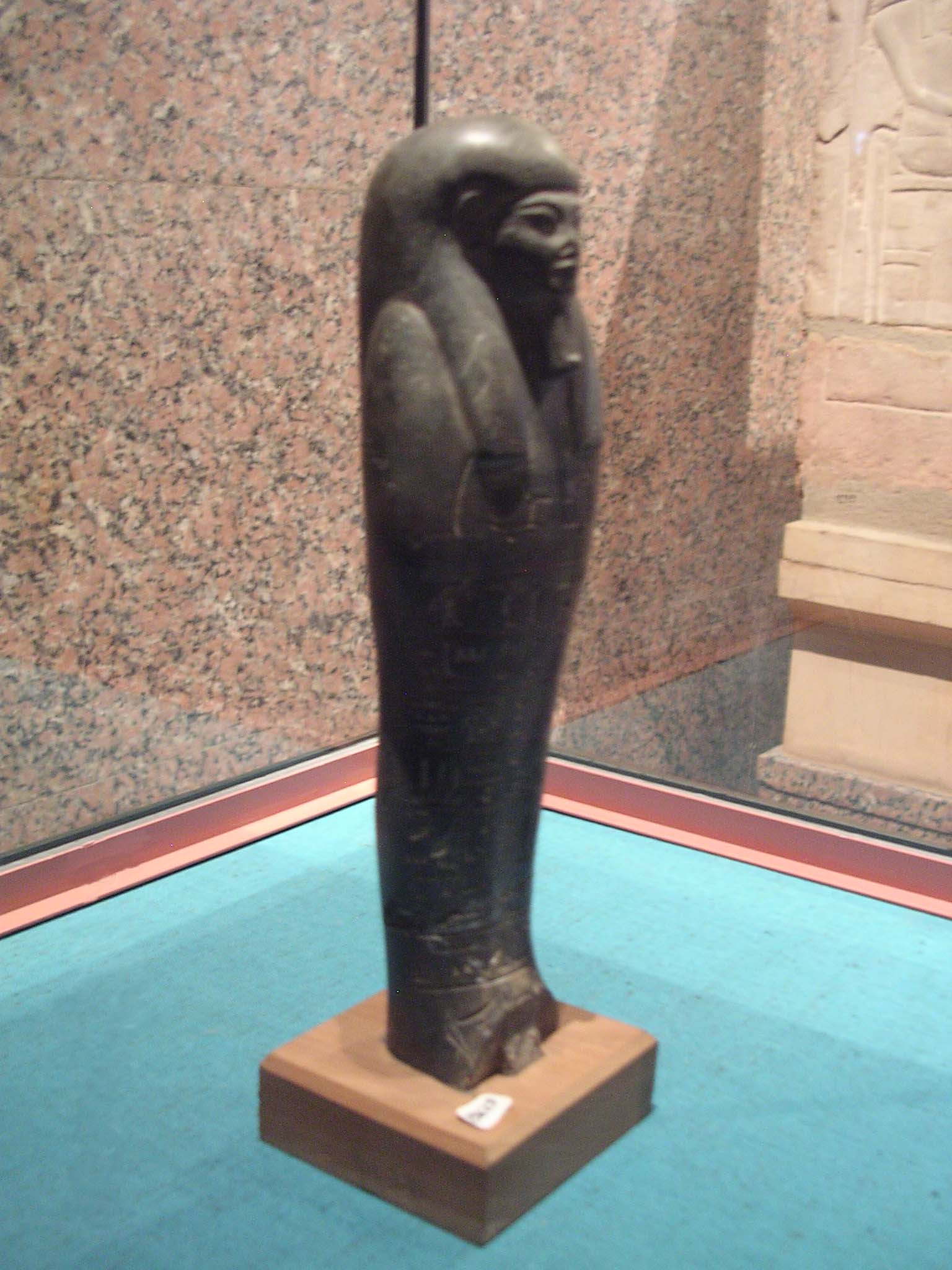
Ushabti of Heqanefer exhibited at the Nubian Museum of Aswan

Heqanefer (also Hekanefer) was an ancient Egyptian official in the New Kingdom under king Tutankhamun, who was a local governor with the title Chief of Miam (wr n miam). In the New Kingdom, Egyptian kings had conquered Lower Nubia. To secure control over the new region they appointed people of the local elite as governors. Miam (modern Aniba) was a town in Lower Nubia, a regional center and capital of the Nubian provinces. Here also resided the Chief of Miam. Heqanefer is known from his badly preserved rock cut tomb found at Toshka. Here he is depicted as Egyptian.

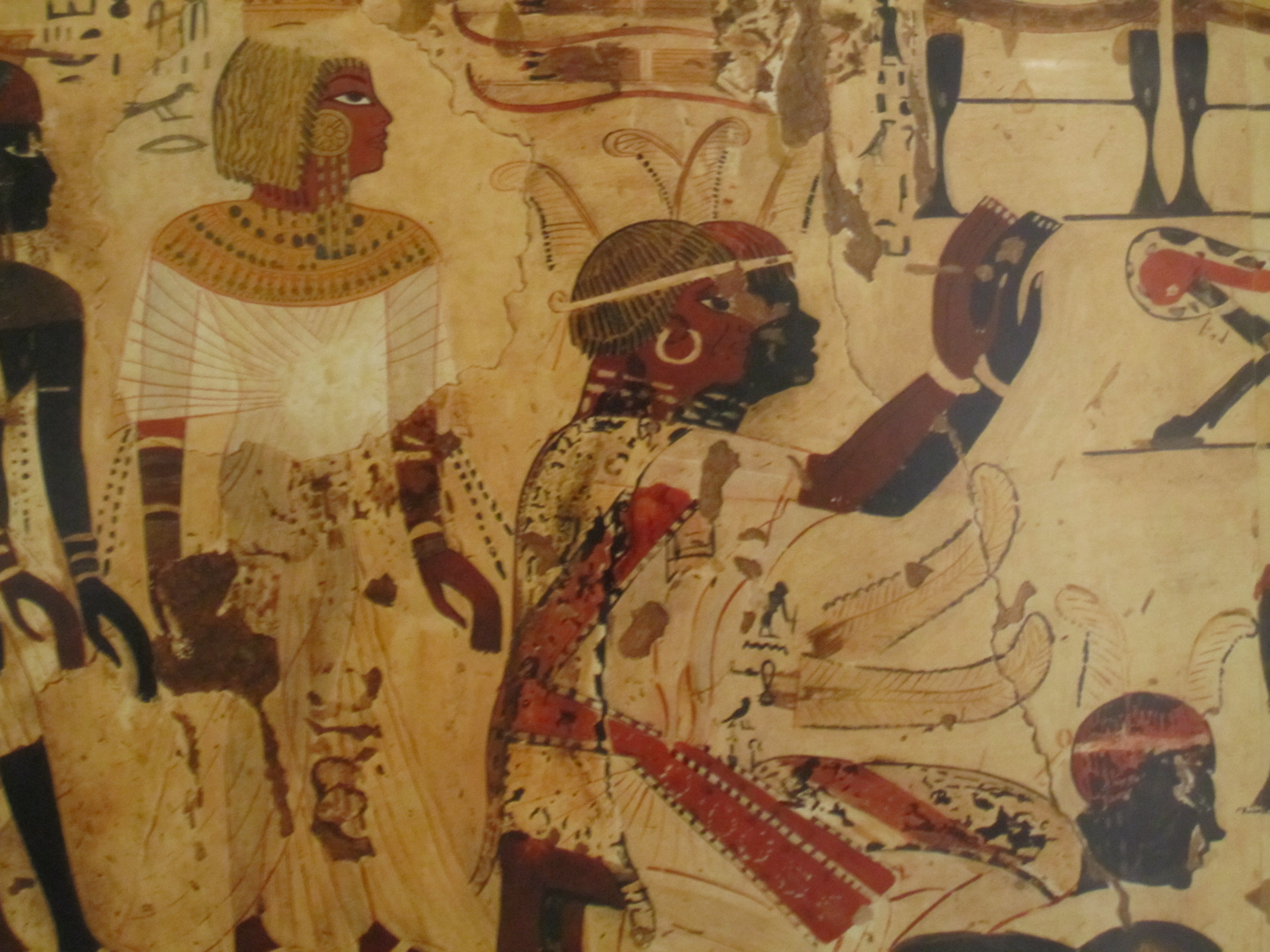
Nubian Prince Heqanefer bringing tribute for King Tutankhamun, 18th dynasty, Tomb of Huy. c. 1342 – c. 1325 BC

Heqanefer is also depicted in the tomb Viceroy of Kush Amenhotep called Huy (TT40). Here he appears in a Nubian delegation and is shown fully as dark skinned Nubian in Nubian costume. The viceroy of Kush was evidently the highest official in the Nubian provinces, while Heqanefer was in the hierarchy under him. Other Nubian officials are shown in the tomb too, but Heqanefer is the only one named, providing evidence that he was of special importance. The two totally different appearances of Heqanefer at home and in Egypt caused some discussion in Egyptology about local identities in Nubia.
