= Paser I =

Ancient Egyptian official, Viceroy of Kush

- Viceroy of Kush
- Predecessor: Amenhotep called Huy
- Successor: Amenemopet
- Dynasty: 18th Dynasty
- Pharaoh: Ay, Horemheb
- Father: Amenhotep called Huy
- Mother: Taemwadjsy
- Children: Amenemopet

Paser I was the Viceroy of Kush during the reigns of Ay and likely Horemheb. Reisner mentions that the only datable inscriptions for Paser belong to the reign of Ay. The next known Viceroy however is Amenemopet, who is dated to the reign of Seti I. Hence it's possible that Paser I served during the reigns of Ay, Horemheb (and maybe even Ramesses I?).

Paser was the son of the Viceroy Amenhotep called Huy, who served during the reign of Tutankhamun. His mother was the Lady Taemwadjsy.

Paser's titles include: Overseer of the Gold Lands of Amun, King's Son of Kush, overseer of the Southern Lands. Overseer of the Lands of Amun in Ta-Set, Overseer of the Gold Lands. King's scribe.

Paser I is attested in:

- Gebel es-Shems, a stela of Paser records his name and titles and a small chamber ("petit speos") is dedicated to Paser. The stela is dated to the reign of Ay.
- Sehel, an inscription mentioning Paser.
- The road from Assuan to Philae, an inscription of his son Amenemopet mentions Paser.
- A lintel from the temple of Aniba shows Paser adoring the cartouches of Horemheb.
