= Jebel Dosha =

Archaeological site in Sudan

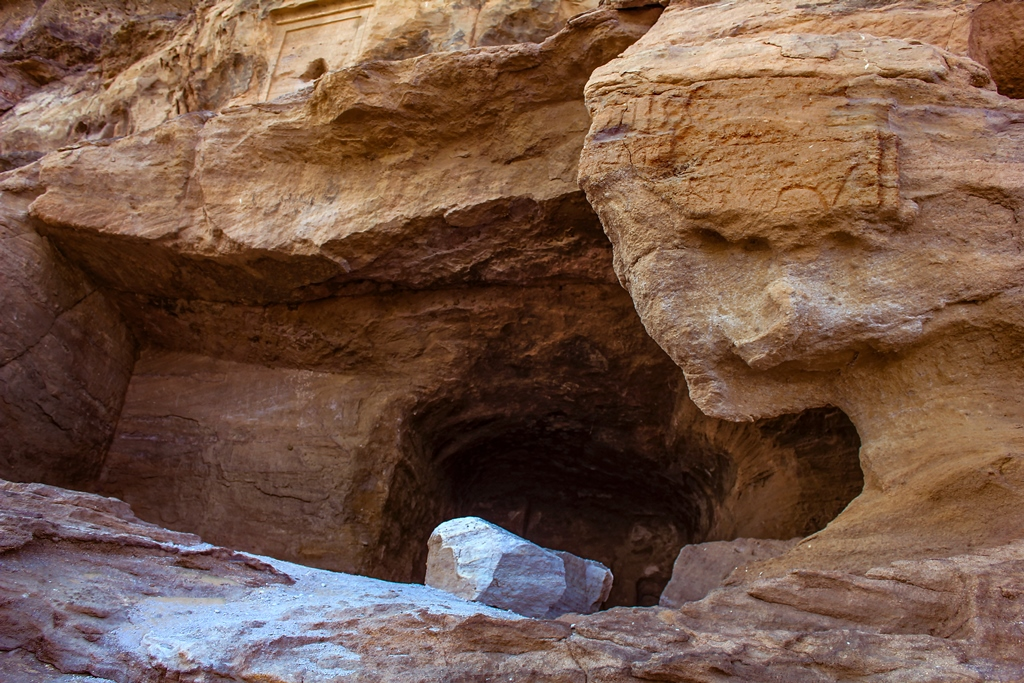
- Rock-chapel of Thutmose III with remains of decoration to right of entrance and, above to the left, stela of Seti I

- Location within Sudan
- 20°30′N 30°18′E
- Type: Sanctuary
- Location: Northern State, Sudan
- Region: Nubia

Jebel Dosha is a sandstone promontory right beside the Nile, on the western river bank between Soleb and Sedeinga in Northern State in Sudan. It features a rock-cut chapel of Thutmose III, similar to the contemporary Temple of Ellesyia as well as several stelae and rock inscriptions of New Kingdom date.

== The chapel ==
The rock-cut chapel, which overlooks the Nile, contains partly lost inscriptions and wall-decoration of Thutmose III. In the back wall of the chapel there are three largely disfigured seated statues.

== Rock inscriptions and stelae ==
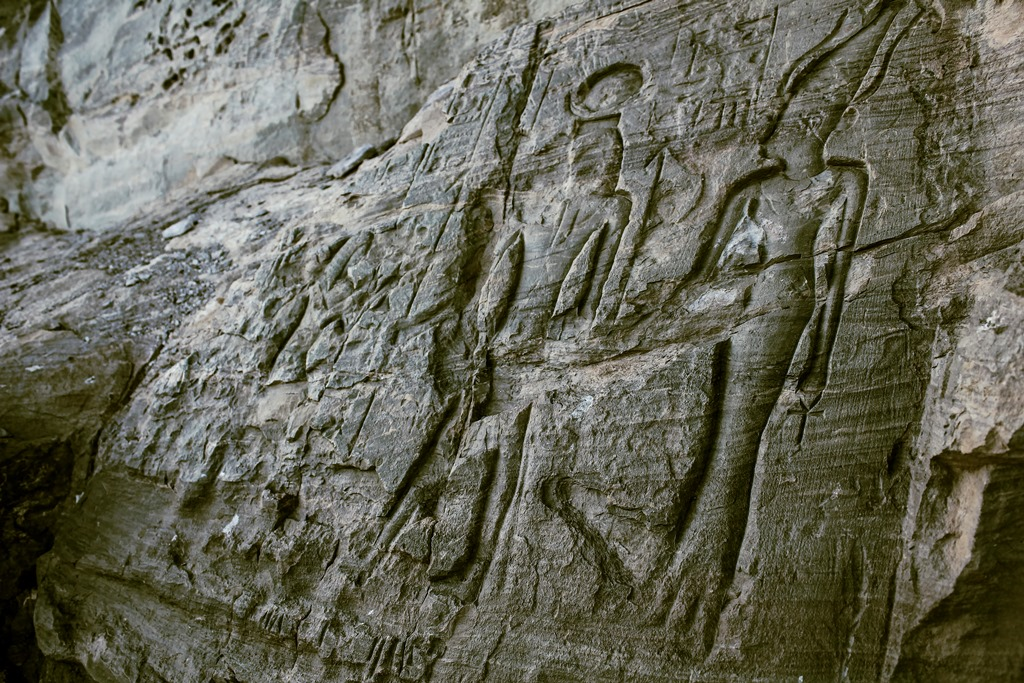
Sunk relief with Amenemopet, offering to a Lunar God and to Satet

In the early Ramesside period several stelae, mostly commissioned by the Viceroy of Kush Amenemopet, were added. One of the stelae shows Seti I making an offering to the gods Khnum, Satet and Anket; another, done in sunk relief, shows a kneeling Amenemopet offering to a lunar god and to the goddess Satet. Several groups of striding figures are carved into the jebel rock.
