= Ramesseum king list =

Ancient Egyptian King list

The memorial temple of Ramesses II, also called simply the Ramesseum, contains a minor list of pharaohs of ancient Egypt. The scene with the list was first published by Jean-Francois Champollion in 1845, and by Karl Richard Lepsius four years later.

The upper register of the second western pylon, shows a processions where ancestors of Ramesses II are honored at ceremonies of the festival of Min. It contains 19 cartouches with the names of 14 pharaohs, listing less pharaohs than his kings list in Abydos. Notably, Hatshepsut and the Amarna pharaohs are omitted.

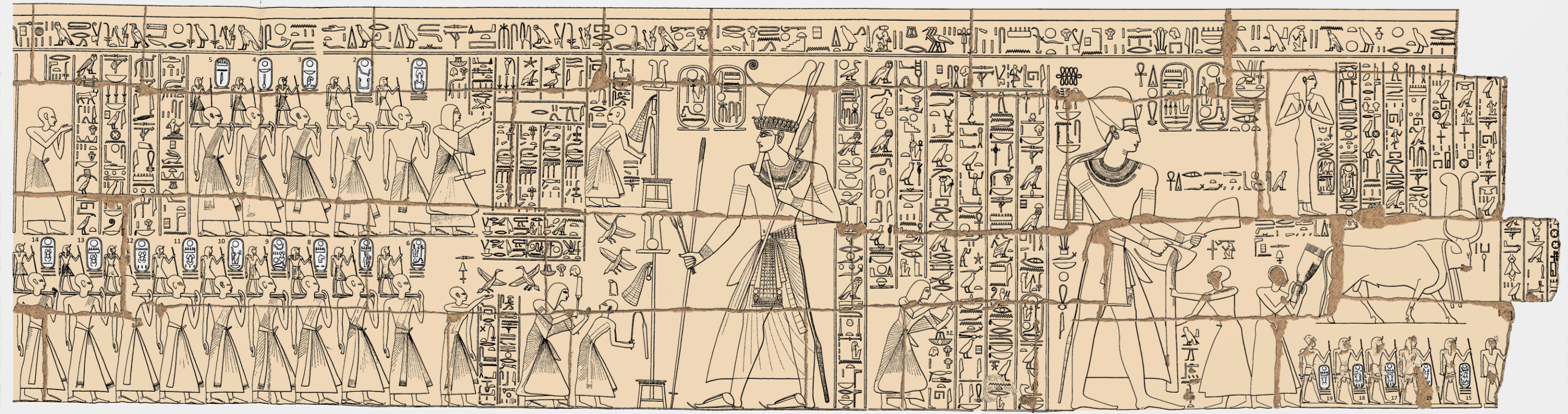
Drawing of the Ramesseum King list of Ramesses II

== Kings names mentioned ==
The scene is divided in two parts, one with 14 statues of the ancestral kings being carried in a procession on the left side. The second part is a procession led by six kings, but only the name of five remain.

Top left procession
#	Pharaoh	Inscription (throne name)	Hieroglyphs
1.	Thutmose I	Aakheperkare	< ra aA xpr kA > mAa T1
2.	Amenhotep I	Djeserkare	< ra Dsr kA > mAa T1
3.	Ahmose I	Nebpehtyre	< ra nb F9 t t >
4.	Mentuhotep II	Nebhepetre	< ra nb xrw >
5.	Menes	Meni	< mn n i >

Bottom left procession
#	Pharaoh	Inscription (throne name)	Hieroglyphs
6.	Ramesses II	Usermaatre-setepenre	< ra wsr mAat stp ra n > mAa T1
7.	Seti I	Menmaatre	< ra mn mAat > mAa T1
8.	Ramesses I	Menpehtyre	< ra mn F9 t t > mAa T1
9.	Horemheb	Djeserkheperure-setepenre	< ra Dsr xpr Z2 ra stp n > mAa T1
10.	Amenhotep III	Nebmaatre	< ra mAat nb > mAa T1
11.	Thutmose IV	Menkheperure	< ra mn xpr Z2 > mAa T1
12.	Amenhotep II	Aakheperure	< ra aA xpr Z2 > mAa T1
13.	Thutmose III	Menkheperre	< ra mn xpr > mAa T1
14.	Thutmose II	Aakheperenre	< ra aA xpr n > mAa T1

Right procession
#	Pharaoh	Inscription (throne name)	Hieroglyphs
15.	Horemheb	Djeserkheperure-setepenre	< ra Dsr xpr Z2 ra stp n > mAa T1
16.	Amenhotep III	Nebmaatre	< ra mAat nb > mAa T1
17.	Thutmose IV	Menkheperure	< ra mn xpr Z2 > mAa T1
18.	Amenhotep II	Aakheperure	< ra aA xpr Z2 > mAa T1
19.	Thutmose III	Menkheperre	< ra mn xpr > mAa T1

The scene remains in situ in the upper register of the second western pylon. The later Medinet Habu king list of Ramesses III is very similar in design, but only lists nine pharaohs.

== See also ==
- Abydos King List (Seti I)
- Abydos King List (Ramesses II)
- Manetho King List
- Karnak King List
- Palermo Stone
- Saqqara Tablet
- Turin King List
- Medinet Habu king list

== Bibliography ==
- Jean François Champollion: Monuments de l'Égypte et de la Nubie, II, plates 149bis-150 (Paris: 1845)
- Carl Richard Lepsius: Denkmaeler aus Aegypten und Aethiopien, III, plate 163, (Berlin: 1849)
- The Epigraphic Survey: Medinet Habu: Volume IV, OIP 51, Plate 213 (Chicago: 1940)
- Kenneth A. Kitchen: Ramesside Inscriptions, Vol V, pp. 205:9-11; 209:9-10 (Oxford: 1983)
