= Nineteenth Dynasty of Egypt =

Egyptian dynasty from 1295 to 1186 BC

- 1292 BC–1188 BC
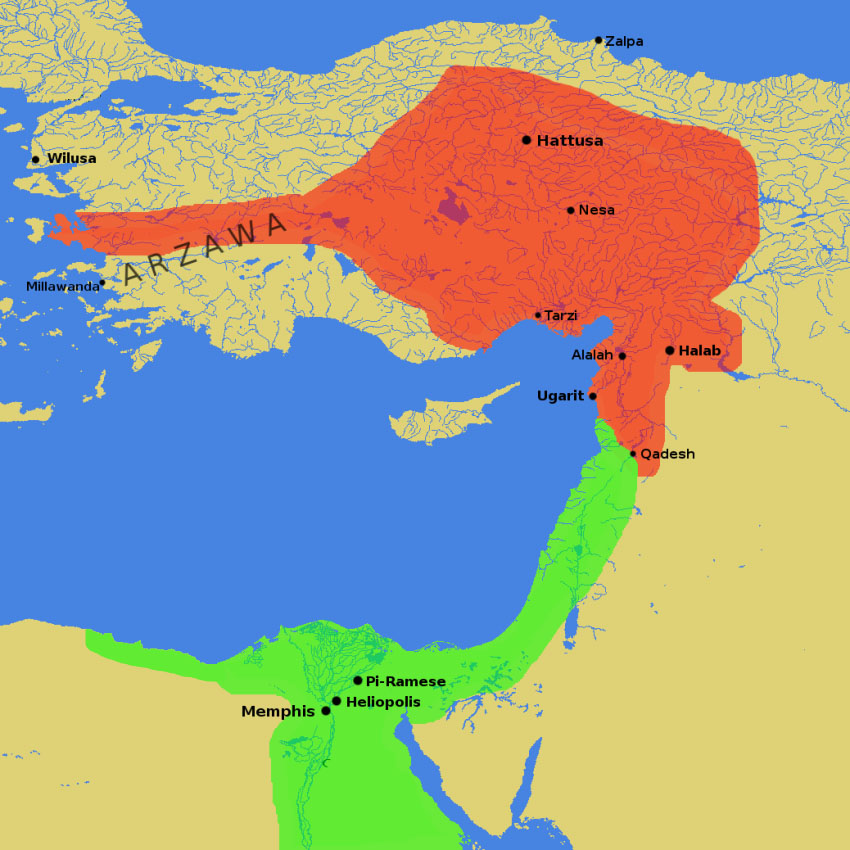
- Egypt and the Hittite Empire around the time of the Battle of Kadesh (1274 BC)
- Capital: Thebes, later Memphis and Pi-Ramesses
- Common languages: Egyptian language
- Religion: Ancient Egyptian Religion
- Government: Absolute monarchy
- Pharaoh
  - c. 1292–1290 BC: Ramesses I (first)
  - c. 1290-1279 BC: Seti I (second)
  - c. 1279–1213 BC: Ramesses II (third, most well-known)
  - c. 1191–1188 BC: Twosret (last)
- Historical era: New Kingdom of Egypt
  - Established: 1292 BC
  - Disestablished: 1188 BC
Preceded by	Succeeded by
Eighteenth Dynasty of Egypt	Twentieth Dynasty of Egypt

The Nineteenth Dynasty of Egypt (notated Dynasty XIX), also known as the Ramessid dynasty, is classified as the second dynasty of the Ancient Egyptian New Kingdom period, lasting from 1292 BC to 1189 BC. The 19th Dynasty and the 20th Dynasty furthermore together constitute an era known as the Ramesside period. This dynasty was founded by Vizier Ramesses I, whom Pharaoh Horemheb chose as his successor to the throne.

== History ==
=== Background ===
The warrior kings of the early 18th Dynasty had encountered only little resistance from neighbouring kingdoms, allowing them to expand their realm of influence easily, but the international situation had changed radically towards the end of the dynasty. The Hittites had gradually extended their influence into Syria and Canaan to become a major power in international politics, a power that both Seti I and his son Ramesses II would confront in the future.

=== 19th Dynasty ===
==== Seti I and Ramesses II ====
The New Kingdom of Egypt reached the zenith of its power under Seti I and Ramesses II ("The Great"), who campaigned vigorously against the Libyans and the Hittites. The city of Kadesh was first captured by Seti I, who decided to concede it to Muwatalli of Hatti in an informal peace treaty between Egypt and Hatti. Ramesses II later attempted unsuccessfully to alter this situation in his fifth regnal year by launching an attack on Kadesh in his Second Syrian campaign in 1274 BC; he was caught in history's first recorded military ambush, but thanks to the arrival of the Ne'arin (a force allied with Egypt), Ramesses was able to rally his troops and turn the tide of battle against the Hittites. Ramesses II later profited from the Hittites' internal difficulties, during his eighth and ninth regnal years, when he campaigned against their Syrian possessions, capturing Kadesh and portions of Southern Syria, and advancing as far north as Tunip, where no Egyptian soldier had been seen for 120 years. He ultimately accepted that a campaign against the Hittites was an unsupportable drain on Egypt's treasury and military. In his 21st regnal year, Ramesses signed the earliest recorded peace treaty with Urhi-Teshub's successor, Hattusili III, and with that act Egypt-Hittite relations improved significantly. Ramesses II even married two Hittite princesses, the first after his second Sed Festival.

==== Merneptah and successors ====
This dynasty declined as infighting for the throne between the heirs of Merneptah increased. Amenmesse apparently usurped the throne from Merneptah's son and successor, Seti II, but he ruled Egypt for only four years. After his death, Seti regained power and destroyed most of Amenmesse's monuments. Seti was served at court by Chancellor Bay, who was originally just a 'royal scribe' but quickly became one of the most powerful men in Egypt, gaining the unprecedented privilege of constructing his own tomb in the Valley of the Kings (KV13). Both Bay and Seti's chief wife, Twosret, had a sinister reputation in Ancient Egyptian folklore. After Siptah's death, Twosret ruled Egypt for two more years, but she proved unable to maintain her hold on power amid the conspiracies and powerplays being hatched at the royal court. She was likely ousted in a revolt led by Setnakhte, founder of the 20th Dynasty.

== Pharaohs of the 19th Dynasty ==
The pharaohs of the 19th Dynasty ruled for approximately 110 years: from c. 1292 to 1187 BC. Many of the pharaohs were buried in the Valley of the Kings in Thebes (designated KV). Royal brother-sister marriages were observed, as a means to strengthen the royalty by echoing the practices in their creation myths. More information can be found on the Theban Mapping Project website.

Dynasty XIX Kings of Egypt
Pharaoh	Image	Prenomen (Throne name)	Horus-name	Reign	Burial	Consort(s)
Ramesses I		Menpehtyre	Kanakhtwadjnesyt	1292–1290 BC	KV16	Sitre
Seti I		Menmaatre	Kanakhtkhaem Wasetsankhtawy	1290–1279 BC	KV17	(Mut-)Tuya
Ramesses II		Usermaatre Setepenre	Kanakhtmerymaat	1279–1213 BC	KV7	Nefertari; Isetnofret; Maathorneferure; Meritamen; Bintanath; Nebettawy; Henutmire
Merneptah		Baenre Merynetjeru	Kanakhthaemmaat	1213–1203 BC	KV8	Isetnofret II; Takhat?
Seti II		Userkheperure Setepenre	Kanakhtwerpehty	1203–1197 BC	KV15	Takhat? Twosret? Tiaa
Amenmesse		Menmire Setepenre	Kanakhtmery Maatsementawy	1201–1198 BC	KV10	Tiye or Tiy?
Siptah		Sekhaienre Meryamun (originally); Akhenre Setepenre (later)	Kanakhtmeryhapy Sankhtanebemkaef	1197–1191 BC	KV47	Unknown
Tausret		Sitre Meryamun	Kanakhtmerymaat	1191–1188 BC	KV14	Seti II (Before Reign)

== Comparison of regnal lists ==
Although the Nineteenth Dynasty is well-recorded, they aren't fully featured in many Egyptian king lists, mostly due to the surviving ones being written by the early Nineteenth Dynasty pharaohs. The Abydos king list was finished during the reign of Seti I while the Fragmentary Abydos, Saqqara and Ramesseum king lists were finished during the reign Ramesses II, and so don't record the later pharaohs.

The only 2 surviving king lists that fully feature the Nineteenth Dynasty are the Medinet Habu king list from the time of Ramesses III of the Twentieth Dynasty, and Manetho, who lived during the Ptolemaic Kingdom. The Medinet Habu king list omits Amenmesse, Siptah and Twosret as a form of damnatio memoriae by the Twentieth Dynasty pharaohs. Manetho's now-lost work Aegyptiaca also provided individual reign lengths, however the lengths seem to be inaccurate and later Epitomes of the work were misunderstood by various writers who conflated multiple kings into a single figure, failed to understand the number of kings in this dynasty.

Historical Pharaoh	Abydos King List	Fragmentary Abydos King List	Saqqara King List	Ramesseum King List	Medinet Habu King List	Manetho
Ramesses I	Menpehtire	Menpehtire	Menpehtire	Menpehtyre	Menpehtyre	Ramesses
Seti I	Menmaatre	Menmaatre	Menmaatre	Menmaatre	Menmaatre	Sethos
Ramesses II		Usermaatre	Usermaatre setepenre	Usermaatre setepenre	Usermaatre setepenre	Armesses Miamun
Merneptah					Baenre meryamun	Ammenemes
Seti II					Userkheperure setepenre	Thouoris
Amenmesse					Omitted	Omitted
Siptah					Omitted	Omitted
Twosret					Omitted	Alkandra

== Gallery of images ==
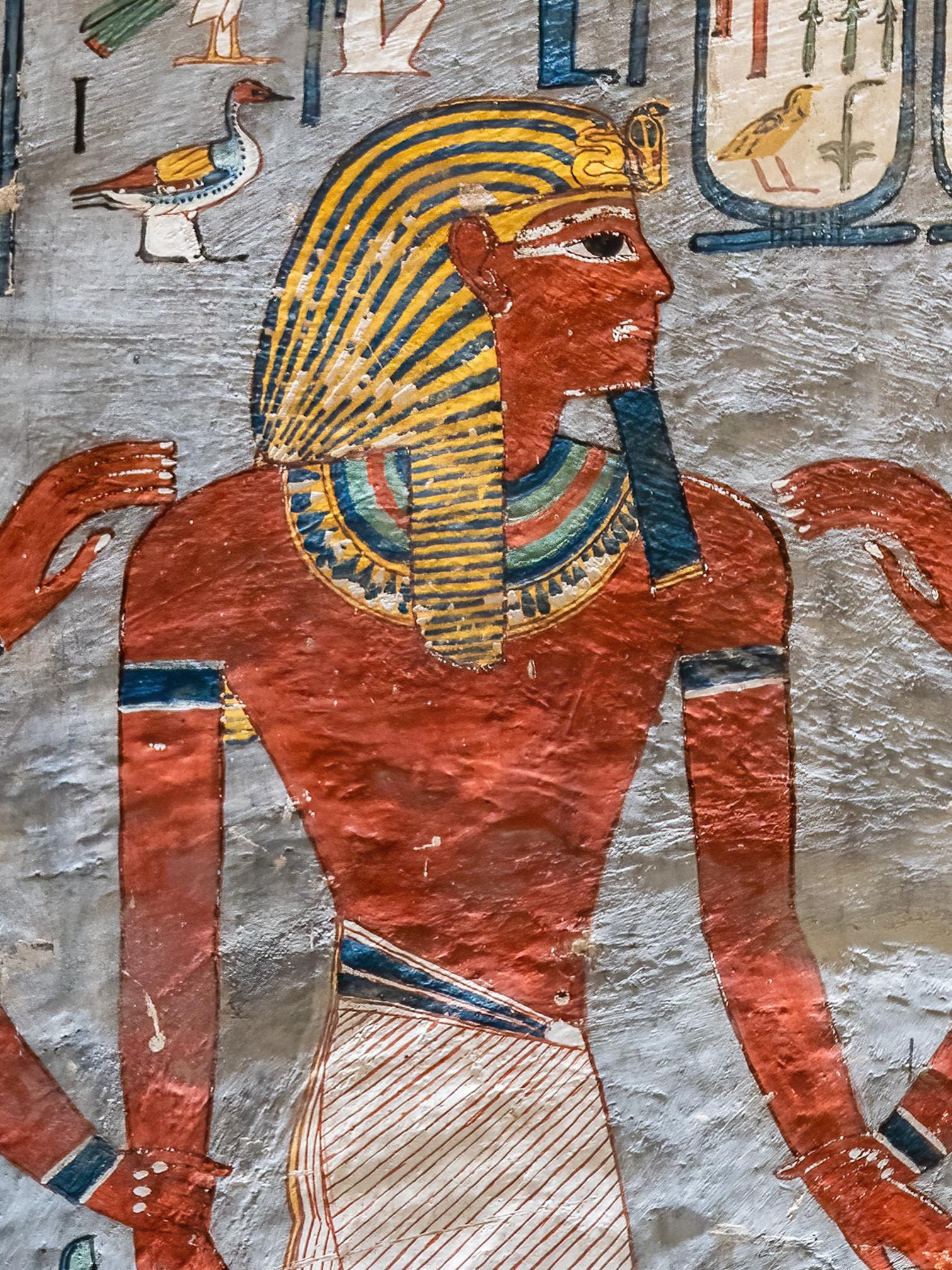
Ramesses I

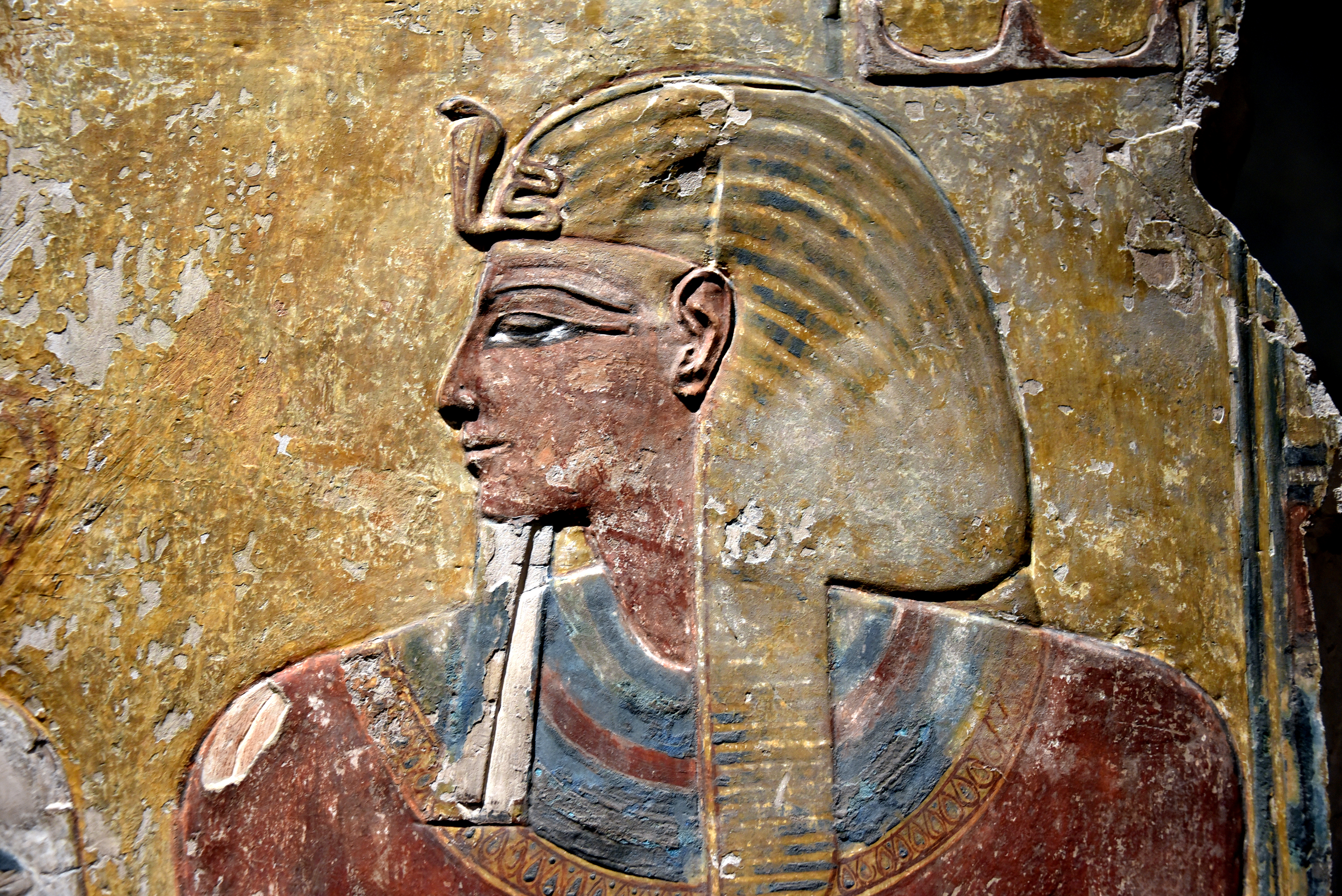
Seti I

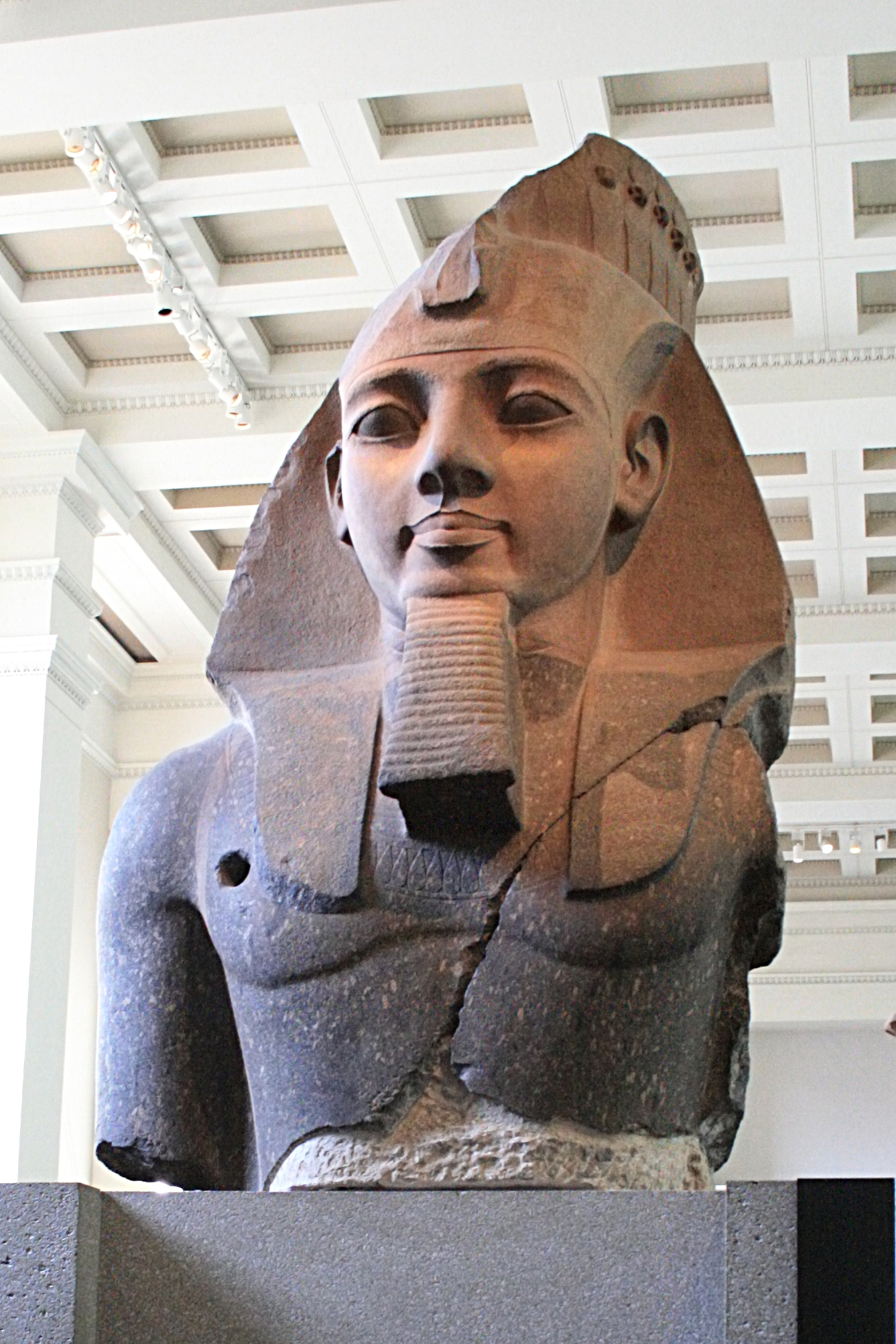
Ramesses II

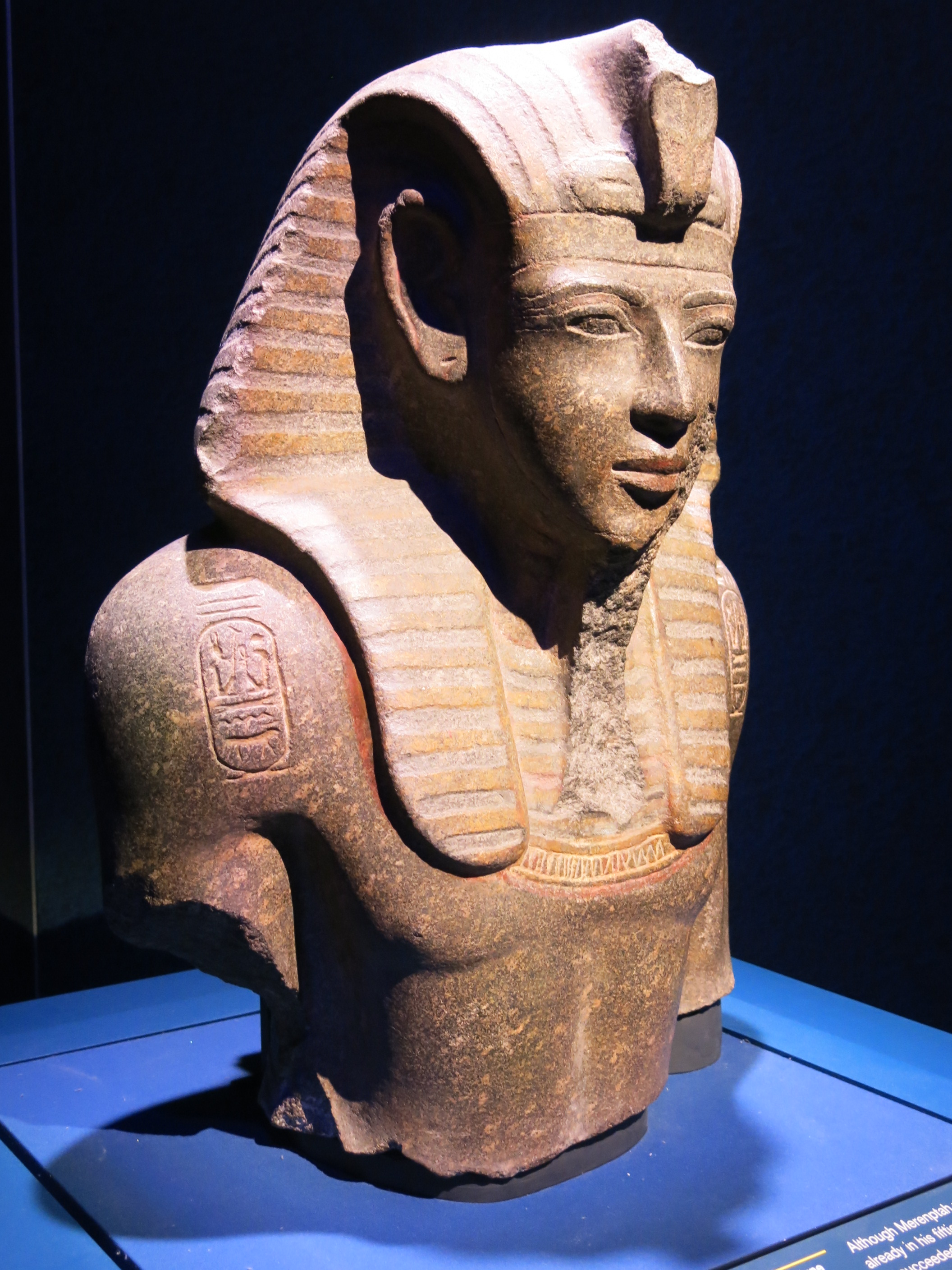
Merneptah

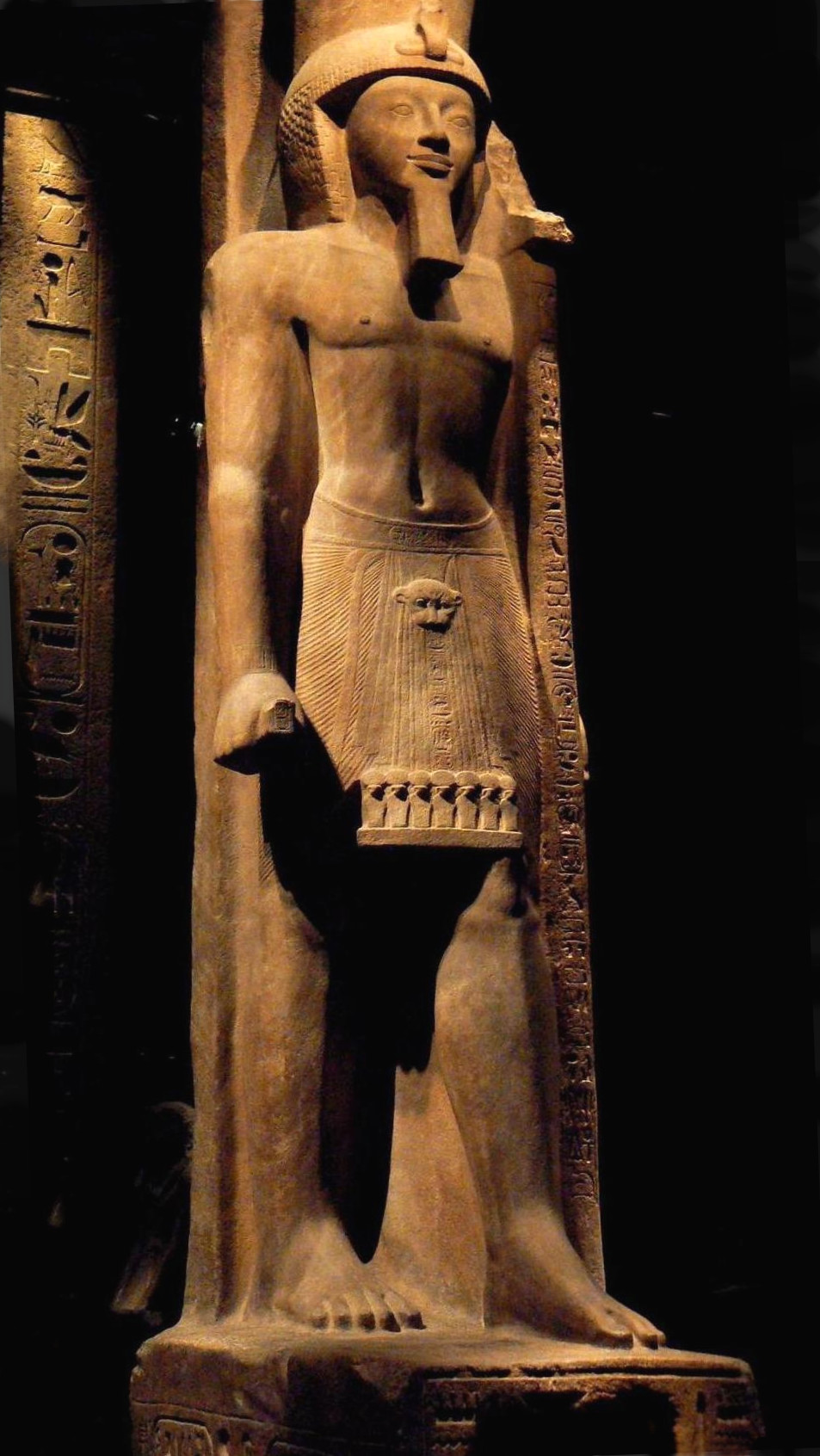
Seti II

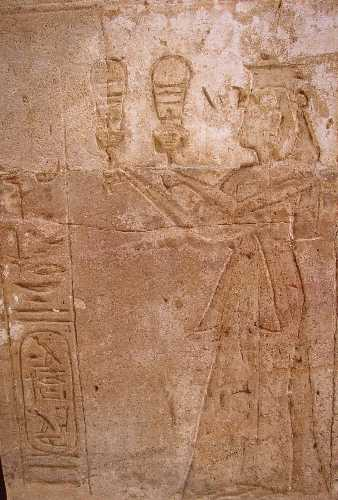
Twosret

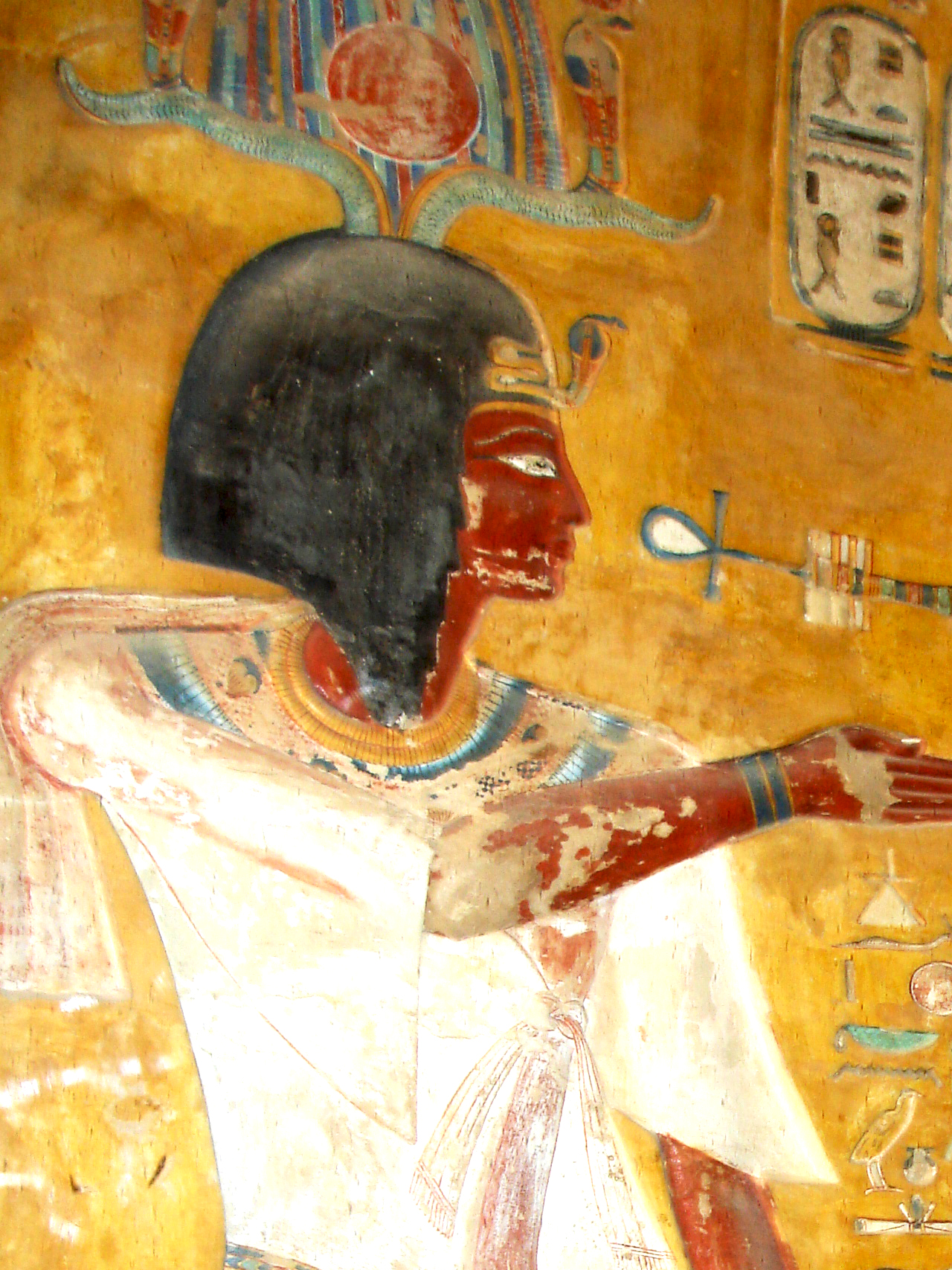
Siptah

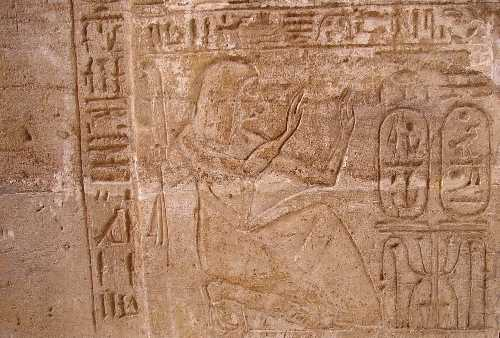
Chancellor Bay

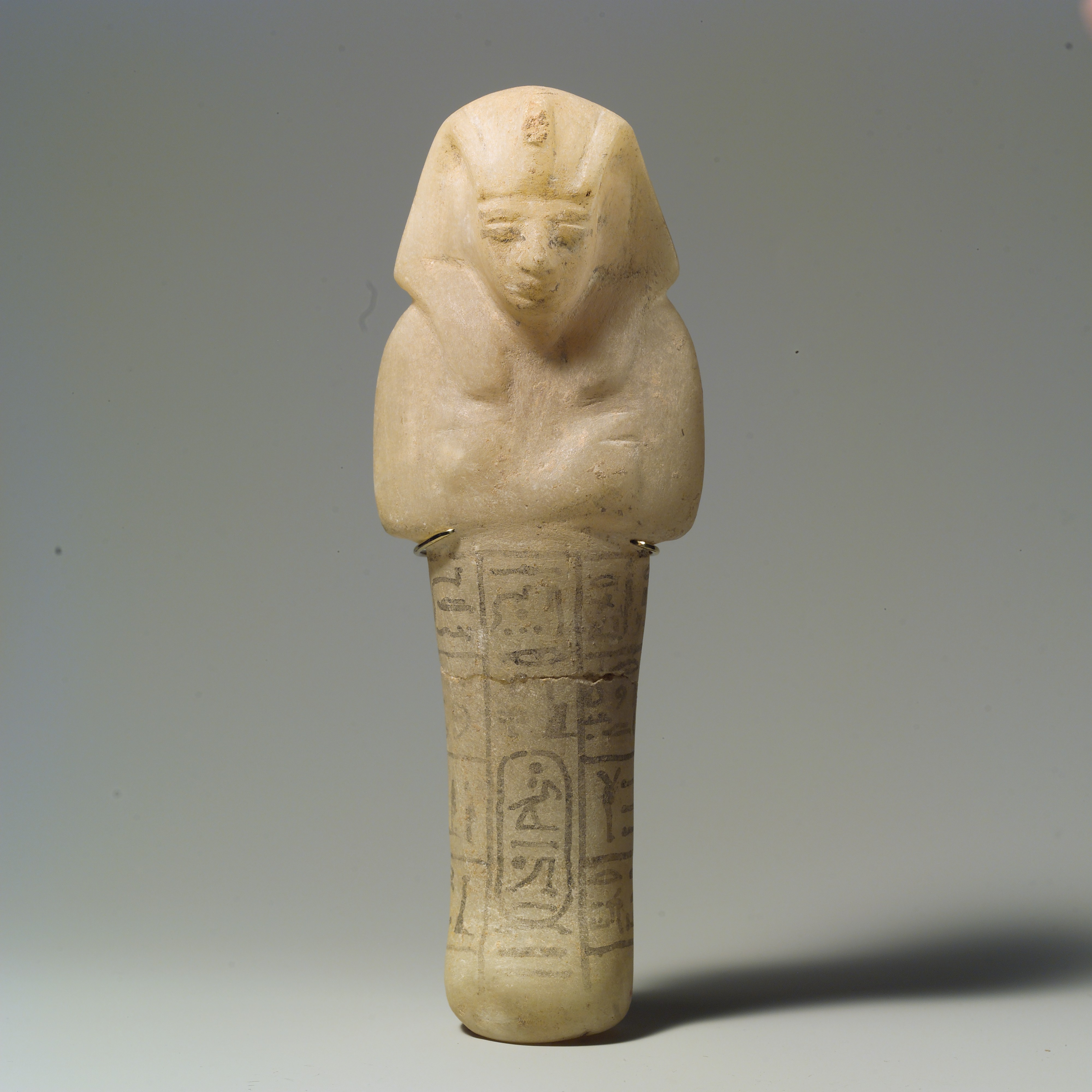
Shabti of Siptah

== See also ==
- Egyptian chronology
- Nineteenth Dynasty of Egypt family tree
  - List of children of Ramesses II
- Ka-Nefer-Nefer

== Bibliography ==
- Dodson, A., Poisoned Legacy: The Fall of the Nineteenth Egyptian Dynasty, AUC Press, 2010
- Dodson, A., Sethy I, King of Egypt: His Life and Afterlife, AUC Press, 2019

Preceded by Eighteenth Dynasty	Dynasties of Egypt c. 1292 BC–1188 BC	Succeeded by Twentieth Dynasty
