= Paenniut =

Paenniut (the one from the town) was an important Ancient Egyptian official in charge during the reign of Tutankhamun. He is depicted in tomb TT40 that belongs to the viceroy of Kush Amenhotep called Huy and is also known from a stela found in the Kurkur Oasis. In the tomb of Amenhotep/Huy he bears the title deputy of the fortress of Faras. On the stela he bears several titles, including overseer of the double granary, and governor in Dwatnefert. The most important title was however deputy of Wawat. Wawat was the Egyptian word for Lower Nubia and was with this position, Paenniut was one of the most important officials in charge of this province that was in this time under Egyptian control.
