= Medinet Habu king list =

Ancient Egyptian King list

The memorial temple of Ramesses III (Mortuary Temple of Ramesses III) at Medinet Habu contains a minor list of pharaohs of the New Kingdom of Egypt. The inscriptions closely resemble the Ramesseum king list, which is a similar scene of Ramesses II, which was used as a template for the scenes here.

The scene shows Ramesses III participating in the ceremonies of the Festival of Min where statues of ancestral kings are carried in an elaborate procession to make offerings to Min. It contains 16 cartouches with the names of nine pharaohs divided into two parts.

The sparse outline of the scene was published by Vivant Denon in 1802, who was part of Napoleon's expedition to Egypt in 1798 to 1801, which published a slightly more detailed scene in 1809. Thirty years later, the complete scene including the cartouches of the kings was published by John Gardner Wilkinson in 1837, followed by Champollion and Lepsius. All the 19th-century editions contain omissions and errors, but in 1940 the Epigraphic Survey published the definitive (and complete) rendering of the scenes.

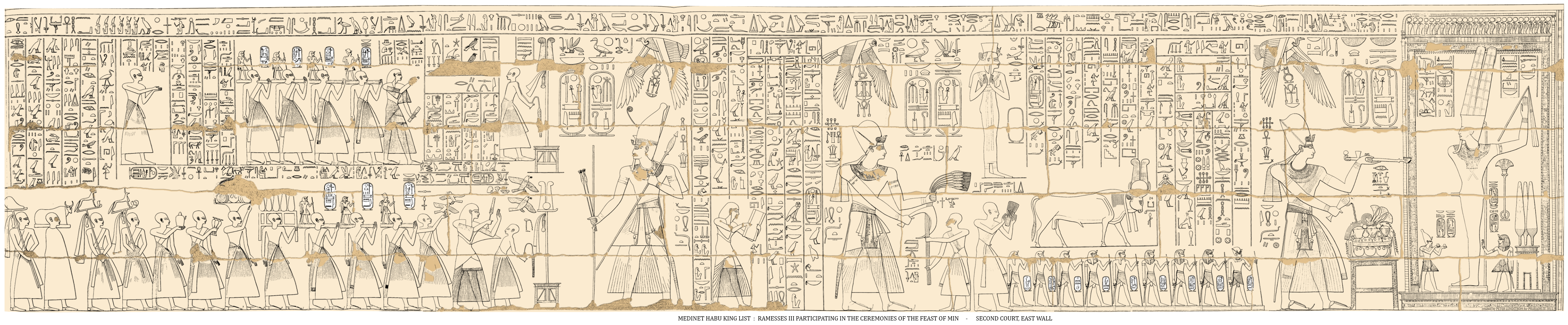
Medinet Habu king list (Epigraphic Survey)

== Kings names mentioned ==
The scene is divided in two parts, on the left side, 7 statues of ancestors are being carried in a procession. The right side is led by nine kings.

The rulers mentioned in the list
Top left procession
#	Pharaoh	Inscription (throne name)	Hieroglyphs
1.	Ramesses III	Usermaatre-meryamun	nb tA tA < ra wsr mAat N36 i mn n >
2.	Setnakhte	Userkhaure-meryamun	< ra wsr xa Z2 N36 i mn n >
3.	Ramesses II	Usermaatre-setepenre	< ra wsr mAat stp ra n >
4.	Merneptah	Baenre-meryamun	< C2 C12 N36 E11 >

Bottom left procession
#	Pharaoh	Inscription (throne name)	Hieroglyphs
5.	Ramesses III	Usermaatre-meryamun	nb tA tA < ra wsr mAat N36 i mn n >
6.	Setnakhte	Userkhaure-meryamun	< ra wsr xa Z2 N36 i mn n >
7.	Seti II	Userkheperure-meryamun	< ra wsr xpr Z2 N36 i mn n >

Right procession
#	Pharaoh	Inscription (throne name)	Hieroglyphs
8.	Ramesses III	Usermaatre-meryamun	< ra wsr mAat N36 i mn n >
9.	Setnakhte	Userkhaure-meryamun	< ra wsr xa Z2 N36 i mn n >
10.	Seti II	Userkheperure-meryamun	< ra wsr xpr Z2 N36 i mn n >
11.	Merneptah	Baenre-meryamun	< C2 C12 N36 E11 >
12.	Ramesses II	Usermaatre-setepenre	< ra wsr mAat stp ra n >
13.	Seti I	Menmaatre	< ra mAat mn n >
14.	Ramesses I	Menpehtyre	< ra mn n F9 >
15.	Horemheb	Djeserkheperure-setepenre	< ra Dsr xpr Z2 ra stp n >
16.	Amenhotep III	Nebmaatre	< ra mAat nb >

It remains in situ on the eastern second pylon in the second court, in the upper register on the eastern wall. It's also seen by some as an addition to the Abydos King List, as the Medinet Habu list contains some Rammasside pharaohs who reigned after the Abydos list was made.

== See also ==
- Abydos King List (Seti I)
- Abydos King List (Ramesses II)
- Manetho King List
- Karnak King List
- Palermo Stone
- Saqqara Tablet
- Turin King List
- Ramesseum king list
