= KV16 =

Ancient Egyptian tomb in the Valley of the Kings

- Burial site of Ramesses I
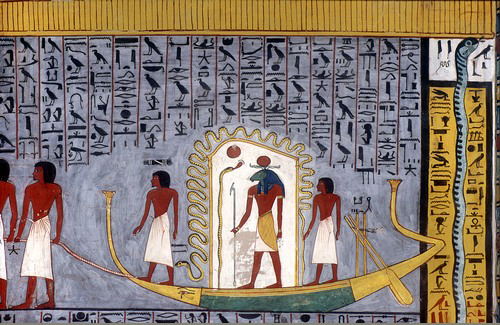

- Location within Egypt
- Coordinates: 25°44′23.5″N 32°36′06.3″E
- Location: East Valley of the Kings
- Discovered: 10 October 1817
- Excavated by: Giovanni Belzoni
- Decoration: Book of Gates
- Layout: Straight axis
- ← Previous; KV15 Next → KV17

Tomb KV16 is located in the Valley of the Kings in Egypt. It was used for the burial of Pharaoh Ramesses I of the Nineteenth Dynasty. The burial place was discovered by Giovanni Belzoni in October 1817.

As Ramesses I ruled for less than two years, his sepulchre is rather truncated, being only twenty-nine metres long. It consists of two descending staircases, linking a sloping corridor and leading to the burial chamber. Like the tomb of Horemheb (KV57), the grave is decorated with the Book of Gates. The sarcophagus, still in place in the final chamber, is constructed of red quartzite.

== Gallery ==
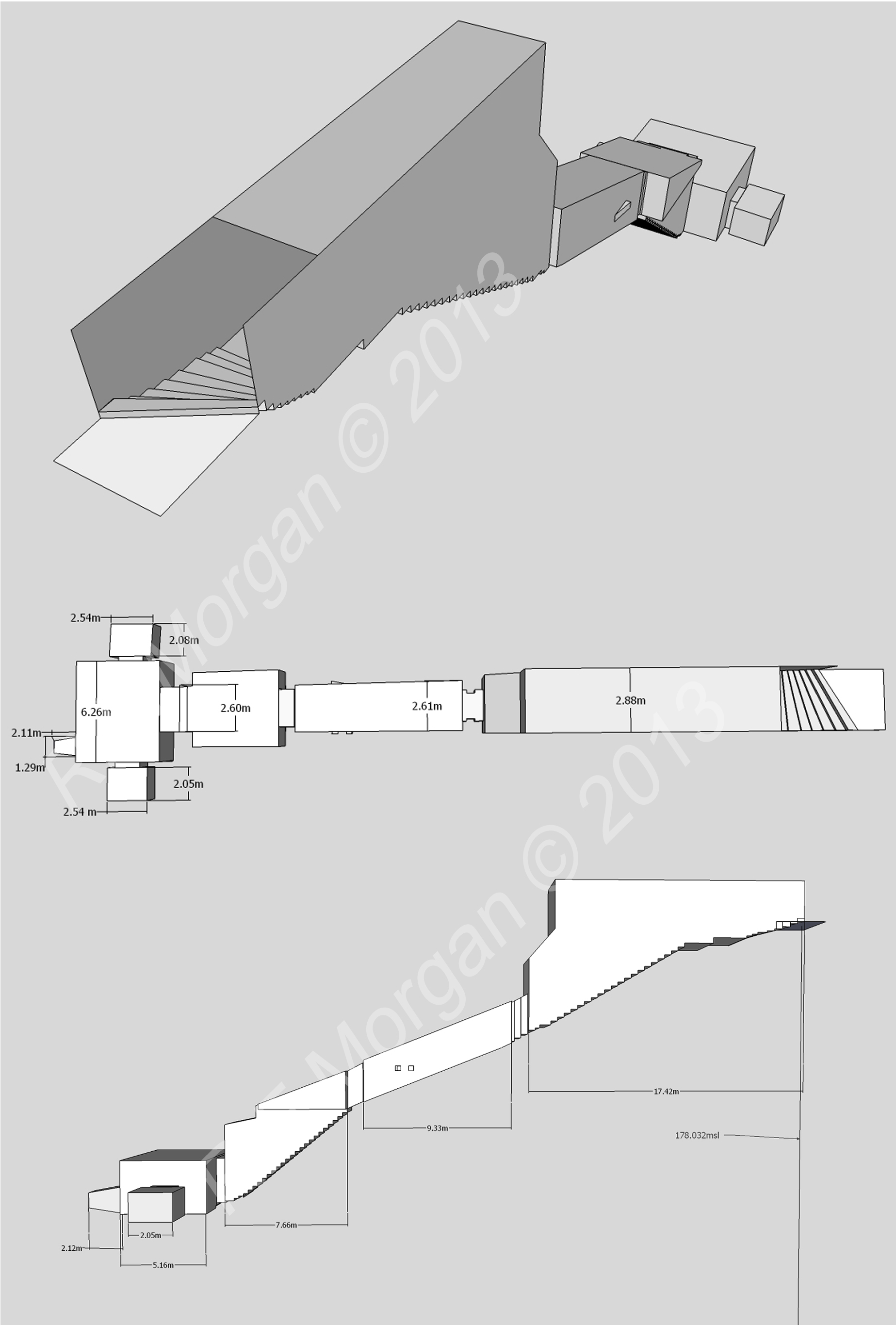
Plan of the tomb

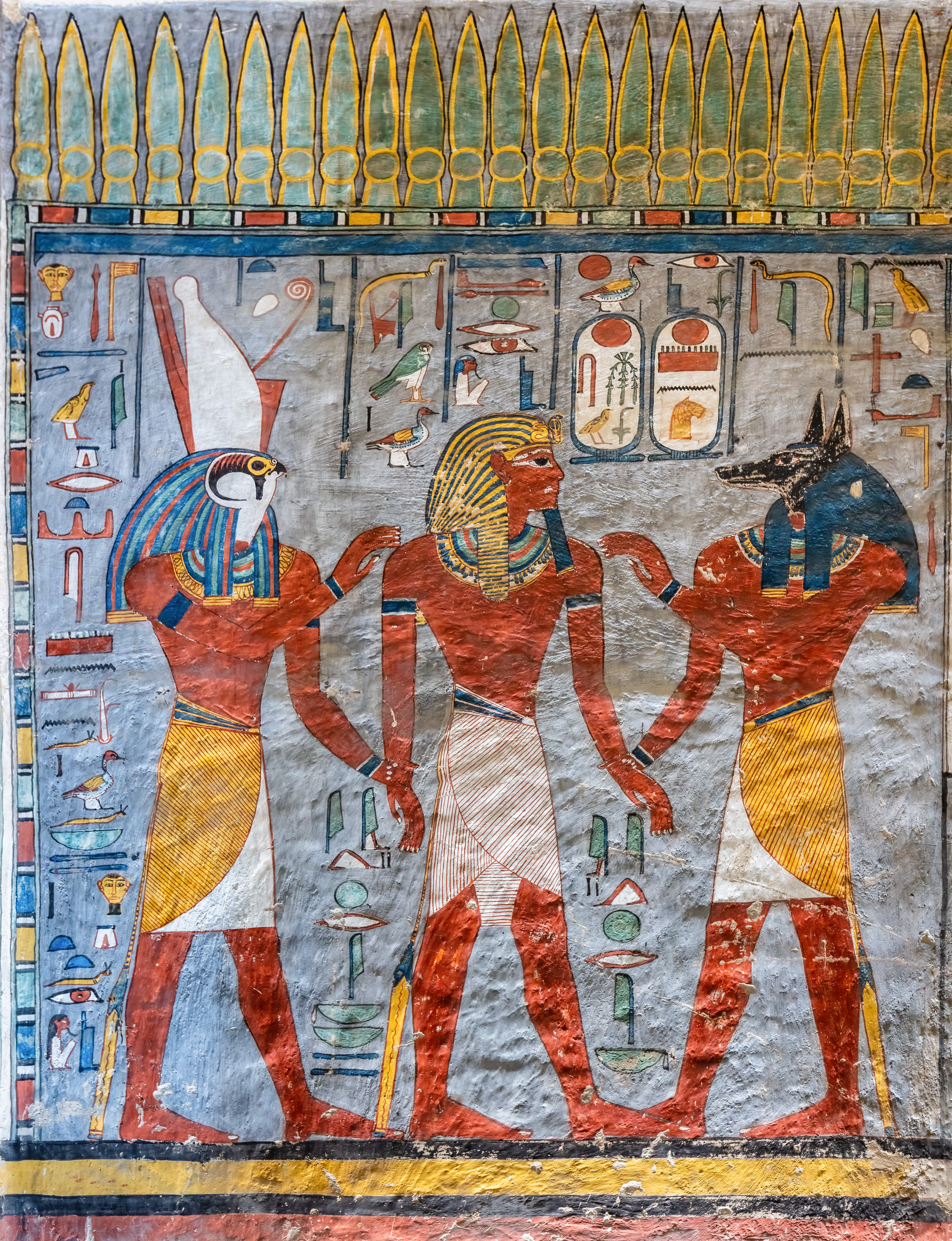
Ramesses I (middle) being accompanied by Horus (left) and Anubis (right)

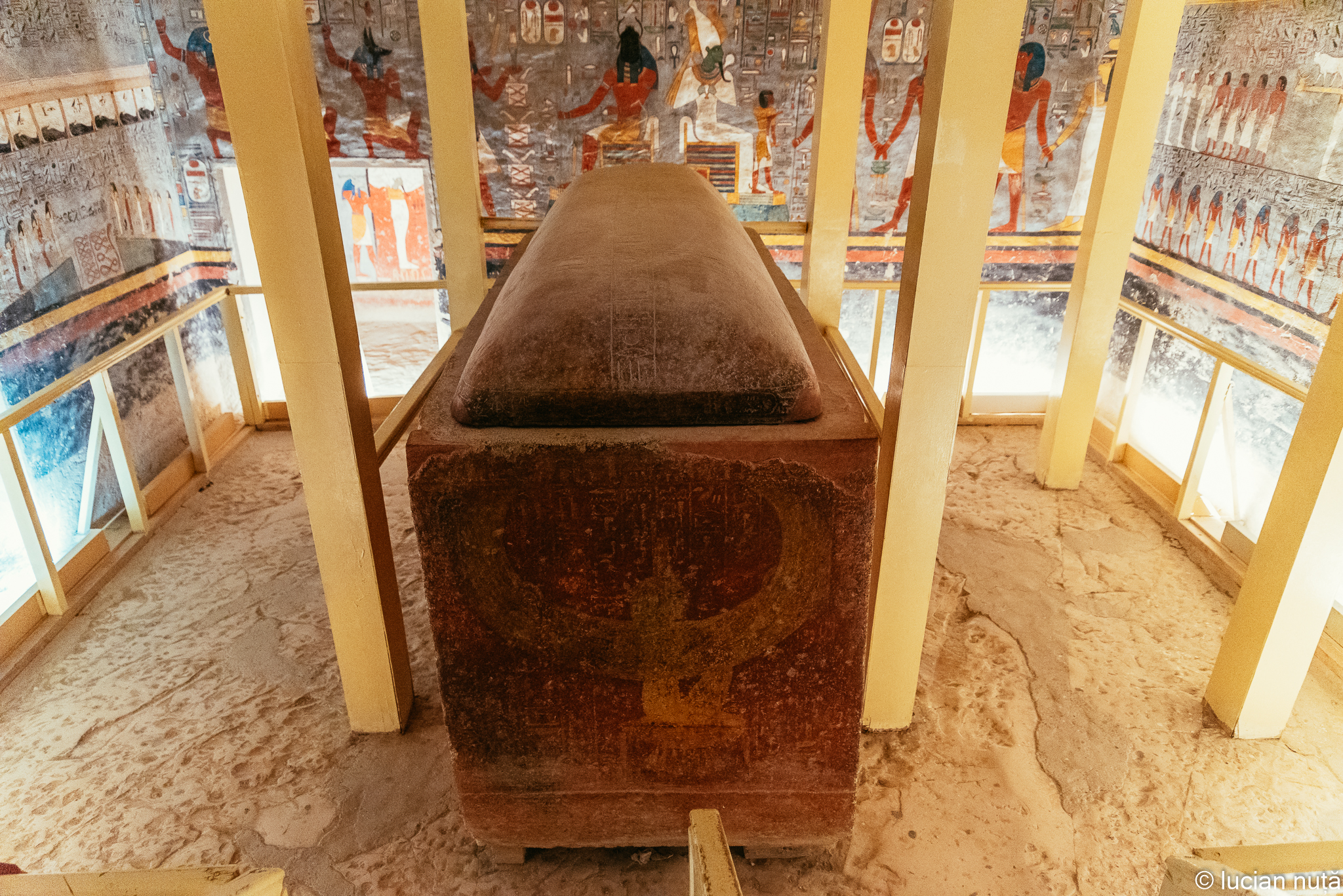
Ramesses I's sarcophagus in tomb KV16

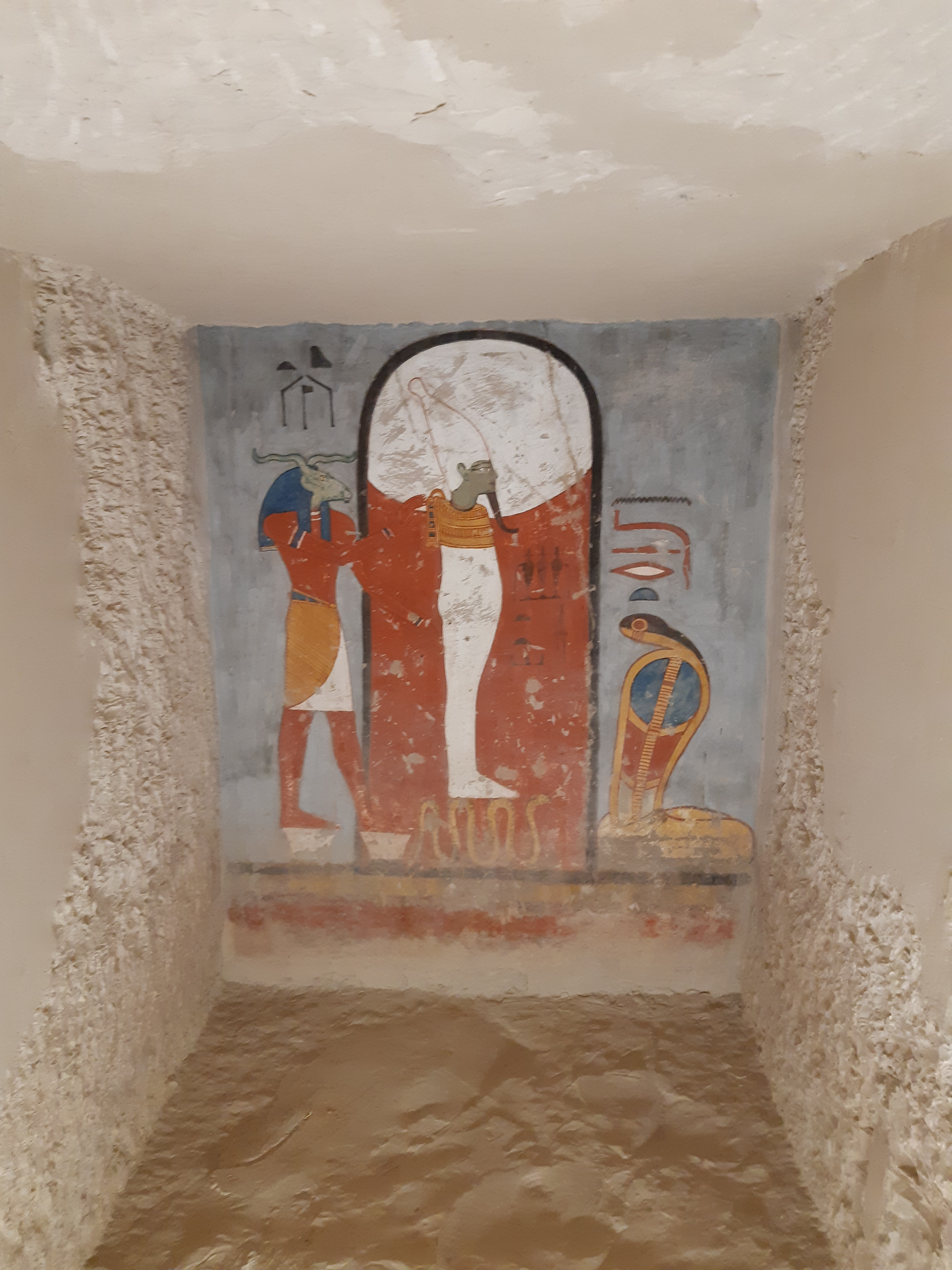
Osiris in tomb KV16

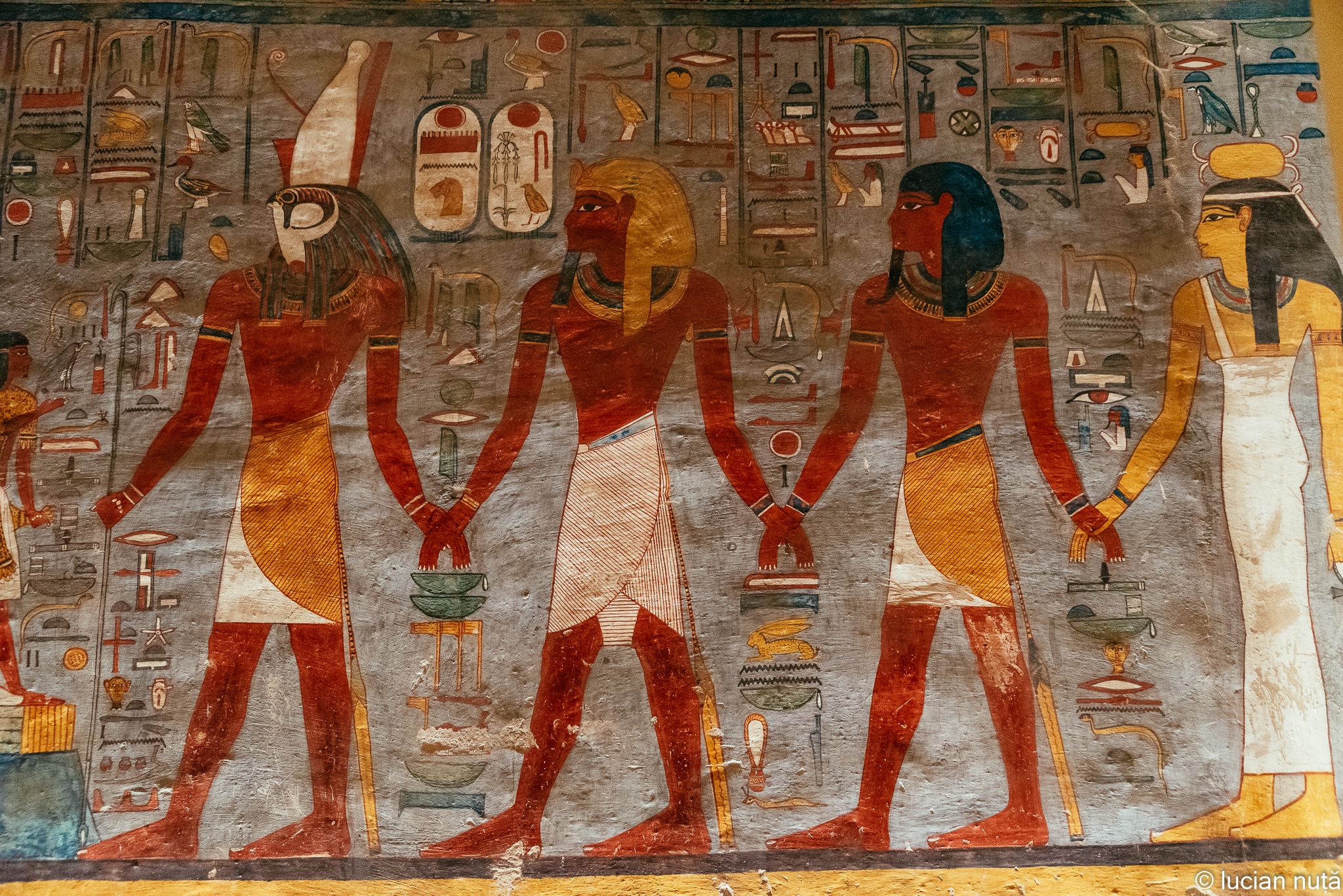
Egyptian gods in KV16
