= Ramesses I =

Founding pharaoh of 19th dynasty of Egypt

- Menophres
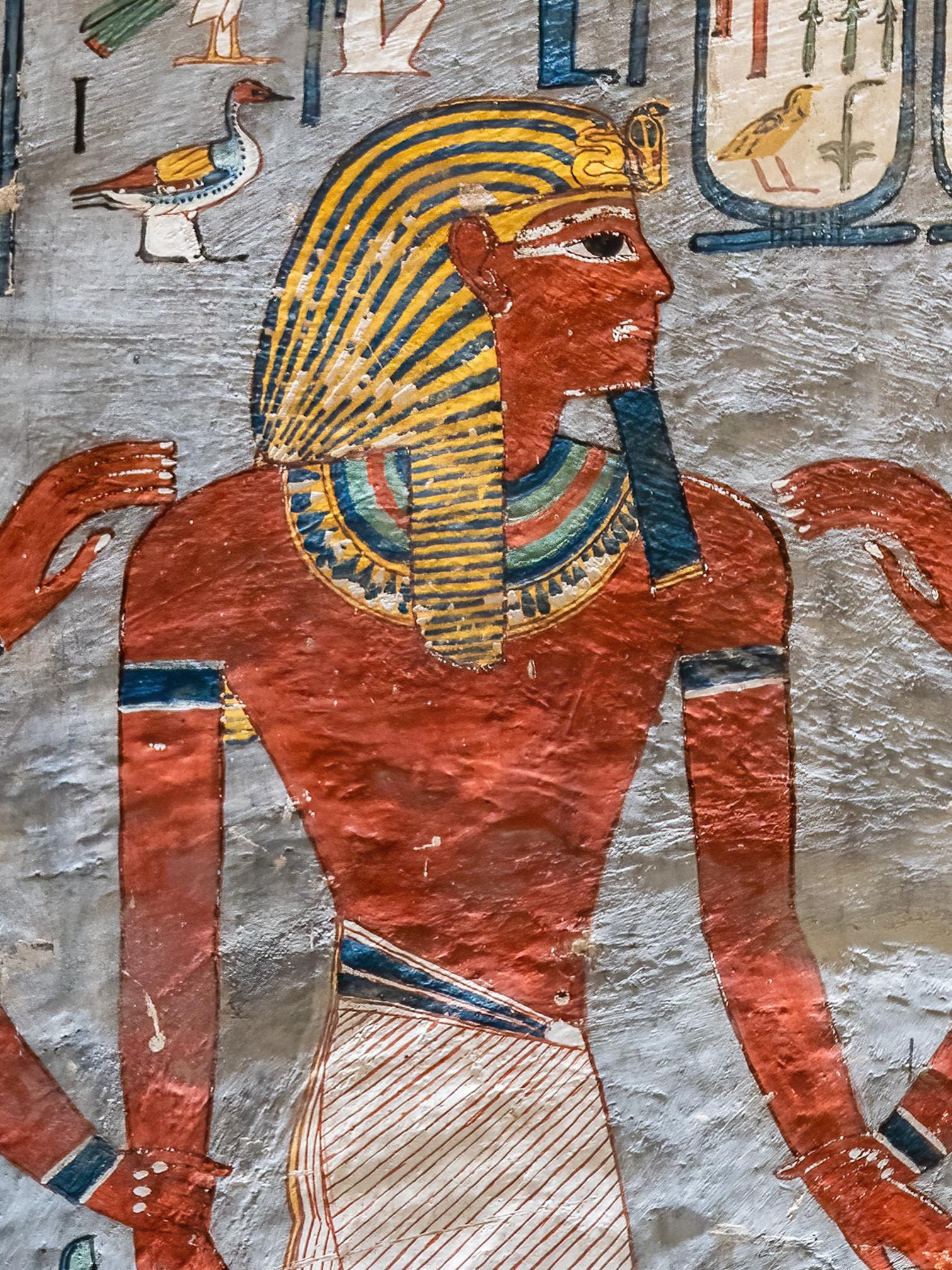
- Portrait of Ramesses I from his tomb in KV16

Pharaoh
- Reign: 2 regnal years 1292–1290 BC; 1295–1294 BC
- Predecessor: Horemheb
- Successor: Seti I
Royal titulary
Horus name
Kanakht Wadjnesut
kꜣ-nḫt wꜣḏ-nswt
Mighty bull, he who rejuvenates the royalty
G5	E1 D44 M13 M23 t i i Y1 Z2
Nebty name
Khaemnesutmiatem
ḫꜥ-m-nswt mj-jtm
He who appears as a king, like Atum
G16	N28 D36 Y1 m&t M23 A44 W19 i t Aa15 U15
Golden Horus
Semenmaatkhetawy
smn-mꜣꜥt-ḫt-ꜥwj
He who firms Maat throughout the land of the two banks
G8	s mn n U32 Aa11 M3 Aa1 t D54 N23
Prenomen
Menpehtyre
mn-pḥtj-rꜥ
Established is the Strength of Re

M23 X1 L2 X1	ra mn F9 t t
Nomen
Ramesses
rꜥ-ms-sw
Ra is the one who bore him

G39 N5	ra ms s sw w
- Consort: Sitre
- Children: Seti I
- Father: Seti
- Born: 14th century BC; Nile Delta, Egypt
- Died: 1290 BC or 1294 BC (aged c. 50s)
- Burial: KV16; Mummy found in the Deir el-Bahri royal cache (Theban Necropolis)
- Dynasty: 19th Dynasty

Menpehtyre Ramesses I (Note: Other Egyptian transliterations of the name Ramesses include Ramses and Rameses (from Koine Greek: Ῥαμέσσης, Rhaméssēs).) was the founding pharaoh of ancient Egypt's 19th Dynasty. The dates for his short reign are not completely known but the timeline of late 1292–1290 BC is frequently cited as well as 1295–1294 BC. While Ramesses I was the founder of the 19th Dynasty, his brief reign mainly serves to mark the transition between the reign of Horemheb, who had stabilized Egypt in the late 18th Dynasty, and the rule of the powerful pharaohs of his own dynasty, in particular his son Seti I and grandson Ramesses II.

== Origins ==
Paramessu
- Vizier of Egypt
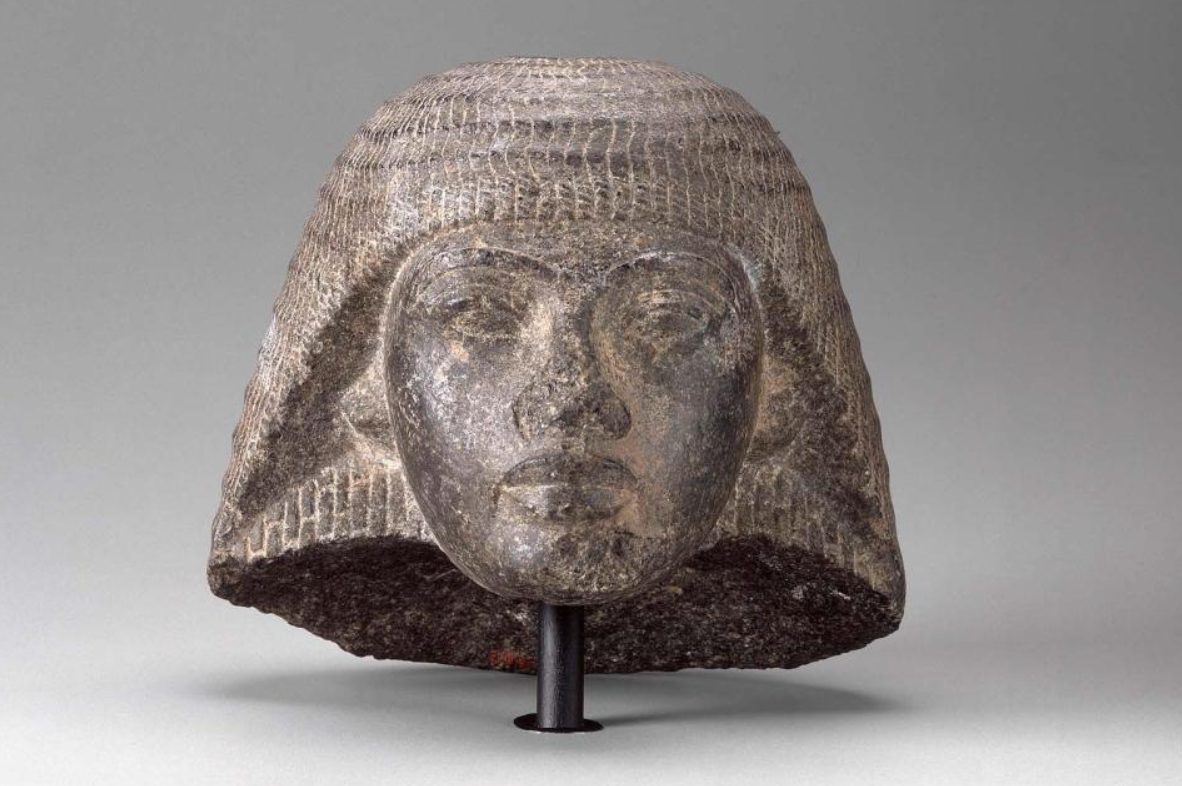
- Stone head carving of Paramessu (Ramesses I), originally part of a statue depicting him as a scribe; on display at the Museum of Fine Arts, Boston
- Dynasty: 18th Dynasty
- Pharaoh: Horemheb

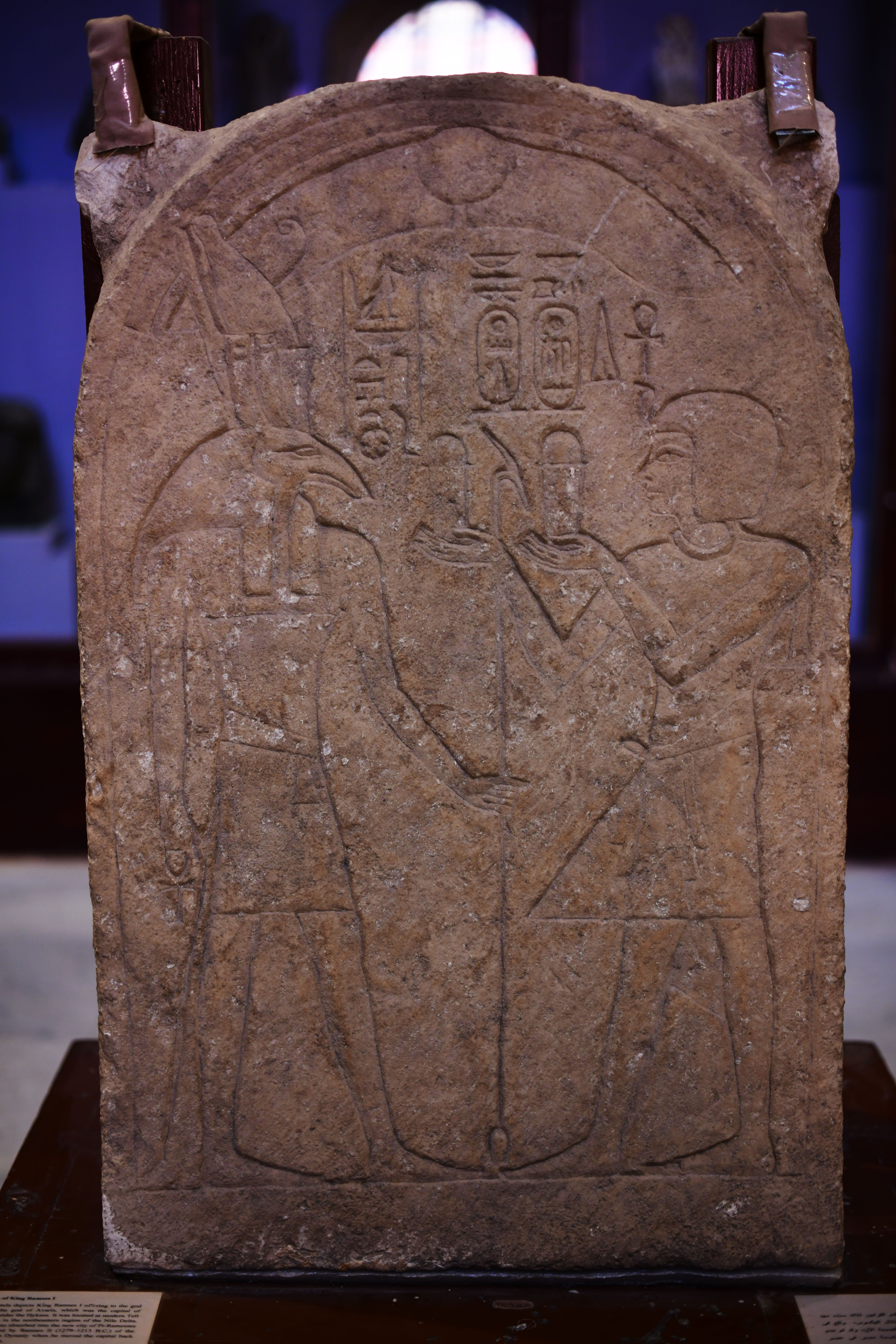
Stela of Ramesses I with the god Seth, for whom he was once the High Priest of under Amenhotep III

Originally called Paramessu, Ramesses I was of non-royal birth, being born into a noble military family from the Nile Delta region, perhaps near the former Hyksos capital of Avaris. He was a son of a troop commander called Seti. His uncle Khaemwaset, an army officer, married Tamwadjesy, the matron of Tutankhamun's Harem of Amun, who was a relative of Huy, the viceroy of Kush, an important state post. This shows the high status of Ramesses' family. Ramesses I found favor with Horemheb, the last pharaoh of the tumultuous Eighteenth Dynasty, who appointed him as his vizier. As Paramessu, Ramesses also served as the High Priest of Seth—as such, he will have played an important role in the restoration of the old religion following the Amarna heresy of a generation earlier, under Akhenaten. Horemheb himself had been a nobleman from outside the immediate royal family, who rose through the ranks of the Egyptian army to serve as the royal advisor to Tutankhamun and Ay and, ultimately, pharaoh. Since Horemheb had no surviving children, he ultimately chose Ramesses to be his heir in the final years of his reign presumably because Ramesses I was both an able administrator and had a son (Seti I) and a grandson (the future Ramesses II) to succeed him and thus avoid any succession difficulties.

== Reign ==
Upon his accession, Paramessu changed his nomen, or personal name to Ramesses. This is transliterated as rʿ-ms-sw, and is usually realised as Ramessu or Ramesses, meaning 'Ra bore him'. Ramesses also assumed a prenomen, or royal name. When transliterated, the prenomen is mn-pḥty-rʿ, which is usually interpreted as Menpehtyre, meaning "Established by the strength of Ra". However, he is better known by his nomen of Ramesses. Already an old man when he was crowned, Ramesses appointed his son, the later pharaoh Seti I, to serve as the Crown Prince and chosen successor. Seti was charged with undertaking several military operations during this time—in particular, an attempt to recoup some of Egypt's lost possessions in Syria. Ramesses appears to have taken charge of domestic matters: most memorably, he completed the second pylon at Karnak Temple, begun under Horemheb.

Ramesses I reigned briefly, as evidenced by the lack of contemporary monuments mentioning him: the king had little time to build any major buildings in his reign and was hurriedly buried in a small and hastily finished tomb. According to the Jewish historian Josephus, in his book Contra Apionem which translated Manetho's Aegyptiaca, Manetho assigns this king a reign of 16 months, but this pharaoh certainly ruled Egypt for a minimum of 17 months based on his highest-known date which is a Year 2 II Peret day 20 (Louvre C57) stela which ordered the provision of new endowments of food and priests for the temple of Ptah within the Egyptian fortress of Buhen. In contrast, Ramesses I's son and successor, Seti I, assumed the throne five months later after the erection of this stela on III Shemu day 24 which means that Ramesses I had a minimum reign of 17 months (or one year and five months). However, based on a papyrus document published by Robert J. Demarée in a 2023 publication, Demarée argues that Ramesses I's predecessor, Horemheb, died on III Shemu 22 based on evidence in Papyrus Turin Cat. 1898 + Cat. 1937 + Cat. 2094/244, which is a journal diary. If confirmed, this would mean that Ramesses I actually had a reign of approximately two full years since he would have ascended to the throne around III Shemu 23 soon after Horemheb's death on III Shemu 22 and died about two years later around the very same day since Ramesses I's son, Seti I, succeeded his father on III Shemu 24.

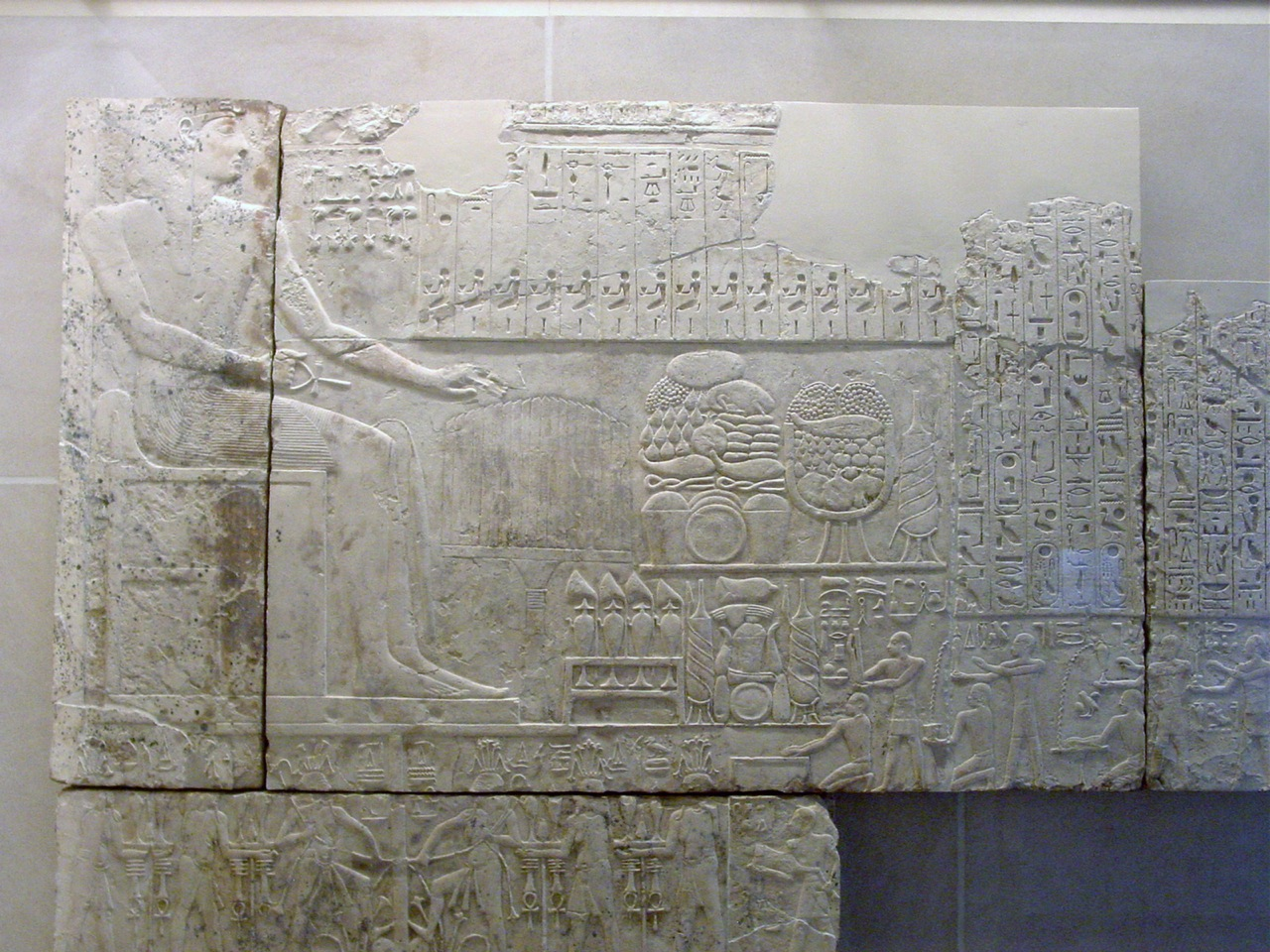
Reliefs from the Abydos chapel of Ramesses I. The chapel was specifically built and dedicated by Seti I in memory of his late father.

Ramesses I's only known action was to order the provision of endowments for the aforementioned Nubian temple at Buhen and "the construction of a chapel and a temple (which was to be finished by his son) at Abydos."

== Death ==
Given that Ramesses was previously a vizier, it's likely that he had commissioned a tomb in Saqqara that went unused due to his accession to pharaoh. The unused outer and inner coffins that were made when he was a vizier were later taken to Gurob for use in the burial of his great-grandson Ramesses-Meryamun-Nebweben, and the inscriptions were changed to his name instead of that of Ramesses I, although only the outer coffin was ultimately used, and the inner one was found by archeologists in a pit in Medinet Habu.

Ramesses was buried in the Valley of the Kings. His tomb, discovered by Giovanni Belzoni in 1817 and designated KV16, is small in size and gives the impression of having been completed with haste. Joyce Tyldesley states that Ramesses I's tomb consisted of a single corridor and one unfinished room whose walls, after a hurried coat of plaster, were painted to show the king with his gods, with Osiris allowed a prominent position. The red granite sarcophagus too was painted rather than carved with inscriptions which, due to their hasty preparation, included a number of unfortunate errors.

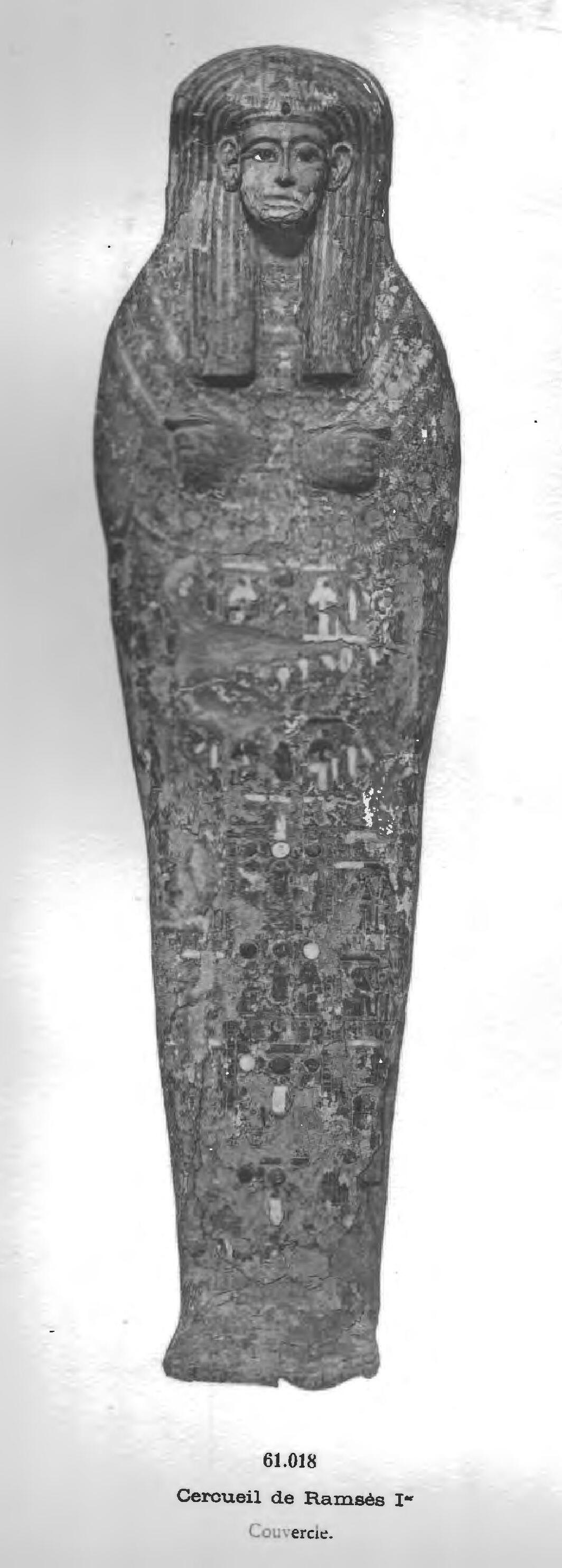
Coffin of Ramesses I

Seti I, his son and successor, later built a small chapel with fine reliefs in memory of his deceased father Ramesses I at Abydos. In 1911, John Pierpont Morgan donated several exquisite reliefs from this chapel to the Metropolitan Museum of Art in New York.

=== Rediscovery and repatriation ===
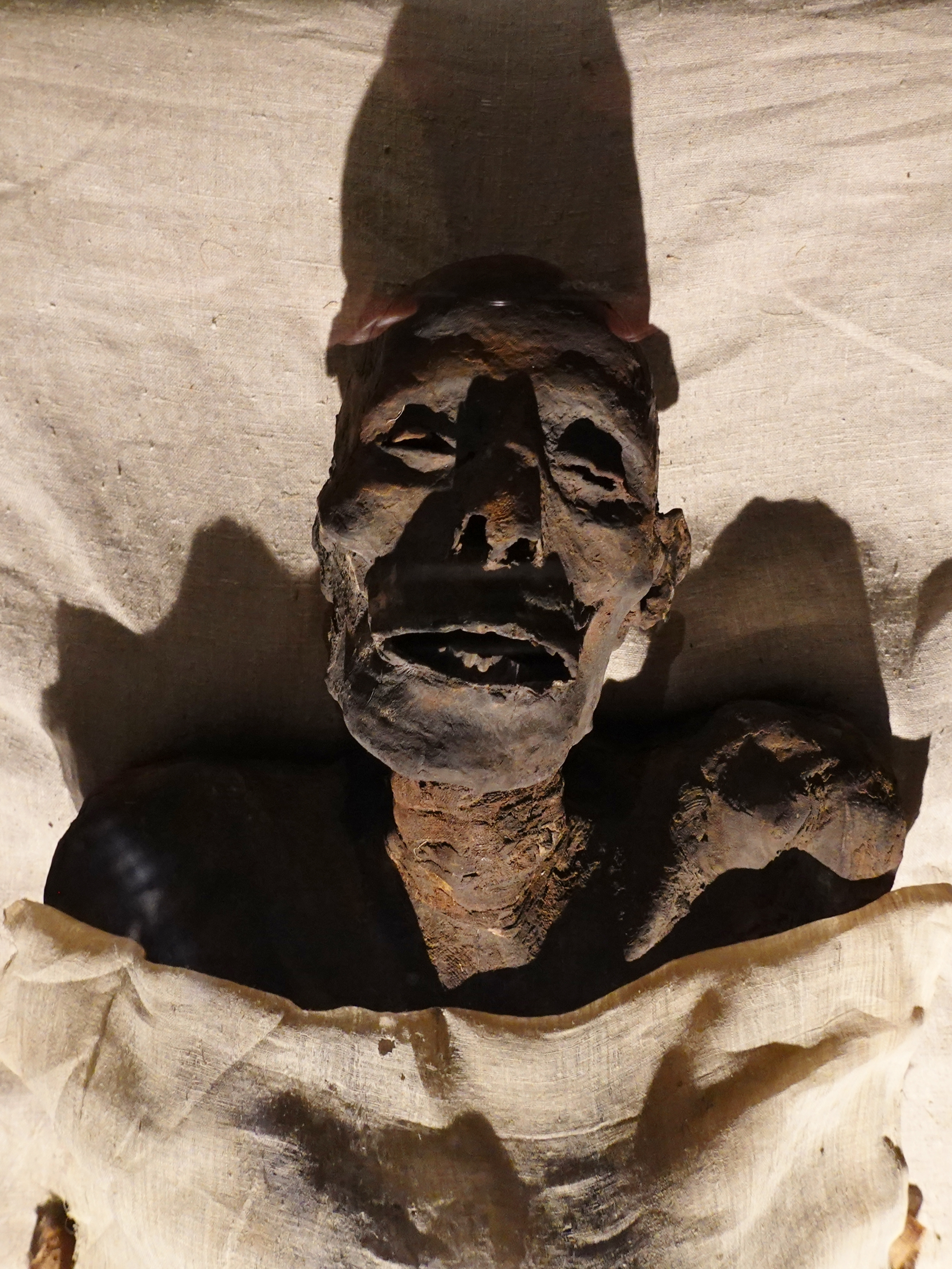

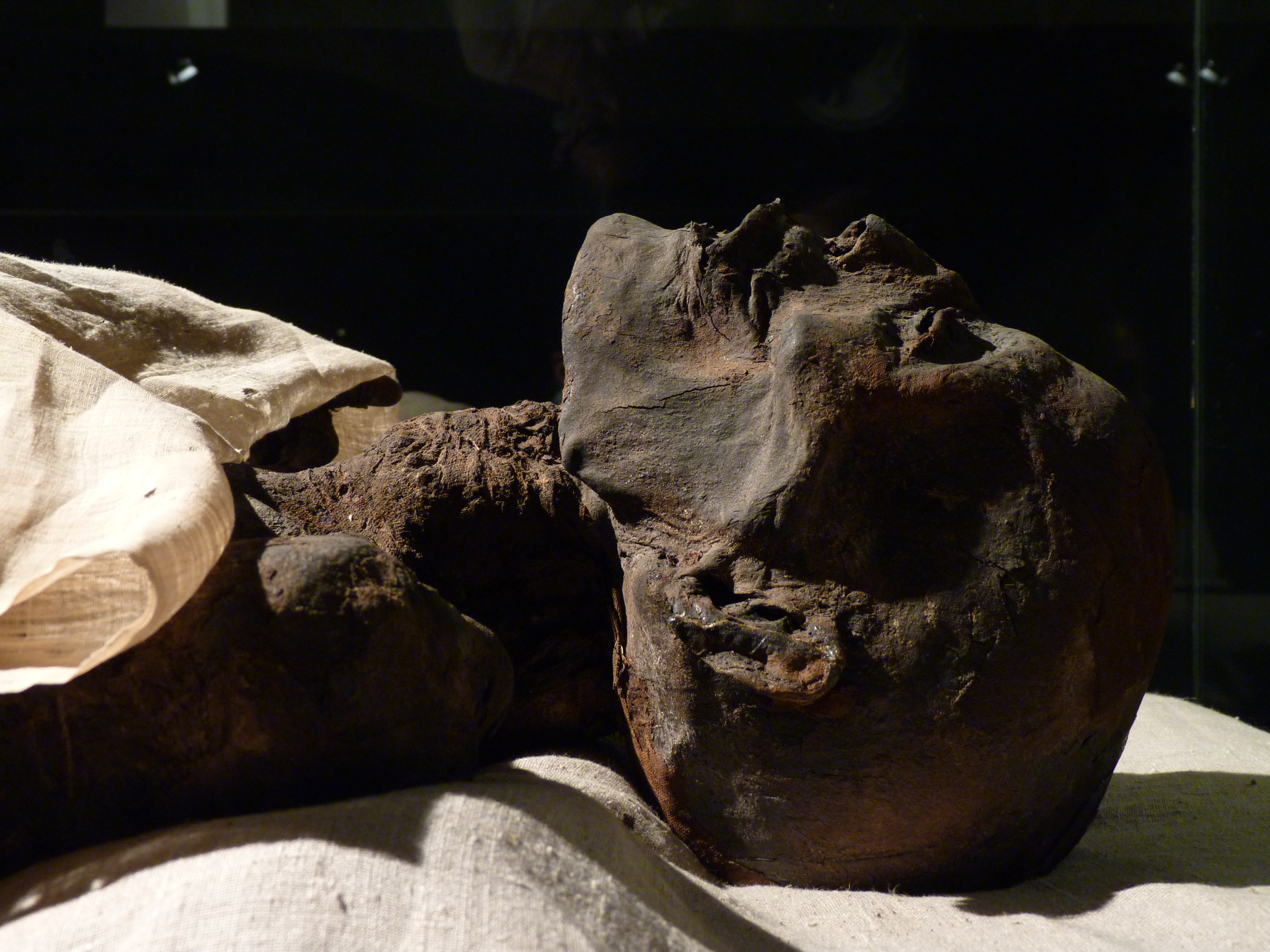
Mummy of Ramesses I

A mummy currently believed to be that of Ramesses I was displayed in a private Canadian museum for many years before being repatriated. The mummy's identity cannot be conclusively determined, but is most likely to be that of Ramesses I on the basis of CT scans, X-rays, skull measurements and radiocarbon dating tests by researchers at Emory University, as well as aesthetic interpretations of family resemblance. Moreover, the mummy's arms were found crossed high across his chest, which was a position reserved solely for Egyptian royalty until 600 BC.

The mummy had been stolen from the Royal Cache in Deir el-Bahari by the Abd el-Rassul family of grave robbers and sold by Turkish vice-consular agent Mustapha Aga Ayat at Luxor to Dr. James Douglas, who brought it to North America around 1860. Douglas used to purchase Egyptian antiquities for his friend Sydney Barnett who then placed it in the Niagara Falls Museum. At the time, the identity of the mummified man was unknown. The mummy remained in the museum through moves to Niagara Falls, New York, and Niagara Falls, Ontario, next to other curiosities for more than 130 years. The mummy was displayed as a "A Prince of Egypt," but despite occasional speculation from visitors that he might be exactly that, no further investigation was done.

When the owner of the museum decided to sell his property, the Canadian businessman William Jamieson purchased the contents of the museum and, with the help of the Canadian egyptologist Gayle Gibson, identified their great value. In 1999, Jamieson sold the Egyptian artifacts in the collection, including the various mummies, to the Michael C. Carlos Museum at Emory University in Atlanta, Georgia, for US$2 million. The mummy was returned to Egypt on October 24, 2003, with full official honors and is on display at the Luxor Museum.

== Portrayals in film ==
- In the film The Ten Commandments, he was played by Ian Keith, as the Pharaoh of the Oppression.
- In the miniseries In the Beginning, he was portrayed by Christopher Lee, as the Pharaoh encountered by Joseph. Lee had previously played Ramses' grandson Ramesses II in the miniseries Moses.

== Bibliography ==
- Hawass, Zahi A.; Saleem, Sahar (2016). Scanning the Pharaohs: CT Imaging of the New Kingdom Royal Mummies. Oxford University Press. ISBN 9789774166730.
- Wilson, John A. (1964). "Signs & Wonders upon Pharaoh" (PDF). The University of Chicago Press.
