= Thutmose (viceroy of Kush) =

Ancient Egyptian official, viceroy of Kush

Thutmose (fl. c. 1340 BC) was the Viceroy of Kush during the reign of Amenhotep IV. Thutmose was given the titles King's Son of Kush, Overseer of the Gold Lands of Amun, Overseer of masons, Overseer of the borderlands of His Majesty, and Fan-bearer on the King's right.

In year 12 of Amenhotep IV, Thutmose was ordered to put down a rebellion by some of the Nubians, according to a stela set up at Buhen. Here were found the fragments of the stela mentioning this rebellion and a viceroy of Kush. The latter's name is lost but it seems likely that it was Thutmose as he is so far the only known viceroy of Kush datable under Amenhotep IV.
