= Khaemwaset (Nubian official) =

Khaemwaset was an important ancient Egyptian under king Tutankhamun. His main titles were troop commander of Kush and fan-bearer on the Right Side of the King. As troop commander of Kush he was in charge of the military forces in Nubia (Kush is the Egyptian word for Nubia) at the end of the 18th Dynasty. He is known from a statue found at Kawa, that shows him together with his wife Taemwadjsy.

It has been argued that this Khaemwaset is identical to a person with the same name known from a stela now in Chicago (Oriental Institute Museum [OI 11456]). The latter Khaemwaset is the brother of a certain Seti. However, the stela most likely dates to Amenhotep III, a generation before Tutankhamun, making the identification unlikely.
