= Taemwadjsy =

Ancient Egyptian woman

- Superintendent of the Harem of Amun
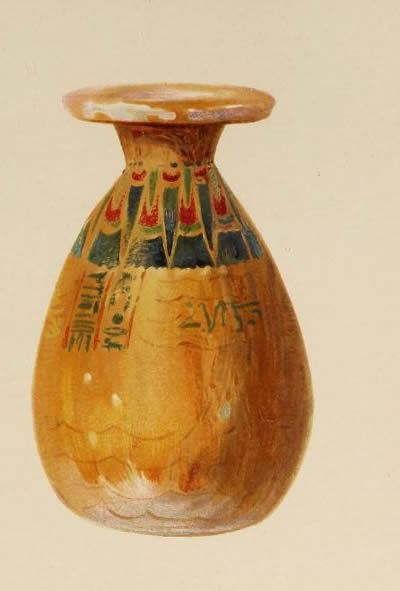
- Vase of Taemwadjsy from tomb KV46
- Dynasty: 18th Dynasty
- Pharaoh: Tutankhamun
- Spouse: Khaemwaset; Amenhotep-Huy
- Father: Yuya?
- Mother: Thuya?
- Children: Paser I Tjuri

Taemwadjsy (tꜣ-m-wꜣḏ⸗s) was an Ancient Egyptian harem matron under pharaoh Tutankhamun.

Taemwadjsy is known from a high number of sources and was great one of the harem of Amun, a title only reserved for very important women, often family members of the royal house. A vessel found in the tomb KV46 bears her name and title. KV46 is the tomb of Yuya and Thuya who are the parents of queen Tiye. This might indicate that Taemwadjsy was related to the king's family. She might have been a daughter of Yuya and Thuya or even a daughter of queen Tiye. Otherwise, Taemwadjsy is best known as the wife of Amenhotep called Huy, who served as Viceroy of Kush under king Tutankhamun. Together they appear on several monuments found in Lower Nubia, although her name is not preserved in the tomb of Amenhotep called Huy. She appears also on a statue of Khaemwaset, who was the brother of the commander Seti, who was the father of king Ramesses I. However, it is not certain that the Khaemwaset, brother of Seti is identical with Khaemwaset, husband of Taemwadjsy and known from Nubian sources.

Perhaps she married Khaemwaset after the death of Amenhotep called Huy. Although it is also possible that she married Khaemwaset first and married Amenhotep called Huy after the first had died. There are two sons known from her marriage with Amenhotep called Huyː Tjuri, Charioteer of the King, King’s Envoy, First Stable Master and Paser, Overseer of Horse, Stable Master, Fanbearer. Paser followed his father in the position of a viceroy of Kush.
