= Amenhotep called Huy =

Ancient Egyptian official, Viceroy of Kush

- Viceroy of Kush
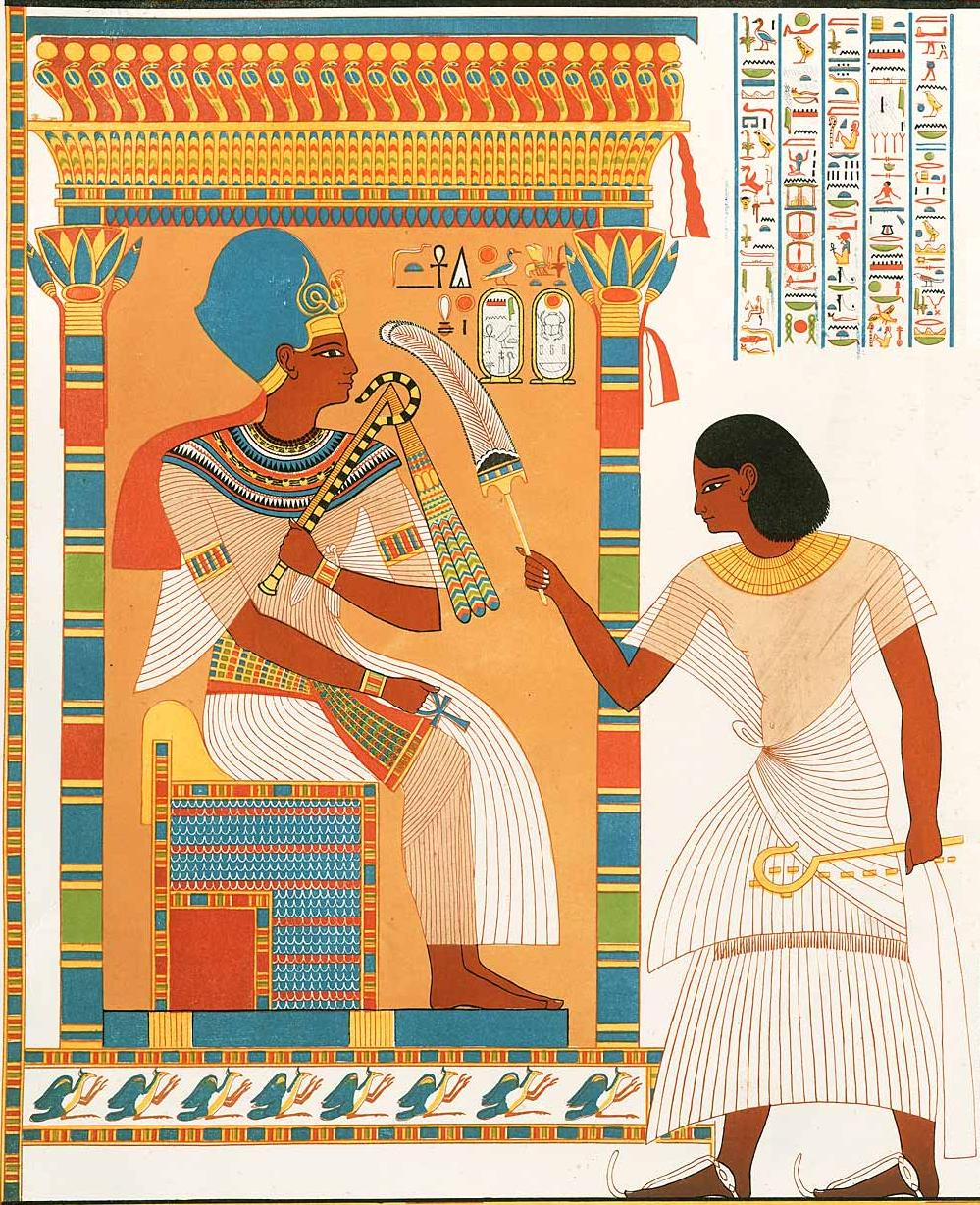
- Huy before Tutankhamen in TT 40
- Predecessor: Tuthmose (Viceroy of Kush)
- Successor: Paser I
- Dynasty: 18th Dynasty
- Pharaoh: Tutankhamen
- Burial: TT40, Thebes
- Spouse: Taemwadjsy
- Mother: Wenher
- Children: Paser I

Amenhotep called Huy was Viceroy of Kush under 18th Dynasty King Tutankhamen. He was the successor of Tuthmosis, who served under Akhenaten. He would later be succeeded by Paser I, his son.

== Family ==
Huy was the son of a lady named Wenher by an unknown father. Huy was married to Taemwadjsy, chief of the harem of Amun and of the Harem of Nebkheperure (Tutankhamun). They had a son named Paser.

== Career ==
Huy held power spanning from Hierakonpolis to the Napatan area, conducting his governance from the protected city of Faras. He had numerous duties, including serving as a courier for Egyptian royalty. As "Overseer of all of the gold lands of Amun," Huy oversaw gold production operations, such as preserving mining sites, and collected Nubia's revenue, which included the collection of inw (gold, ivory, ebony, and other valuable goods). Depictions of this duty is depicted in the Southern Section of Huy's tomb.

Other people associated with Huy: include Harnufer, "Scribe of the gold-accounts of the king's son", and Kna, "Scribe of the king's son"

Huy had at least two administrative assistants, one for Upper Nubia, and one of Lower Nubia. The administrative assistant for Lower Nubia was Paenniut.

=== Titles ===
Titles of Huy: Hereditary prince, King's son of Kush, King's Son overseer of the Southern Lands, Scribe of the letters of the viceroy, Merymose, King's scribe, Mery-netjer priest, King's messenger to every land.

=== Cult of Deified Tutankhamun ===
Also, Huy constructed a temple to the deified form of Tutankhamun. His brother, Mermose, was the Second Prophet of Tutankhamun, referred to as Nebkheperure in hymn.

==== Stela of Huy ====
The artifact known as the Stela of Huy from Karnak Temple is evidential of the lifetime-deification of pharaoh Tutankhamun. It contains a hymn directed to the deified form of Tutankhamun, clearly regarded him with equivalent divinity as the god Amun. Below is an English translation

Give praises the ka of Amun,
lord of Karnak homage to Amun,
by whom swear the Two Lands
and ... to the royal ka of Tutankhamun:
that they may give a happy lifetime and a body, joyful, every day,
to the ka of the royal son of Kush,
the overseer of the countries of the south, Huy
Come in peace my lord, Tutankhamun,
for I see the day-time darkness thou has made.
Illumine me that I may see thee.
I tell thy will to fishes in the river.
Royal son of Kush, Huy, given life for ever.

The darkness that Huy is referring to could be medical blindness of his vision, or could be figurative.

== Burial Site ==
Amenhotep Huy was buried in TT40 located in Qurnet Murai, Thebes, Egypt. The tomb is situated behind Amenhotep III's funerary temple and contains illustrations of Huy carrying out his responsibilities as well as everyday activities. There is one reference to a Temple named "Satisfying the Gods" in Nubia. Huy is shown being greeted there by Khay, High Priest of Nebkheperure (Tutankhamen), Penne, Deputy of the fortress of Nebkheperure (Tutankhamen), Huy, the Mayor, and his brother Mermose.

=== Tomb Narrative ===
A set of depictions on the outer chamber of the tomb showcases Huy receiving appointments and gaining influence as Viceroy of Kush. The first illustration displays Huy's appointment from King Tutankhamun surrounded by family and couriers. Representing his new nomination in governing Upper Nubia and Upper Egypt for the Pharaoh, Huy is next shown leaving the palace with flowers. Finally, a representation of Huy thanking the gods at the Temple of Amun is presented in the final, undamaged scene.

=== Tribute Scenes ===
The tomb includes imagery of wealth and inw being presented to royalty in "tribute scenes". Huy's tomb has two tribute scenes on its western wall. The Southern section features a Nubian tribute scene depicting envoys and chieftains from Wawat and Kush presenting offerings to Huy, including animal skins, giraffes' tails, and captives. The Northern section displays an Asiatic tribute scene where Retenu chiefs present horses, lapis, gold, silver, and copper which Huy is later depicted delivering to King Tutankhamun.
