= Temple of Derr =

Coordinates: 22°43′56.6″N 32°15′43.6″E

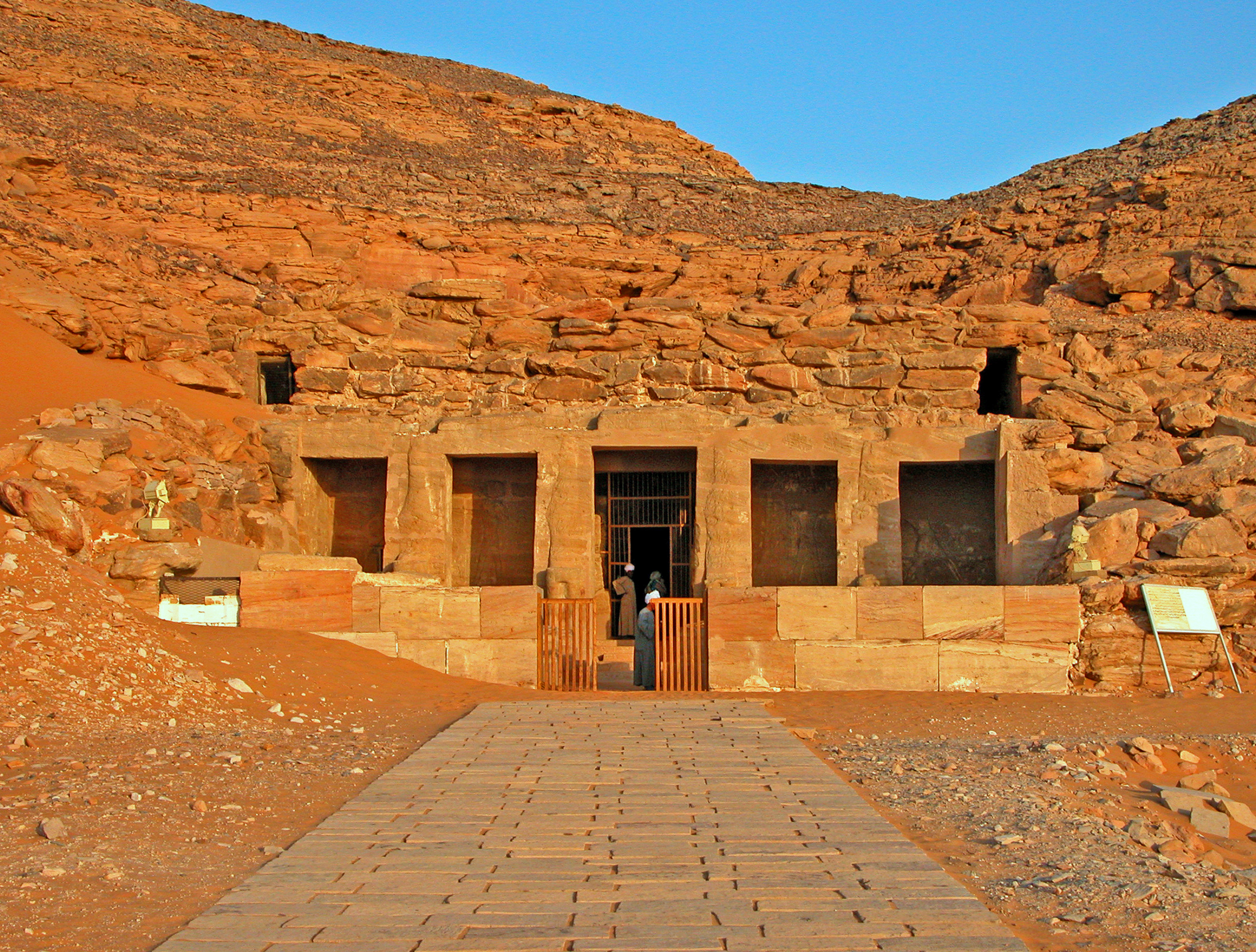
Facade of the reassembled Temple of Derr

The Temple of Derr or el-Derr is a speos or rock-cut Egyptian temple, now located in New Amada in Lower Nubia. It was built during the 19th dynasty by Pharaoh Ramesses II. It is the only rock-cut temple in Nubia, which was constructed by this pharaoh on the right (or east) bank of the Nile and used to stand at el-Derr. The temple's unique position "was probably because the river on its approach to the Korosko bend flows in an 'unnatural' southeasterly direction". The Derr structure was known in ancient times as 'The Temple of Ri'amsese-meryamun [Ramesses II] in the Domain of Re' and was dedicated to the god Ra-Horakhty. Scholars disagree over its precise construction date: the French Egyptologist Nicolas Grimal states that it was built in the thirtieth year of Ramesses II, presumably to coincide with his first royal jubilee. John Baines and Jaromír Málek also write that the temple of Derr "was built in the second half of the king's reign", likely because its "plan and decoration resembles the Great Temple of Abu Simbel (minus the colossal seated statues against the facade)". Abu Simbel was built between Year 24 and Year 31 of Ramesses' reign. According to Joyce Tyldesley, the Temple of Derr was built by Setau, who is known to have served as Ramesses' Viceroy of Kush or Nubia between Year 38 to 63 of this pharaoh's reign.

It was relocated as part of the International Campaign to Save the Monuments of Nubia.

== Description ==
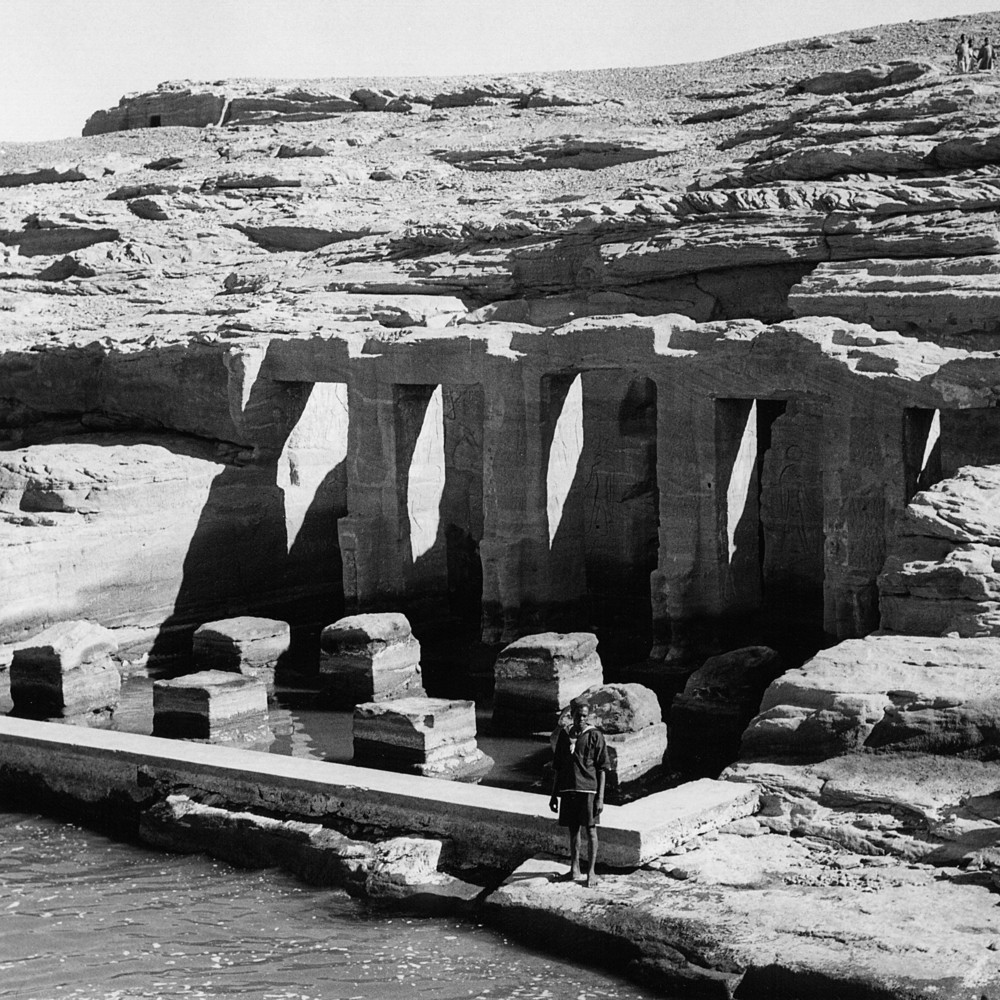
Temple ruins in 1960, before being relocated. At this point, the rising levels of Lake Nasser had already started to flood it.

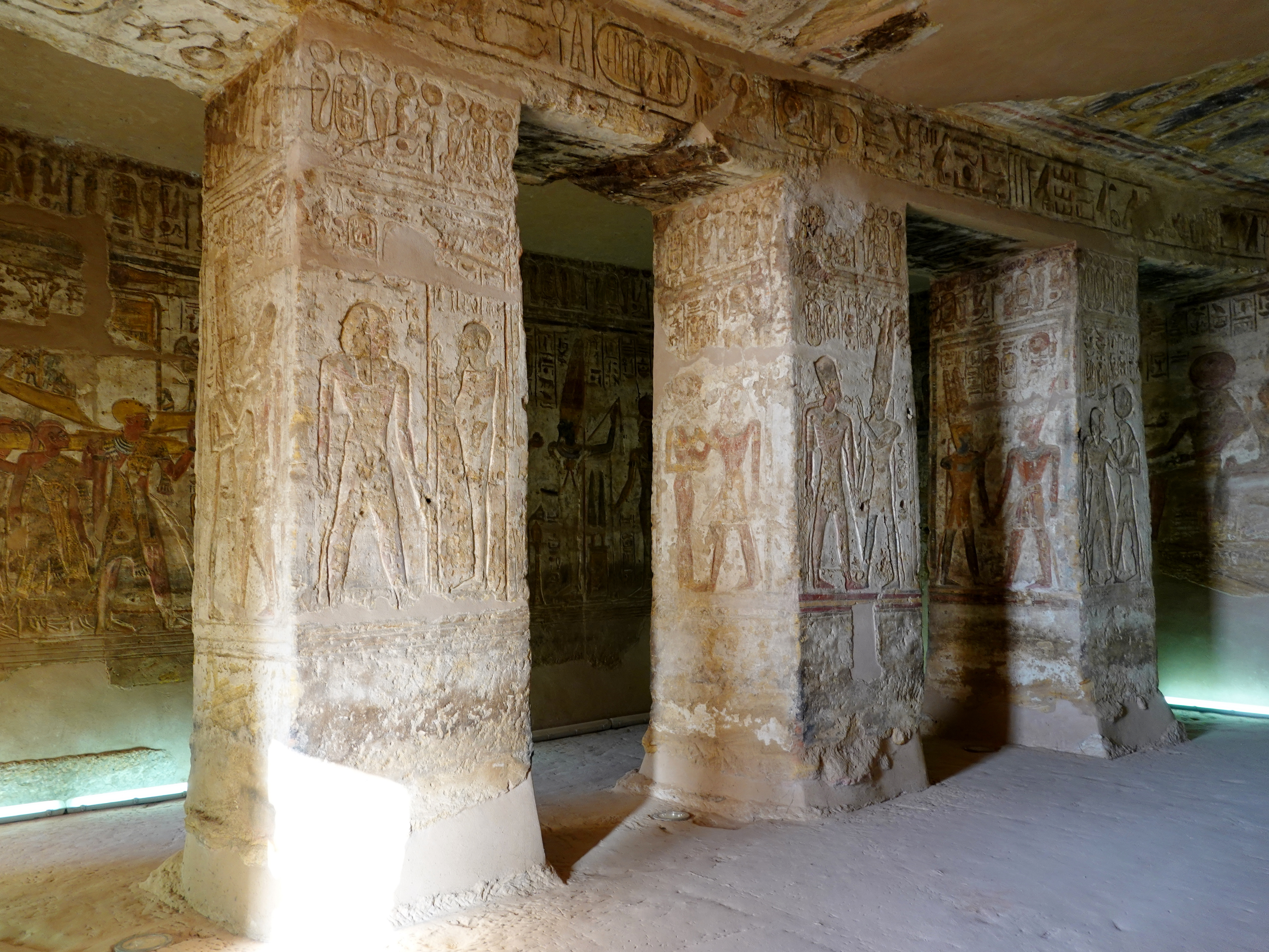
Stone columns in the Temple of Derr.

The temple of Derr is more elaborate than the speos of Beit el-Wali and "consisted of a sequence of two hypostyle halls (probably preceded by a forecourt and a pylon) leading to a triple sanctuary where a cult of statues of Ramesses II, Amon-Re, Ra-Horakhty and Ptah was celebrated."

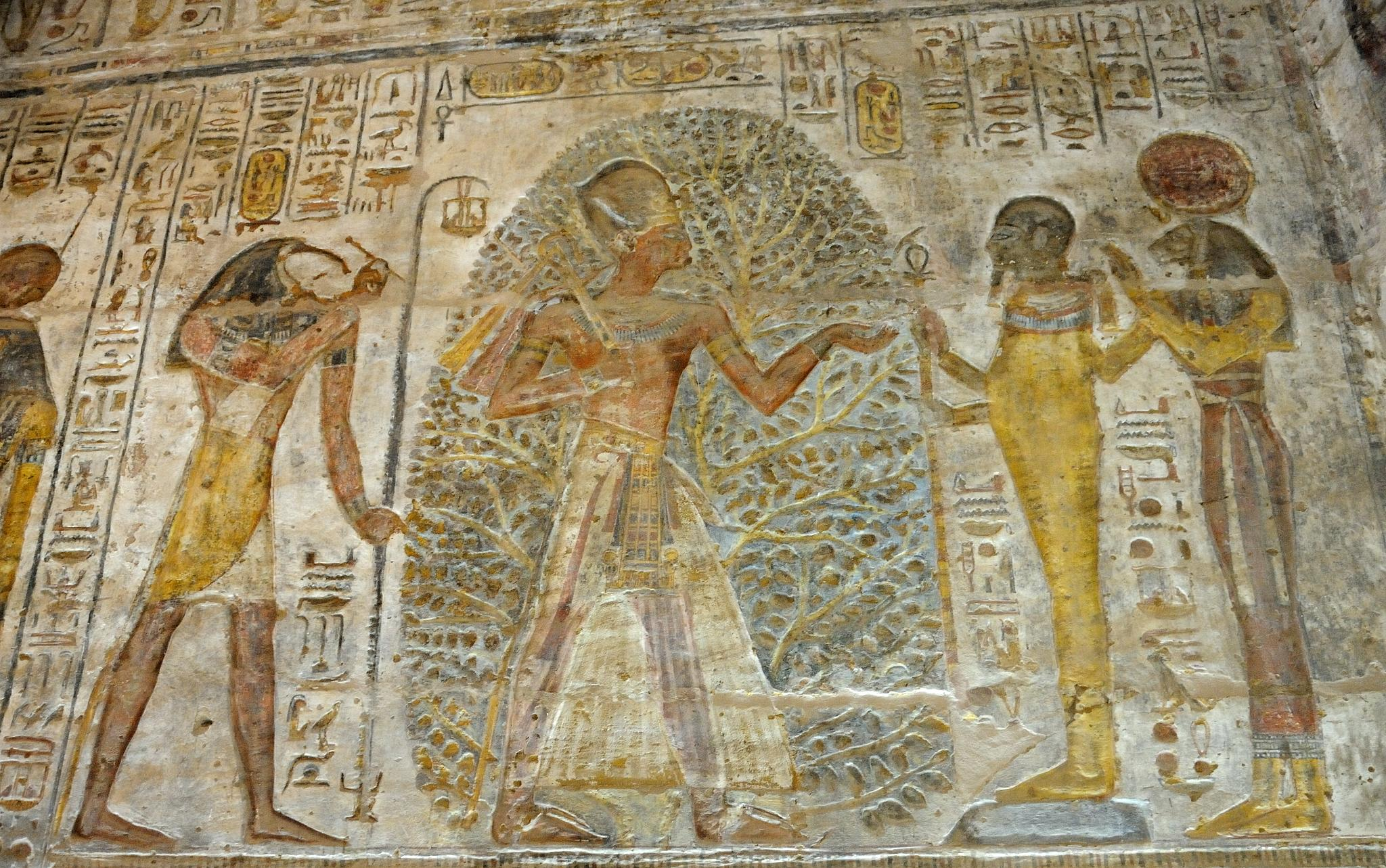
Relief of Ramesses II in the temple of Derr

When cleaned and restored in modern times, Derr proved to contain unusually bright and vivid relief decorations which contrasted sharply "with the more subdued color tones" from other Egyptian temples.

In 1964, the temple was dismantled and relocated, as part of the International Campaign to Save the Monuments of Nubia, along with the Temple of Amada, to a new site. Early travellers visited the original site, and the temple itself was first studied and published by Aylward Blackman in 1913.

== See also ==
- List of ancient Egyptian sites, including sites of temples
