= Huy (Viceroy of Kush) =

Ancient Egyptian official, viceroy of Kush

- Viceroy of Kush
- Predecessor: Paser II?
- Successor: Setau?
- Dynasty: 19th Dynasty
- Pharaoh: Ramesses II

Huy was Viceroy of Kush during the reign of Ramesses II. He may have served either before or after Setau. Huy was also Mayor of Tjarw and a royal messenger to the Hatti.

According to an inscription, he escorted Queen Maathorneferure from Hatti to Egypt. His titles include: Stablemaster of the Residence of Ramesses II, Royal Envoy to every foreign country, Viceroy of Kush, superintendent of the Southern Desert Lands, Fanbearer on the king's Right Hand.

== Monuments ==
Viceroy Huy is known from several sources:

- Inscription near Aswan, along the ancient road (LH 25) Inscription next to a cartouche of the King
- Sehel, Graffito (LH 26) The Viceroy appears twice in the company of Ramesses II.
- Sehel Graffito (LH 27) The Viceroy adores the royal Cartouche. The King offers to the Khnum and Anuqet.
- Sehel Graffito (LH 28) The Viceroy appears before the seated King.
- Sehel Graffito (LH 29) The Viceroy adores the royal Cartouche.

Further attestations of Huy appear at the fortress of Buhen and in Lower Nubia

- Huy appear with the Viceroy Heqanakht on a doorjamb in Buhen. The scene is damaged and the only visible title of Huy is that of fanbearer.
- Huy appears with the Mayor Pen-mehy on a lintel in Buhen
- A stela now in Berlin (17332) and originating in Lower Nubia shows Huy seated. He is receiving offerings the Draughtsman Khety, son of Paser. The text records many of his titles, and the fact that he traveled to Hatti to retrieve the "Chief Lady".
