= Temples of Wadi es-Sebua =

Coordinates: 22.7932°N 32.5453°E

UNESCO World Heritage Site
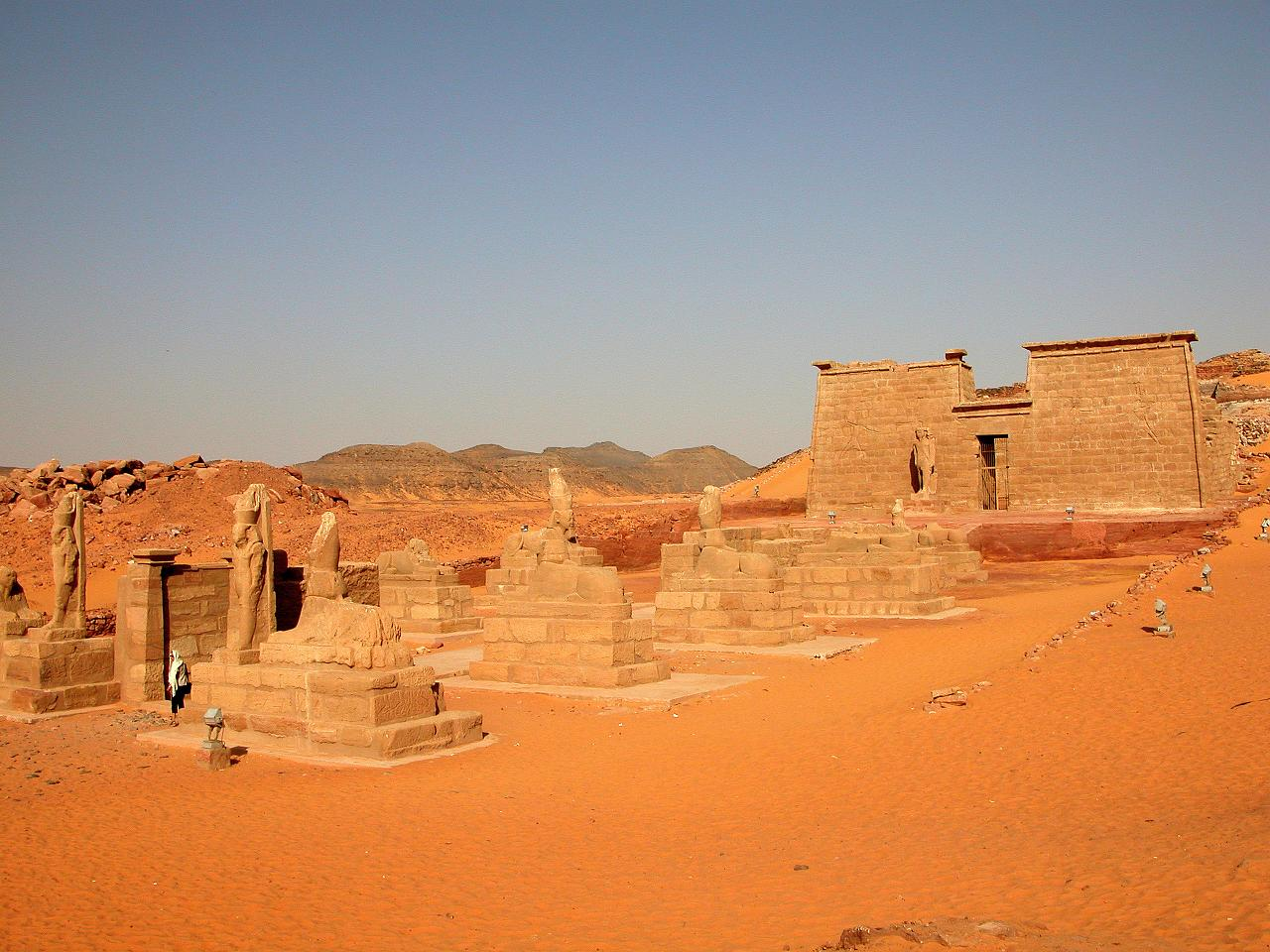
- A picture of Wadi es-Sebua temple
- Interactive map of Temples of Wadi es-Sebua
- Location: New Wadi es-Sebua, Egypt
- Part of: Nubian Monuments from Abu Simbel to Philae
- Criteria: Cultural: (i)(iii)(vi)
- Reference: 88
- Inscription: 1979 (3rd Session)

The Temples of Wadi es-Sebua are ancient temples in Lower Nubia associated with the reign of Ramesses II. The temples is significant for studying Egyptian religious architecture, royal authority, and Nubian administration during the Ramesside period. The English translation of the name Wadi es-Sebua is "Valley of the Lions." It is called this because of the sphinx-lined approach to the temple forecourts. The temples are a pair of New Kingdom Egyptian temples, including one speos temple constructed by the 19th Dynasty Pharaoh Ramesses II, in Lower Nubia. Built around 1279-1213 BCE. Research by Lynn M. Holden highlights the association between the temple of Ramesses II and Setau, the viceroy of Kush. This demonstrates the importance of this site's monuments for studying Egyptian officials and royal authorities.

It is also important to mention that the inscriptions, statues, stelae, and the architectural features of the temple can provide us with vital information about the people and institutions connected to this site. Such as Setau and Ramesses II. As part of the International Campaign to Save the Monuments of Nubia, along with Abu Simbel, Philae, Amada, and other Nubian archaeological sites, the temples at Wadi es-Sebua were relocated in the 1960s and inscribed on the UNESCOWorld Heritage List in 1979. The reason for the relocation of the temples was the construction of the Aswan High Dam. It threatened to flood the temple/site with water coming from Lake Nasser. The temple was dismantled in 1964 with U.S. support by the Egyptian Antiquities Service. They were moved to a new site only 4 km west of their original location.

== Religious and political importance ==
The temple has evidence of religious practices, and it can be investigated through the votive stelae, inscriptions, and other archaeological evidence associated with the temple. Excell's research examines 15 stelae associated with this site, using their inscription, imagery, and information about the individuals represented to explore religious practices and their social identity during the Ramesside period. Archaeological documentation published by Barsanti and Gauthier also provides additional evidence from the inscriptions, showing which deities they worshipped at this site and how these individuals expressed their religion. To know what ceremonies and rituals were performed at these temples requires more research.

The Temples of Wadi es-Sebua hold political importance because they were connected to Egyptian royal authority and administration in Nubia during the reign of Ramesses II. Lynn M. Holden's research on Setau, the Viceroy of Kush, identifies approximately 41 objects that are associated with him at the temple of Ramesses II. Including statues, architectural elements, and stelae. These monuments demonstrate the relationship between important Egyptian officials, royal authority, and the temple. Barsanti and Gauthier's archaeological work gives us evidence through the inscriptions and monuments connecting with Ramesses II and other officials involved in the administration in Nubia. Additionally, A reading of Benoit Lursons's examination of the modifications to the temple inscriptions provides evidence of its historical development under Ramesses II.

== First temple of Amenhotep III ==
The first temple was built by the 18th Dynasty Pharaoh Amenhotep III and subsequently restored by Ramesses II. Before the construction of the larger temple of Ramesses II, this was the temple that was constructed. In the Temple's first stages, this temple consisted of a rock-cut sanctuary (about 3 m by 2 m) fronted by a brick-built pylon, a court, and a hall, partly painted with wall paintings." The religious decorations that are located in the temple depict Amenhotep III presenting offerings before the god Amun. The art that is shown in this temple also depicts a lot more for Amun, not just offerings but worship as well. During the Amarna Period, images of Amun were attacked, and the decorations deteriorated, but Ramesses II later restored and extended Amenhotep III's temple by building structures in front of the pylon. The temple is located approximately 200 meters south of the Ramesses II temple. During the reign of Ramesses II, the earliest form of the temple was restored and modified. The Archaeological evidence includes changes to the building, inscriptions, and the decorations mentioned as earlier. This tells us that the site continued to develop and improve under different pharaohs. The temple was eventually submerged by the rising waters of Lake Nasser following the construction of the Aswan High Dam in the 1960s. Most of the panels of wall paintings were removed in 1964 and transferred to the Egyptian Museum in Cairo.

== The temple of Amun of Ramesses II ==
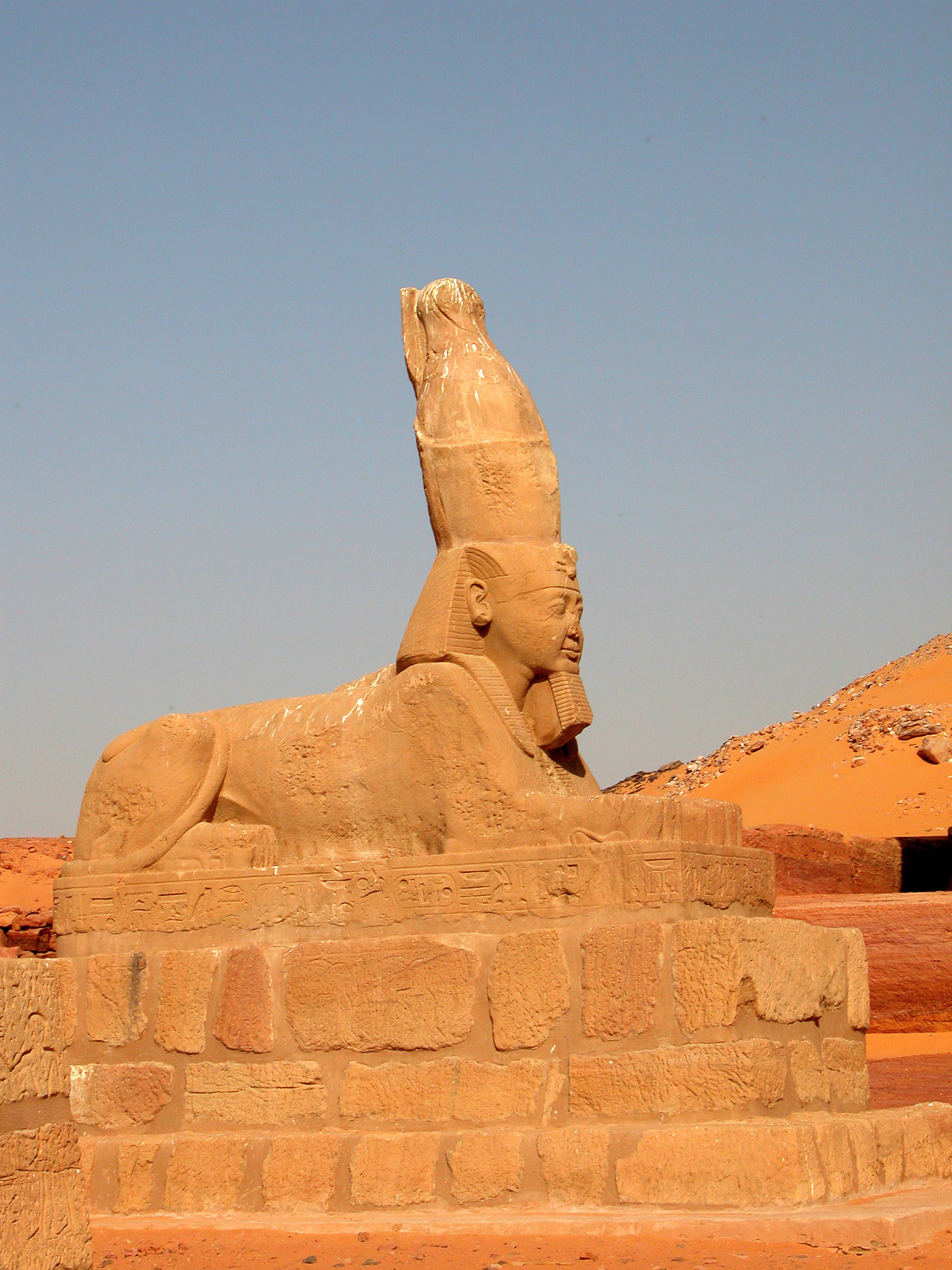
Sphinx of Ramesses II from his Wadi es-Sebua temple

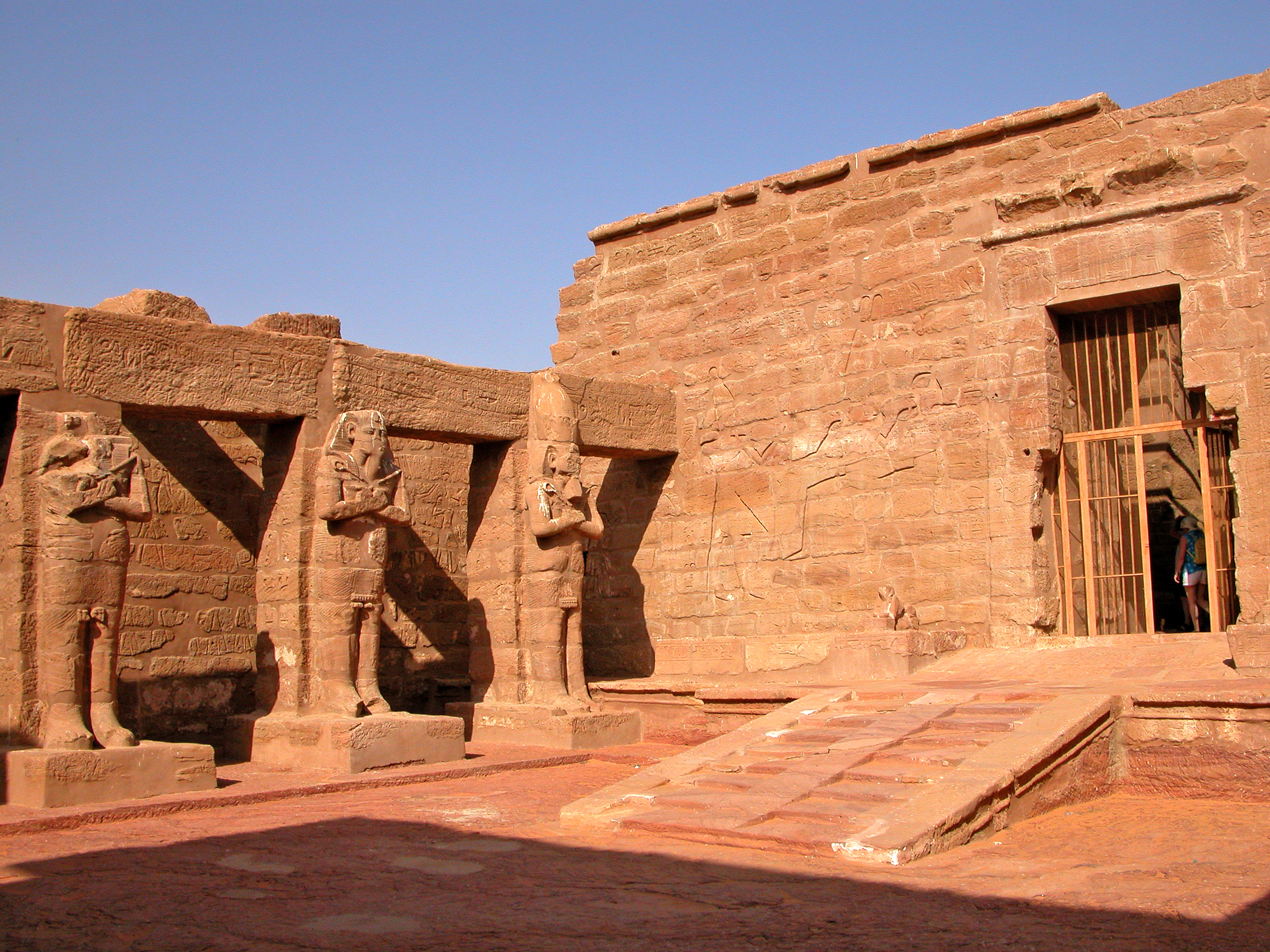
The forecourt of Wadi es-Sebua

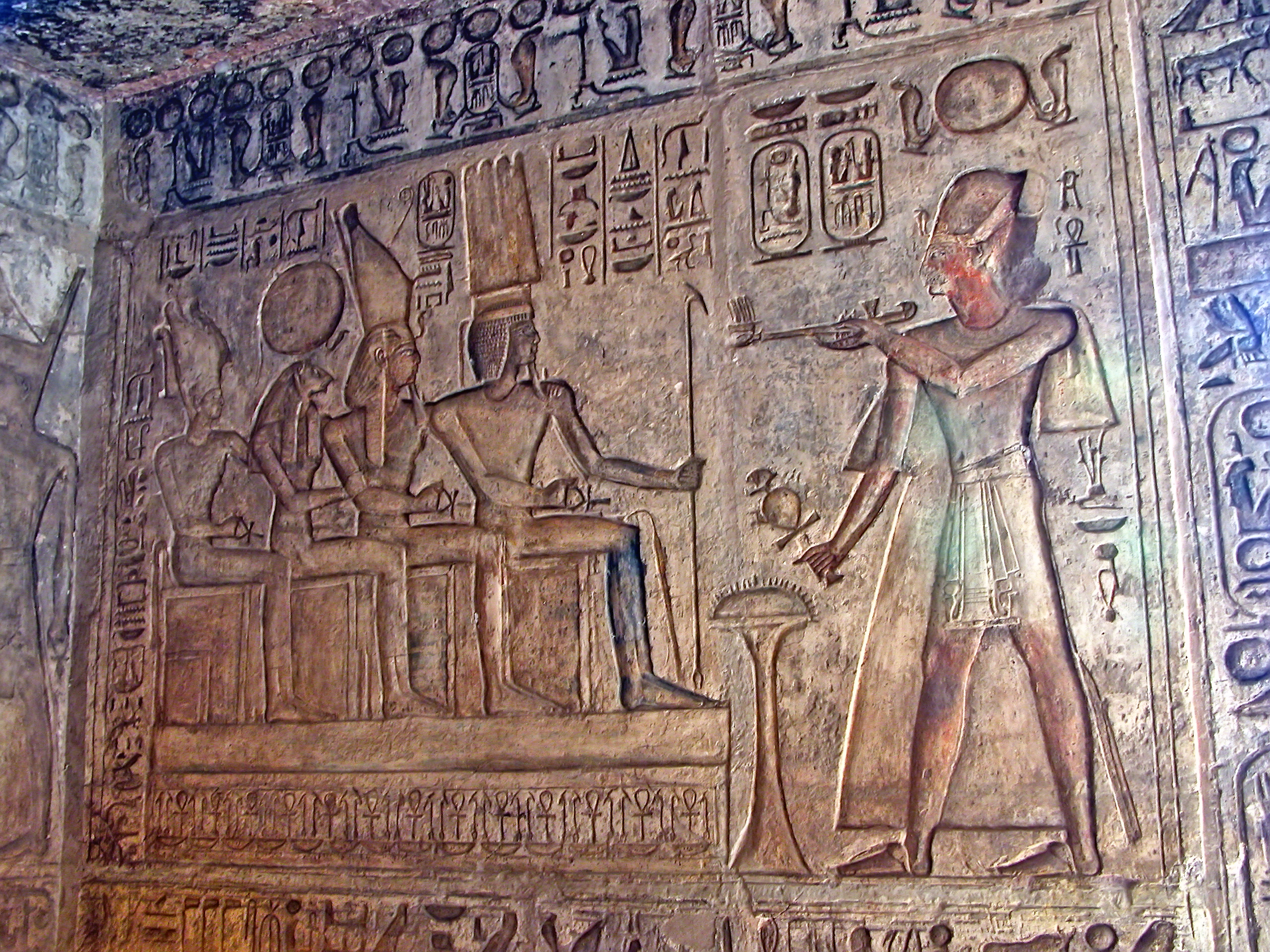
Relief of Ramesses II presenting an offering to the gods at Wadi es-Sebua

The second larger temple, which was built at [Wadi es-sebua] el-Sebua, was known as "The Temple of Ri'amesse-meryamun [Ramesses II] in the Domain of Amun" and was constructed roughly 150m northeast of Amenhotep III's temple. [ Ramesses ll, known as Ramesses the Great, was an Egyptian pharaoh of the 19th dynasty. His connection to the temple of Wadi es-Sebua showed how much connection he had with religion, royal authority, and how much the Egyptian administration was connected in Nubia.]Contemporary monuments and representations of the viceroy of Kush, Setau, indicate that this temple was set up between Years 35 and Year 50 of Ramesses II. Setau is known to have served as the Viceroy of Kush or Nubia between Years 38 and 63 of this pharaoh's reign and was responsible for Ramesses' later Nubian temples. The temple of Wadi es-Sebua was the third sanctuary or chapel constructed from rock with a forecourt built with stones that Ramesses II erected in Nubia. Located at approximately a hundred and fifty kilometers south of Aswan, on the western bank of the Nile, the temple owed its importance to the fact that during the Ramesside period, the city was built at the outlet of the caravan roads, was used as the place of residence for the viceroy of Kush, and was located at a difficult stretch of the Nile which was difficult for boats to traverse up against the current.

The temple of "Ramesses beloved of Amon in the field of Amun" was used as a quay or resting place for boats during their descent of the Nile River. The local Arabs, inspired by the stone sculptures of sphinxes which lined the entrance to the first temple, baptized the place as 'Wadi es-Sebua' or the Valley of the Lions. The temple comprised three distinct parts: two open courts which were decorated with sphinxes or dromos, a large interior court with Osiride pillars, and the rock-hewn temple. This temple was, hence, "partly free-standing and partly rock-cut."

Ramesses II entrusted the management of his work projects here to the viceroy of Nubia, Setau, which, if one judges by the poor quality of the Osiride style and statues of the court, was forced to settle on an "untrained work force, many of whom were snatched from the Libyan oases" and by "inferior raw materials." The importance of this place with Ramesses II is within the temple itself, inscriptions, and the monuments rather than in royal tombs. The temple is dedicated to Ramesses II even through his reign, so we know that this is going to be the largest part of the temple. Lynn M. Holden says that 41 of the 100 objects in association with Setau came from Ramesses II. These included statues, architectural elements, and stelae. A high official like Setau being with Ramesses II shows how much Ramesses cared.

The temple once possessed three pylons. The first two, however, were made of inferior Nile mud brick and have since crumbled. Only the stone gate passageway through them has survived. Beyond the first tower, the first courtyard appears with two human headed sphinxes accompanied by two statues of the pharaoh himself, which originally stood on both sides of the passageway. Only the left-hand statue of Ramesses II remains in situ, whereas the other statue now lies in the desert.

== Archaeological history ==
The findings at Wadi es-Sebua provide important information about how the site's temples were uncovered, documented, and studied for the purpose of understanding everything about this place. The larger temple of Ramesses II was excavated beginning in 1909 by Alexandre Barsanti, while the smaller temple, originally constructed during the reign of Amenhotep III, was documented in separate archaeological investigations. One important early record is Cecil M. Firth's The Archaeological Survey of Nubia: Report for 1910-1911 (1927). Firth's report includes descriptions, photographs, and plans of the smaller temple at Wadi es-Sebua. Plate 3 documents the temple of Amenhotep III and the mud-brick additions made under Ramesses II's reign. It also records the limestone entrance jambs and the bases of two sandstone statues of Ramesses II that stood in front of the entrance. Other plates that were documented were ones of painted decorations, including scenes of Amenhotep III and Queen Tiye, as well as images of the king making offerings to Amun inside the sanctuary (Firth 1927, 234-236). These records are valuable because they preserve details of the temple's architecture and decorations and show how the earlier structure was modified during Ramesses II's reign.

More archaeological documentation was published by Walter B. Emery and L. P. Kirwan in The Excavations and Survey between Wadi es-Sebua and Adindan, 1929-1931 (1935). This multi-volume publication by them shows us the documents of archaeological excavations and survey work carried out across the region between Wadi es-Sebua and Adindan. Its text and accompanying plates provide a broader record of archaeological investigation. This publication should be used primarily for the regional survey rather than as the original excavation report for the temples themselves. It adds more important context to the history of archaeological research in the area. With the earlier documentation by Barsanti and Gauthier and Firth's, these investigations of the smaller temple provide evidence of how archaeologists recorded he monuments, architecture, inscriptions, and other remains of Wadi es- Sebua. This also shows us how important it is to document Nubian archaeological sites and the land around them.

== Conversion into church ==
After Nubia's conversion to Christianity in the 6th century AD, the hypostyle hall of the temple was converted into a church. It was adapted for Christian worship. Rather than Christians constructing lots of religious buildings, they reused the ones that were left behind and only changed the interior to make it a church. The temple's original religious imagery was covered with plaster, allowing Christians to make paintings and symbols on the walls of the church. These additional changes include the representation of Christian figures like saints. To demonstrate how the building was adapted to serve a different religious tradition. One example of this transformation would be the images of Saint Peter in the temple's sanctuary. In the original Egyptian decoration, Ramesses II was shown presenting flowers to Egyptian dieties. During Christian reuse of the temple, the gods in the scene were replaced by an image of Saint Peter holding a key. As a result, the original image of the Pharaoh's meaning was changed into something new. The Christians gave it the meaning of Ramesses II appearing to present his offering to Saint Peter. This just shows us how much Christian worshippers used the existing Egyptian religious image in their own setting rather than erasing the earlier decoration.

Gallery

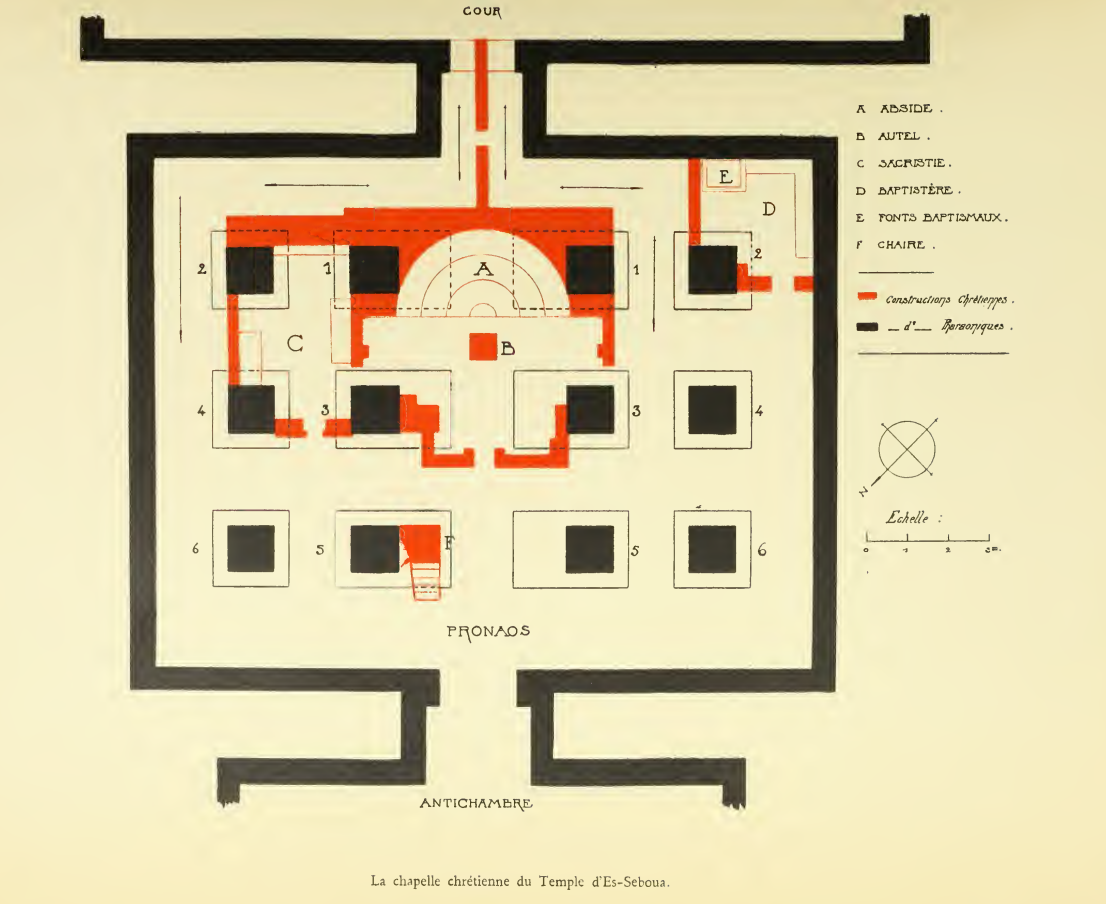
Plan of the Christian church (red) inside the temple

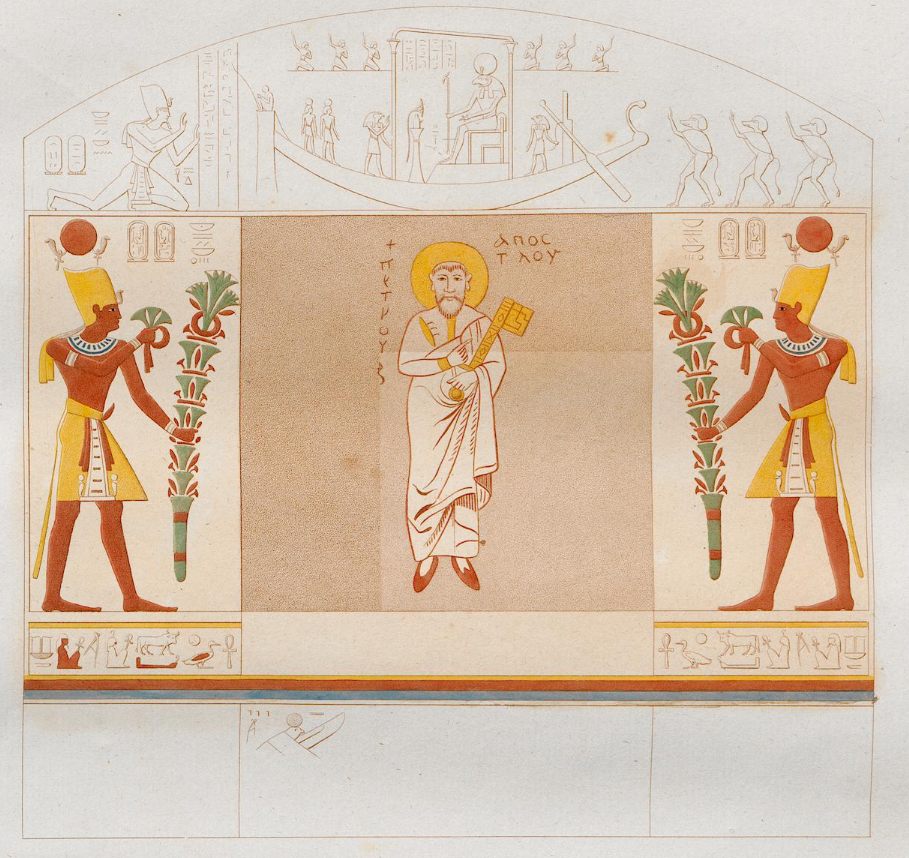
Painting of St. Peter (late 7th or early 8th century), as drawn in 1822

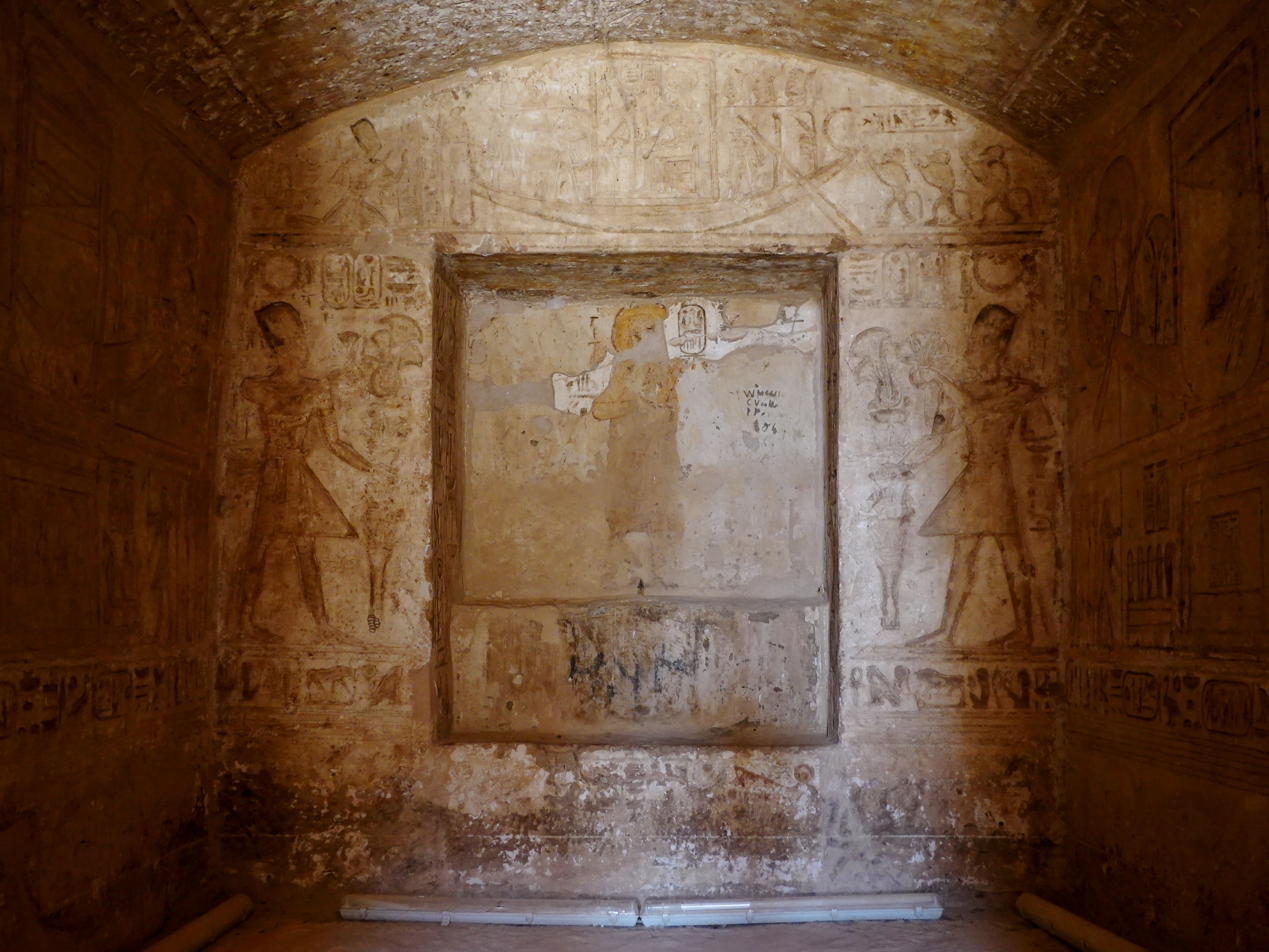
The same painting in 2019, having been damaged during the temple's relocation in the 1960s

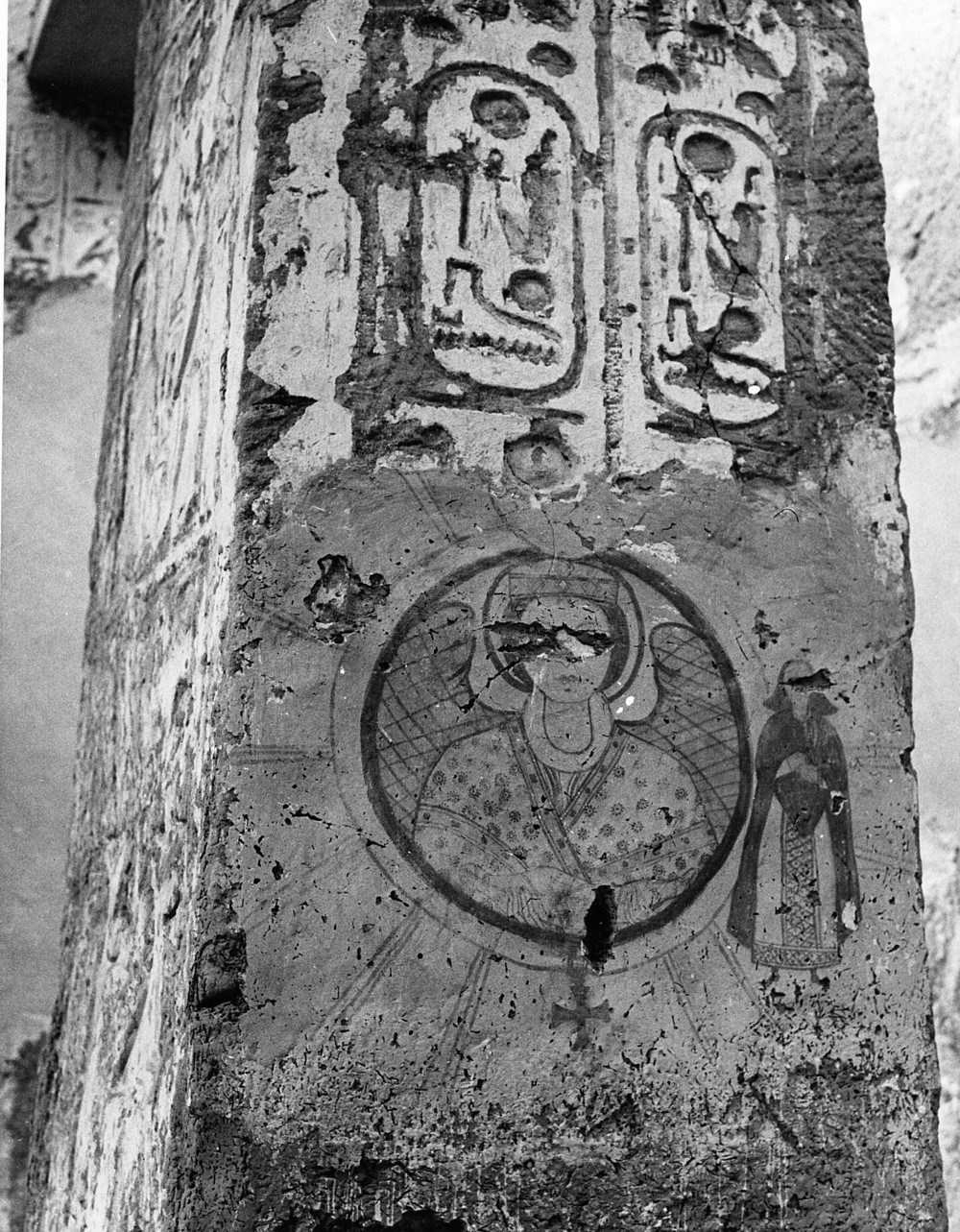
Painting of angel and unspecified person (donor?)

== See also ==
- List of ancient Egyptian sites

== Bibliography ==
1. ,Gauthier, Henri. Le temple d’Ouadi es-Sebouâ. Cairo: Imprimerie de l’Institut français d’archéologie orientale,The Temple of Wadi es-Sebua. Cairo: Printing Office of the French Institute of Oriental Archaeology, 1912 https://dn760009.eu.archive.org/0/items/letempledeouadie01gaut/letempledeouadie01gaut.pdf
2. Holden, Lynn M. Self-Presentation in Ramessid Egypt. Doctoral dissertation, University of Oxford, 2012. https://ora.ox.ac.uk/objects/uuid:2a5f2c4c-ac92-45f9-b7d7-e17df6eb6dfa/files/m1c1f69fcd48dba36be4a39358d4b4a3b
3. Exell, Karen. A Social and Historical Interpretation of Ramesside Period Votive Stelae. PhD diss., Durham University, 2006https://etheses.durham.ac.uk/id/eprint/2631/
4. Lurson, Benoît. “Remarques sur les modifications apportées aux inscriptions dans la salle N du temple de Ouadi es-Seboua.” Res Antiquitatis: Journal of Ancient History 1 (2010): 107–133.
5. Ullmann, Martina. “The Temple of Amenhotep III at Wadi es-Sebua.” In Proceedings of the 12th International Congress of Egyptologists, edited by Ola El-Aguizy and Burt Kasparian, 503–509. Cairo: Bibliothèque générale, vol. 71, 2023. https://doi.org/10.11588/propylaeumdok.00006381
6. Firth, Cecil M. The Archaeological Survey of Nubia: Report for 1910–1911. Cairo: Government Press, 1927.
7. Emery, Walter B., and L. P. Kirwan. The Excavations and Survey between Wadi es-Sebua and Adindan, 1929–1931. 2 vols. Cairo: Government Press, 1935.
8. Van Loon, Gertrud J. M., and Dobrochna Zielińska. “Le temple du Ouadi es-Seboua: Les implantations chrétiennes.” In Études coptes XVII: Dix-neuvième journée d’études (Ottawa, 19–22 juin 2019), edited by Anne Boud’hors, Jitse H. F. Dijkstra, and Esther Garel, 97–121. Cahiers de la Bibliothèque copte 24. Paris: De Boccard, 2022. https://doi.org/10.5281/zenodo.8139745
