= Anhotep =

Ancient Egyptian official, viceroy of Kush

- Viceroy of Kush
- Predecessor: Setau?
- Successor: Mernudjem?
- Dynasty: 19th Dynasty
- Pharaoh: Ramesses II
- Burial: TT300 in Thebes
- Spouse: Hunuro

Anhotep was Viceroy of Kush, Governor of the South Lands, Scribe of the Tables of the Two Lands during the reign of Ramesses II. His wife was named Hunuro. Anhotep's tomb is TT300 in Dra' Abu el-Naga.

A shabti inscribed for Anhotep, King's Son of Kush was found in Thebes. The shabti is made of blue faience and is in the collection of the Metropolitan Museum. The name was either changed due to a mistake in the text, or it may have replaced another name.
