= Temple of Gerf Hussein =

Archaeological site in Egypt

Coordinates: 23.2833°N 32.9000°E

Gerf Hussein
- Per Ptah
- Location within Egypt
- Type: Temple
- Periods: Nineteenth Dynasty of Egypt
- Location: New Kalabsha

History
- Built by: Setau

Site notes
- Condition: Partially reconstructed, some submerged

The temple of Gerf Hussein (in Ancient Egypt: Per Ptah, or 'House of Ptah') was dedicated to pharaoh Ramesses II and built by the Setau, Viceroy of Nubia. Situated on a bank of the Nile some 90 km south of Aswan, it was partly free-standing and partly cut from the rock. It was dedicated to "Ptah, Ptah-Tatenen and Hathor, and associated with Ramesses, 'the Great God.'"

During the building of the Aswan dam project in the 1960s, as part of the International Campaign to Save the Monuments of Nubia, sections of the free-standing portion of this temple were dismantled and they have now been reconstructed at the site of New Kalabsha. Most of the rock cut temple was left in place and is now submerged beneath the waters of the Nile.

An avenue of ram-headed sphinxes led from the Nile to the first pylon, which like the courtyard beyond is also free standing. The courtyard is surrounded by six columns and eight statue pillars. The entrance to a peristyle court "is decorated with colossal Osiris statues." The rear portion of the building which is 43 m in depth was carved out of rock and follows the structure of Abu Simbel with a pillared hall featuring two rows of three statue pillars and four statue recesses, each with divine triads along the sides. Beyond the hall lay the hall of the offering table and the barque chamber with four cult statues of Ptah, Ramesses, Ptah-Tatenen and Hathor carved out of the rock.

== Images ==
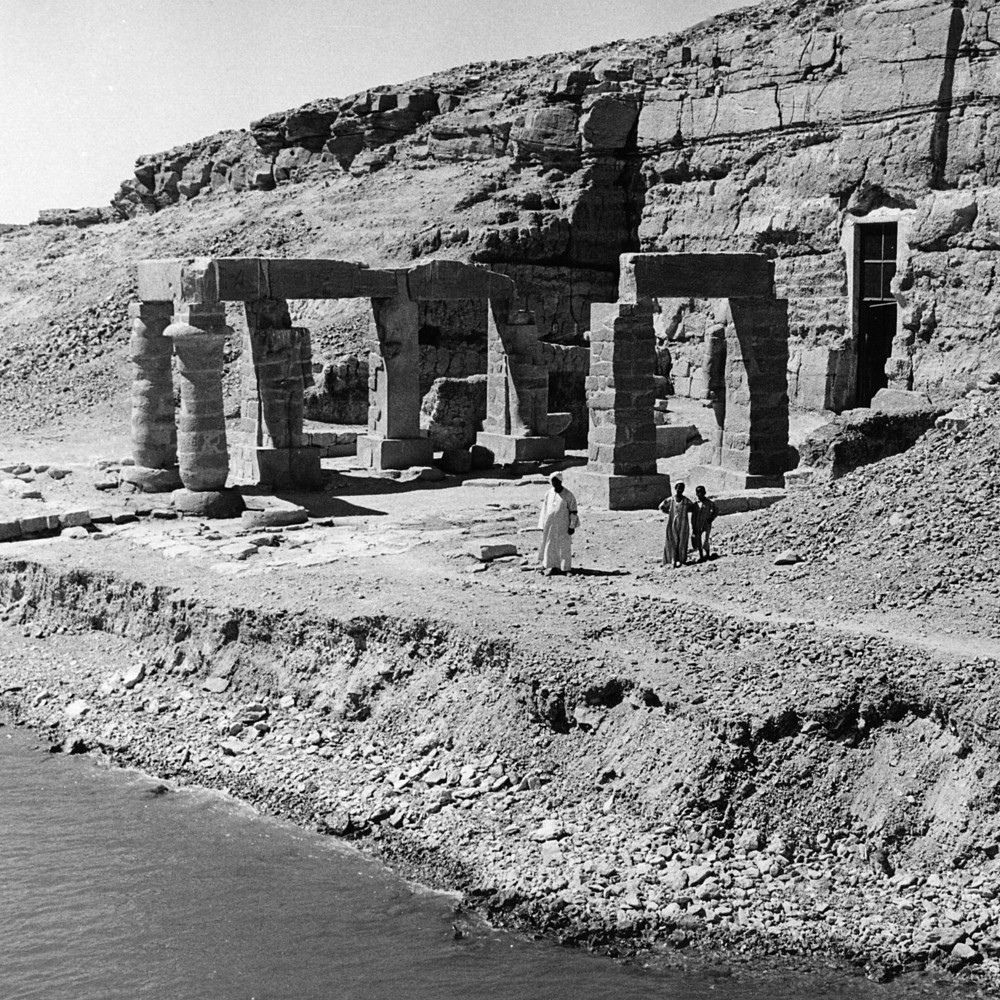
The Temple of Ptah seen from the Nile, 2 January 1960, UNESCO

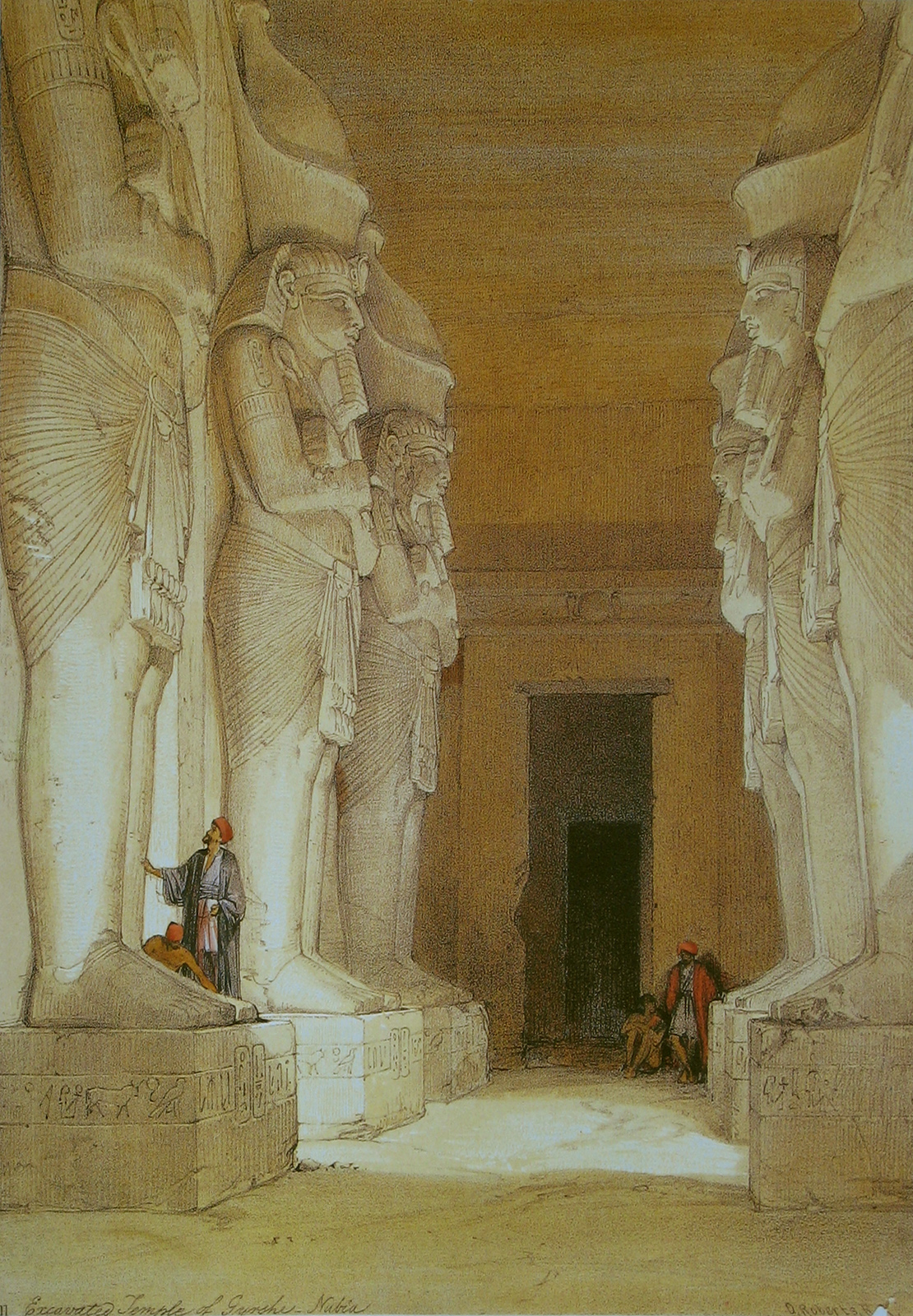
Painting inside the temple by David Roberts (1838)

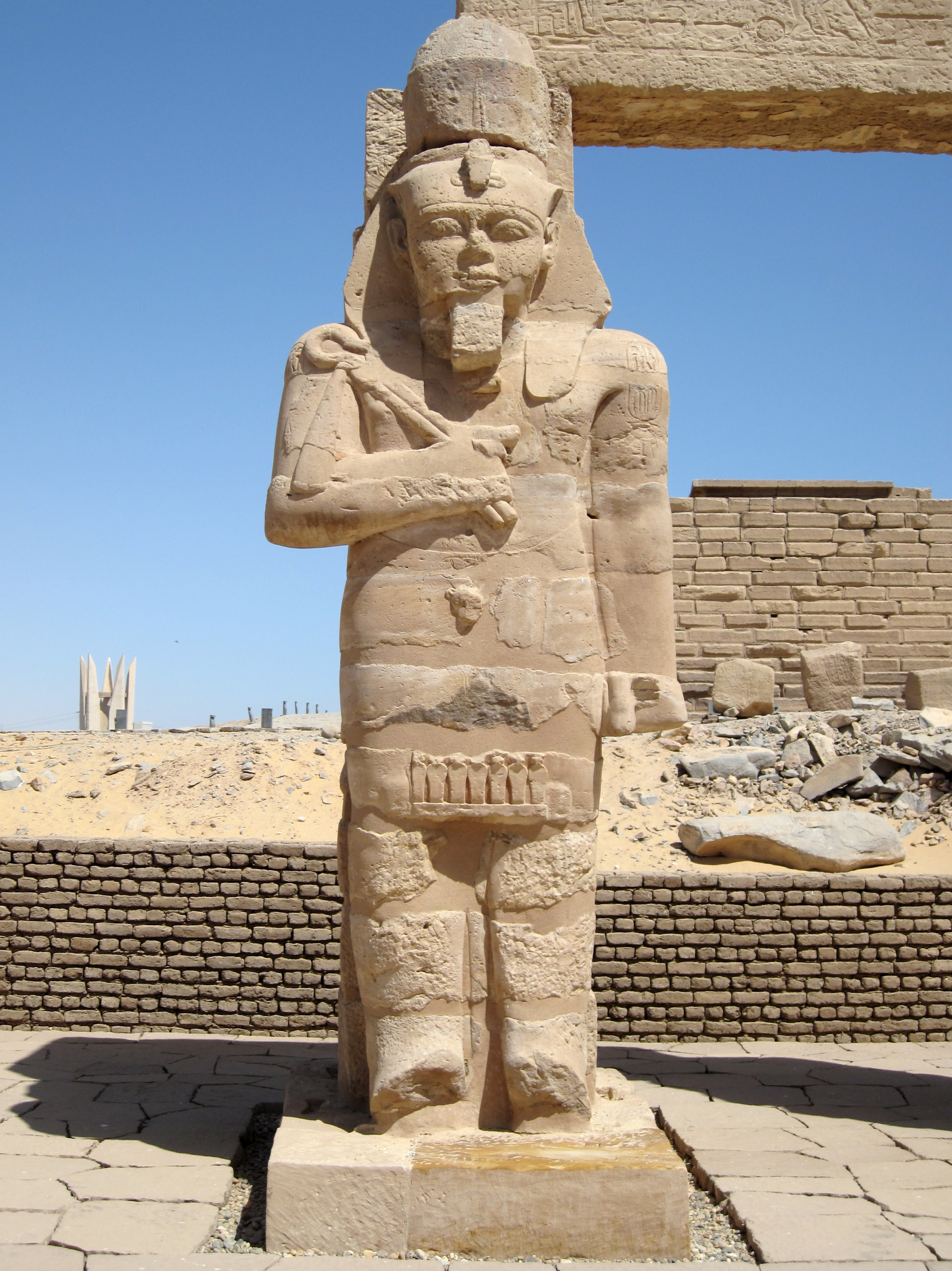
Somewhat "squat" statue of Ramesses II in the courtyard

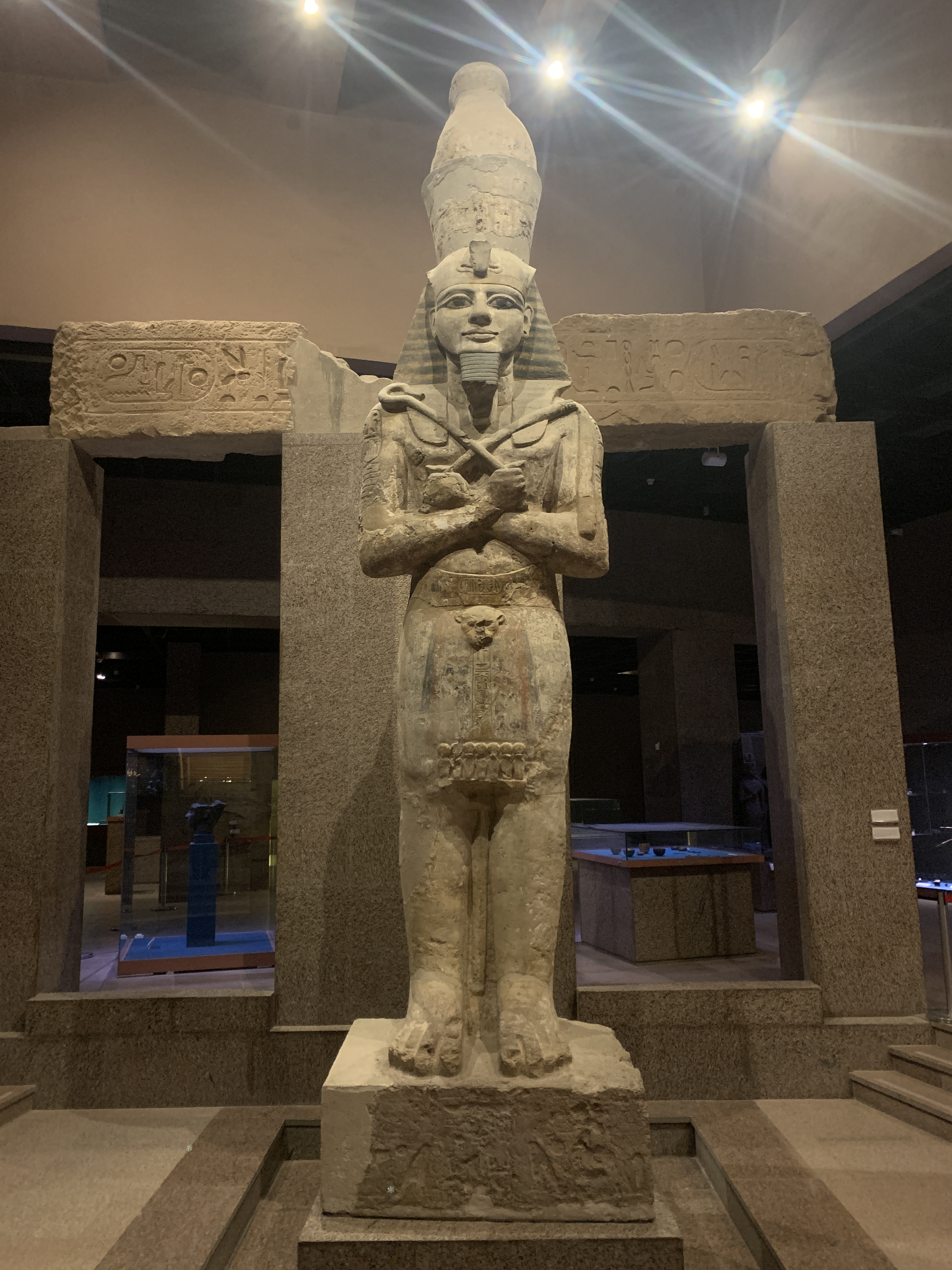
One of the statues from inside the rock cut temple, now at the Nubian Museum in Aswan

== See also ==
- List of ancient Egyptian sites, including sites of temples
