= Yuny (viceroy of Kush) =

- Viceroy of Kush
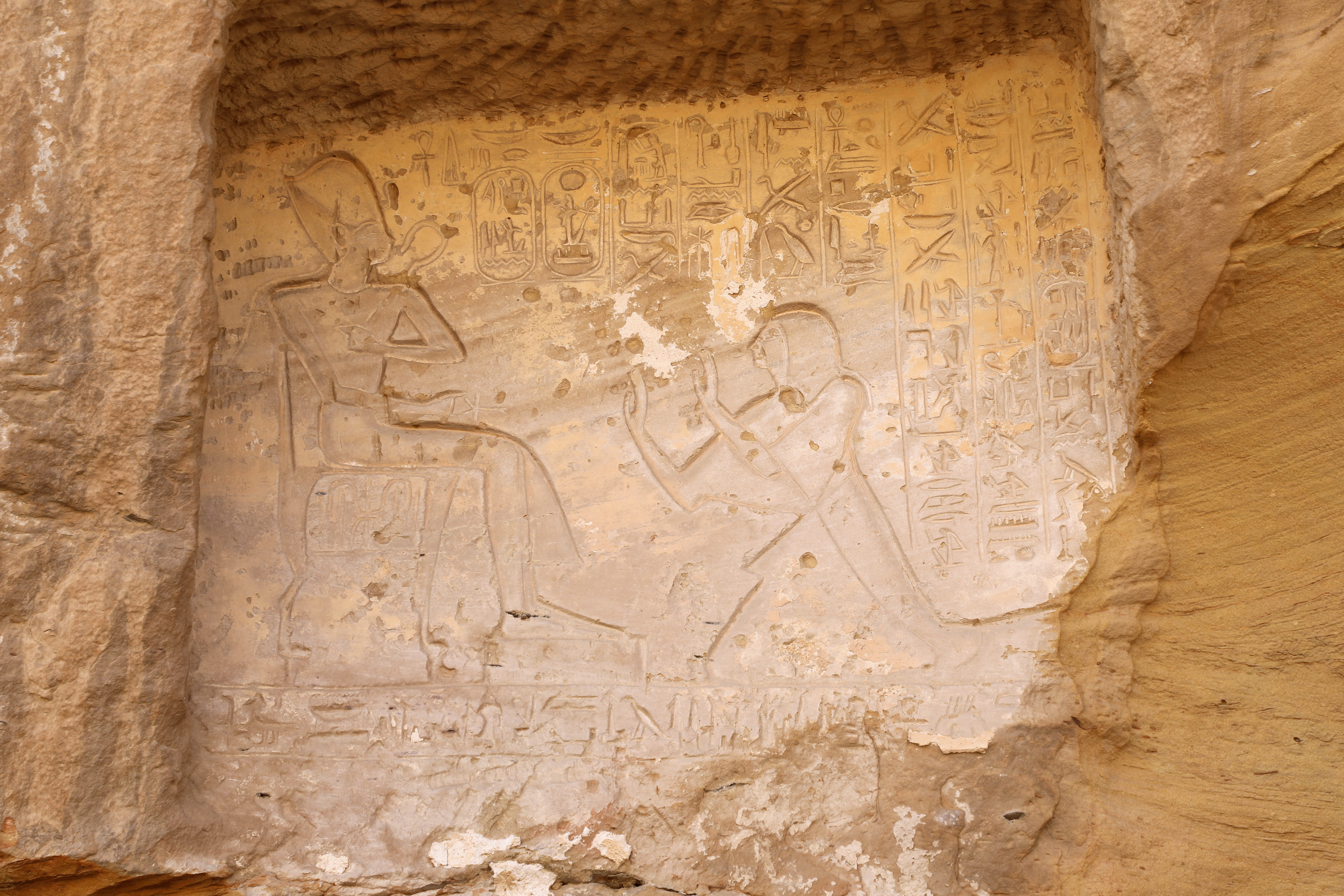
- Yuny kneeling before Seti I (stela at el-Kanaïs)
- Predecessor: Amenemopet
- Successor: Heqanakht
- Dynasty: 19th Dynasty
- Pharaoh: Seti I, Ramesses II

Yuni served as Head of the-stable-of-Seti-I, Charioteer of His Majesty, and Chief of the Medjay before becoming Viceroy during the reign of Seti I. He would use some of these titles simultaneously. On a stela from Abydos – now in the Cairo Museum (Jd'E 34620) – the inscription reads:

Made by the Superintendent of Deserts in the Southern Foreign country, Viceroy in Nubia (Ta-Sety), Chief of Works in the Estate of Amun, Chief of the Madjayu-militia, Iuny. (Kitchen)

Yuni started the Egyptian building projects at Amara West and Aksha. It was "on his orders that the first blocks of the Abu Simbel temples were cut. Yuny commemorated his work with a rock-cut scene showing himself standing before Ramesses II on the Abu Simbel cliff. After ten years under Ramesses II, Yuny retired from his post in Nubia. He was succeeded by Heqanakht.

== Monuments ==
- Abydos stela (Cairo JdE 34620) Yuny is shown adoring the Abydos Triad consisting of Osiris, Isis and Horus.
- Abu Simbel Rock Stela No.10 The Viceroy Yuny appears before Pharaoh Ramesses II, who is seated on a throne.
- Rock stela at al-Kanāʾis (el-Kanaïs) The Viceroy Yuny is kneeling before Pharaoh Seti I, who is seating on a throne.
