= Seni =

Ancient Egyptian official, Viceroy of Kush, Mayor of Thebes

- Viceroy of Kush
Egyptian name
sn A1 A51
- Predecessor: Ahmose called Turo
- Successor: Penre
- Dynasty: 18th Dynasty
- Pharaoh: Thutmosis I and Thutmosis II

Seni was an ancient Egyptian official with the titles king's son of Kush (Viceroy of Kush), overseer of the southern countries and mayor of the southern city (Thebes). He was in office under the kings Thutmosis I and Thutmosis II. As king's son of Kush he was the main official in charge of the Nubian provinces.

Seni is mainly known from the inscription on two doorjambs found at the Nubian fortress of Kumma, where his titles are listed including overseer of the double granary of Amun. The inscription is not dated, but there was found a biographical inscription at Semna where there is reported that an official was promoted by Thutmosis I to a king's son. The name of the person in the inscription is lost, but there also appears the title overseer of the double granary of Amun, indicating that this inscription might belong to Seni. His successor in office was Penre.
