= Heqanakht =

Ancient Egyptian official, Viceroy of Kush

- Viceroy of Kush
- Predecessor: Yuny
- Successor: Paser II
- Dynasty: 19th Dynasty
- Pharaoh: Ramesses II

Heqanakht was Viceroy of Kush during the reign of Ramesses II. His titles include: King's son of Kush, overseer of the Southern Lands, Fan-bearer on the Right Side of the King, Messenger to every land, Hereditary prince, royal sealbearer.

Heqanakht is attested in several locations:

1. Graffiti in Aswan – Heqanakht is shown adoring a cartouche of Ramesses II
2. A squatting statue from Quban – The base is inscribed with hetep di nesu offerings from the King to Atum and Osiris.
3. A reused block from Quban is inscribed with Heqanakht's name
4. In the temple at Amada Heqanakht is shown praising Re-Harakhti
5. In a rock stela from Abu Simbel Heqanakht is shown adoring Queen Nefertari before offerings. The stela also depicts Ramesses II with the King's Daughter Meritamen
6. In Aksha the name of Heqanakht appears on a lintel from a building
7. In a stela from Serra Peniuy, chief of Tehkhet mentions a gift from Heqanakht
8. In Amarah Heqanakht is shown adoring Ramesses II
9. In Abri Heqanakht is shown giving praise to the Pharaoh on a lintel.
