= Penre =

- Viceroy of Kush
- Predecessor: Seni
- Successor: Inebny/Amenemnekhu
- Dynasty: 18th Dynasty
- Pharaoh: Hatshepsut

Penre was an ancient Egyptian official of the New Kingdom, in office under the ruling queen Hatshepsut (about 1508–1458 BC). Penre was viceroy of Kush. The writing of his name varies on the monuments between Penre (Panre), Pare and Payre. Because of his high titles, he was one of the most important officials at the royal court, ruling the Nubian provinces. Kush is the Ancient Egyptian name for Nubia.

Penre was little known till his tomb at Thebes was recently excavated by a Hungarian mission. On the canopic jars found in the tomb bears the titles first king's son (= viceroy) and overseer of the southern foreign countries. Otherwise he is also known from several statue fragments. His father was called Sekheru, who also bore the title king's son. Penre was in office between the reigning year 2 of Hatshepsut, when a certain Seni was still in office, and year 18, when Inebny/Amenemnekhu is attested in that office. None of his monuments are dated, but one of his statues found in Nubia, must have been installed before the sole reign of Thutsmosis III. His burial took the form of a shaft tomb, and little remains from the mud brick tomb chapel. The shaft was over 11 meters deep. Within the burial chamber at the bottom of the shaft, the human remains of three adults and two children were discovered. Various objects from the burial equipment have survived, bearing the names Sennefer, Siamun, and Penre.The fragments of the four canopic jars were still bearing Penre's name and titles. Items in the tomb include specifically prepared funerary items, objects of daily life, professional equipment and containers of provisions.
