= Paser II =

Ancient Egyptian official, Viceroy of Kush

- Viceroy of Kush
- Predecessor: Heqanakht
- Successor: Huy
- Dynasty: 19th Dynasty
- Pharaoh: Ramesses II
- Father: Minmose, High Priest of Min and Isis

in Ancient Egypt, Paser II was the son of the High Priest of Min and Isis named Minmose. Paser came from a very well-connected family. One uncle was the High Priest of Amun Wennenefer and another uncle was the troop commander of Kush named Pennesuttawy. Through Wennenefer, Paser was related to Amenemone (troop commander of the army), Amenemope (Chief of Seers in the house of Re and chamberlain to the pharaoh) and Hori, the High Priest of Anhur.

Paser's titles include: King's son of Kush, overseer of the Southern Lands, and king's scribe.

Paser is attested in:

- A statue from Abu Simbel
- A donation stela from Abu Simbel. Paser appears before Amun in one of the scenes. The stela is a record of a donation of land from Kha, son of Seba, to Amun.
- Rock Stelae in Abu Simbel. Three different stelae depict the Viceroy Paser.
