= Temple of Amada =

Coordinates: 22.73115°N 32.26261°E

Amada
UNESCO World Heritage Site
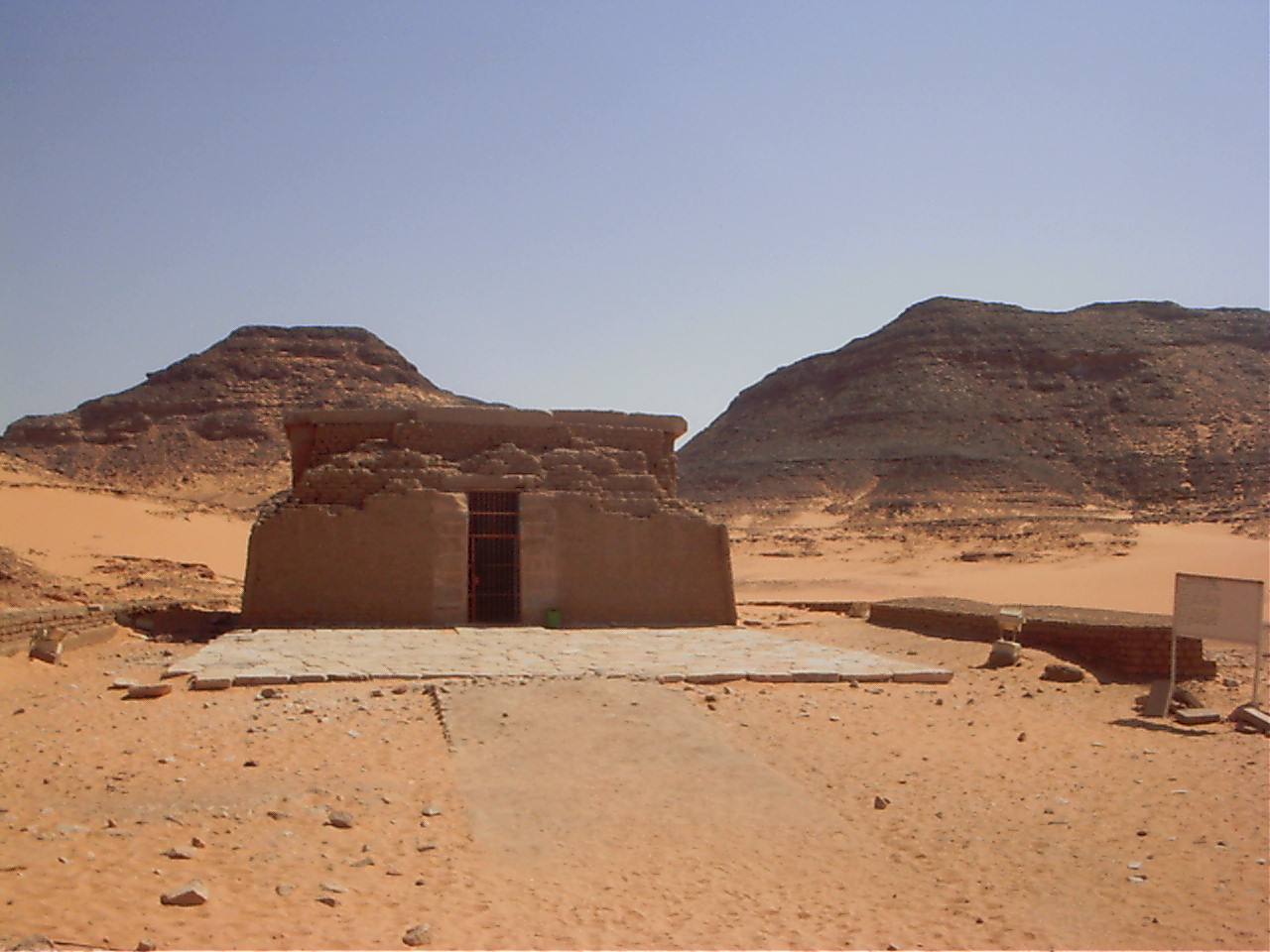
- The facade of Amada temple
- Interactive map of Amada
- Location: New Amada, Egypt
- Part of: Nubian Monuments from Abu Simbel to Philae
- Criteria: Cultural: (i)(iii)(vi)
- Reference: 88
- Inscription: 1979 (3rd Session)

The Temple of Amada, is one of the oldest Egyptian Temples in Nubia. It was constructed during the 18th Dynasty (c. 1550–1295 BC) by Pharaoh Thutmose III. It is one of the oldest Egyptian buildings still present along Lake Nasser. In total, three generations contributed to building the temple (Thutmose III, Amenhotep II, and Thutmose IV). Minor modifications continued into the 19th Dynasty (1295–1186 BC). The temple was dedicated to Amun-Ra and Horakhty-Ra.

During the Amarna period, Akhenaten had the name Amun destroyed throughout the temple but this was later restored by Seti I of Egypt's 19th Dynasty. Various 19th Dynasty pharaohs, especially Seti I and Ramesses II, also "carried out minor restorations and added to the temple's decoration." The stelas of the Viceroys of Kush Setau, Heqanakht and Messuy and that of Chancellor Bay describe their building activities under Ramesses II, Merneptah and Siptah respectively. In the medieval period the temple was converted into a church.

As part of the International Campaign to Save the Monuments of Nubia, along with Abu Simbel, Philae and other Nubian archaeological sites, Amada was relocated between 1964 and 1965, to a new higher site. It was inscribed on the UNESCO World Heritage List in 1979. Over the years, the Amada Temple has undergone extensive restoration and preservation efforts to protect its invaluable heritage.

== Temple interior ==
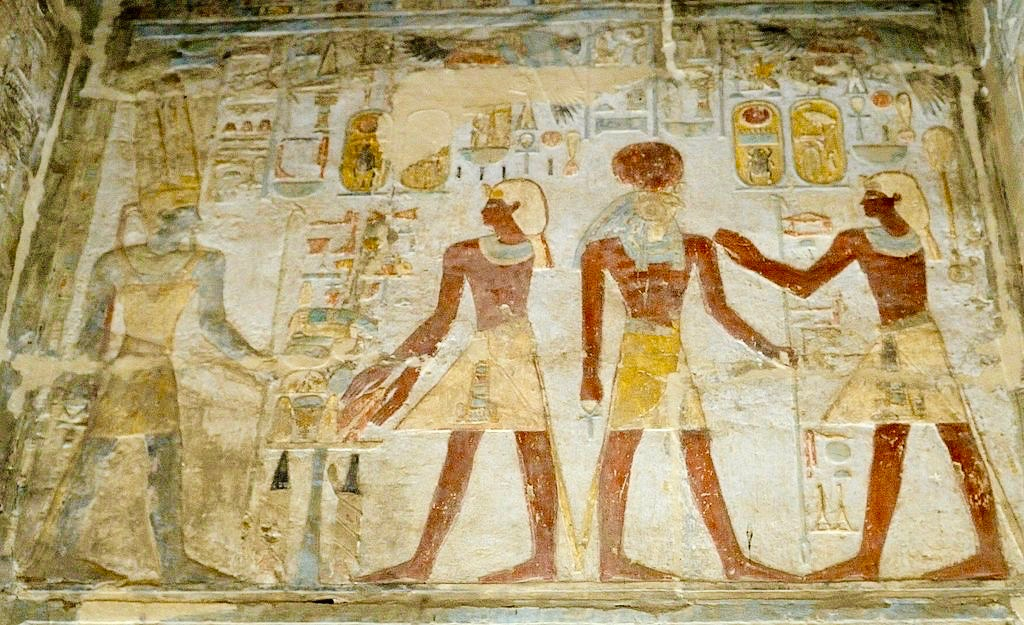
Relief of Thutmose III before the gods at Amada

The original building plan for the structure featured a pylon, forecourt and a portico which led to a sanctuary. However, when Thutmose IV put a roof over the open forecourt, the pillars and walls "were decorated with offering scenes, with those involving Thutmosis IV on the left" and Thutmose III and Amenhotep II on the right. The temple's decoration shows the king in temple ritual and in the company of a wide variety of deities. The reliefs and inscriptions within temple are extremely well preserved due to a layer of plaster covering them when the temple was converted into a church. Still visible today are inscriptions relating to the military exploits by Merenptah, the fourth pharaoh of the Nineteenth Dynasty, and Amenhotep II, the seventh pharaoh of the Eighteenth Dynasty .

The finest painted reliefs are in the innermost section of the temple where Thutmose III and Amenhotep II are shown being embraced or making offerings to various Egyptian gods. The left hand side of the vestibule shows Amenhotep II being crowned by Horus and Thoth and running with an oar and a hap (or navigational instrument). The cult room at the side of the sanctuary contains some interesting foundation and consecration scenes for the temple which depict "the ritual of the 'stretching of the cord', the ceremonial making and laying of bricks, and the offering of the temple to its gods." Although the temple has a dull and crumbling exterior, its interior features some of the most finely cut reliefs with bright and vibrant colors.

== Historical records ==
There are two important historical inscriptions from Amada temple. The earliest, dated to Year 3 of Amenhotep II, "is on a round topped stelae at the rear (eastern) wall of the sanctuary." Its text describes this pharaoh's ruthless military campaign in Asia:

His Majesty returned in joy to his father Amun after he had slain with his own mace the seven chiefs in the district of Takhesy (Syria) who were then hung upside down from the prow of the boat of His Majesty.

Amenhotep II goes on to describe how he hanged six of the dead chiefs "on the walls of Thebes" while the seventh was hung on the walls of Napata (a Nubian frontier city near the Fourth Cataract). This was done as a clear warning to the subject Nubians of the dangerous consequences of rebellion during Amenhotep's reign. The second historical text, "on a stela engraved on the left (northern) thickness of the entrance doorway" mentions the defeat of an invasion from Libya in Year 4 of Merneptah.

The temple was described by early travellers and first published by Henri Gauthier in 1913.

== Church ==
The temple was converted into a church presumably in the 6th century. The Christians plastered the hieroglyphs with Christian paintings that survived until the 19th century. Frederic Louis Norden described them as early 1738 as depicting "the Trinity, the apostles, and divers (sic.) other saints". Franz Christian Gau painted what remained of them in 1822. Already a few years later, in 1830, Jean-Jacques Rifaud and Johann Matthias Neurohr proposed to tear the Christian paintings down to access the ancient Egyptian art beneath. They were destroyed soon after.

== Relocation ==
Following the Egyptian revolution of 1952 the new Egyptian regime began planning the construction of the Aswan High Dam at the Nile's first cataract (shallow rapids). The building of the dam was to result in the creation of Lake Nasser, which would submerge the banks of the Nile along its entire 479 km (298 mi) length south of the dam – flooding the entire area of historical Lower Nubia, a region that was home to 22 critical historical sites, including Amada.

After UNESCO formally launched a campaign on 8 March 1960 to save the Nubian monuments, a meeting held in Cairo of engineers and archaeologists in the early 1960s to discuss how to save Amada. Among the attendees was Christiane Desroches Noblecourt head of the Centre d'Étude et de Documentation sur l'Ancienne Égypte, (CEDAE) in English the Documentation and Study Centre for the History of the Art and Civilization of Ancient Egypt) which was based in Cairo and curator of Egyptian antiquities at the Louvre. Compared with the project already underway to save Kalabaha and later used at Abu Simbel which involved disassembling it into pieces and relocating it, this was not considered possible at Amada as this would severely damage its finely cut and vibrantly coloured delicate wall reliefs in its seven halls. After considerable debate the consensus formed that thought that it was useless to try to save the temple and instead it should be allow it to be flooded under the rising water of Lake Nasser.

Desroches-Noblecourt took exception to this view and after one person pointed out that there was not enough money available to investigate other options to save the temple, Desroches Noblecourt declared that “France would take charge of Temple of Amada! Immediately!” After an Egyptian participant at the meeting pointed out that France had already made a substantial financial commitment towards the campaign to save Abu Simbel, she said she would find the required additional funds. Desroches-Noblecourt likely also did this as a way to improve Franco-Egyptian relations, which had been poor since the Suez Crisis of 1956.

Upon her return to Paris she asked two engineers to find a means of saving the temple. They suggested transporting it in one piece on rails to a higher location. It was estimated that this would cost 32 million francs (equivalent at the time to US$6.2 million). With France having already pledged US$1 million to the saving of Abu Simbel and convinced that French financial officials would turn her down Desroches Noblecourt requested an interview with the French president Charles de Gaulle. Drenched in a rainstorm on the way to the appointment she arrived in soaking clothes and wet hair. Having been informed of the commitment she had made in the name of France, he rose from his desk upon her arrival and towering over the 5 feet (1.5 m) tall Egyptologist demanded, “Madame, how dare you say that France will save the temple, without authorization from my government?” Desroches Noblecourt replied, “And you General – did you demand the authorisation of Pétain’s government on June 18, 1940? No! You judged that the circumstances required you to take a stand. Well, that’s what I’ve done.” De Gaulle was initially dumbfounded before laughing and saying “You win!” He agreed that France would honour her promise.

With funding secured the façade was dismantled by the Egyptian Antiquities Service before French engineers took over responsibility for the reminder of the temple, a which was braced by steel bands running horizontality around the whole exterior as well as steel bands running vertically over the temple and a large plate i. After allowing for a thick footing four massive horizontal concrete beams were inserted under the temple and two steel bands run around the exterior to secure it in the vertical plane. It was then cut free from the rocky ground, and before on 12 December 1964 the sandstone structure began a journey on three railroad tracks up a steep incline to a location 65 metres (213 ft) higher. The temple was pushed by double-action jacks which are anchored on the rails and powered by two high pressure hydraulic pumps. After the temple had been moved forward to the maximum travel of the jacks they and the tracks were removed from behind and re-assembled in front. Travelling at a few feet a day it took 16 months to move the temple to its new location 2.6 kilometres (1.6 mi) away, called New Amada, which was on a cliff overlooking the lake.

The rock-cut Temple of Derr was also moved to the New Amada.

== Gallery ==
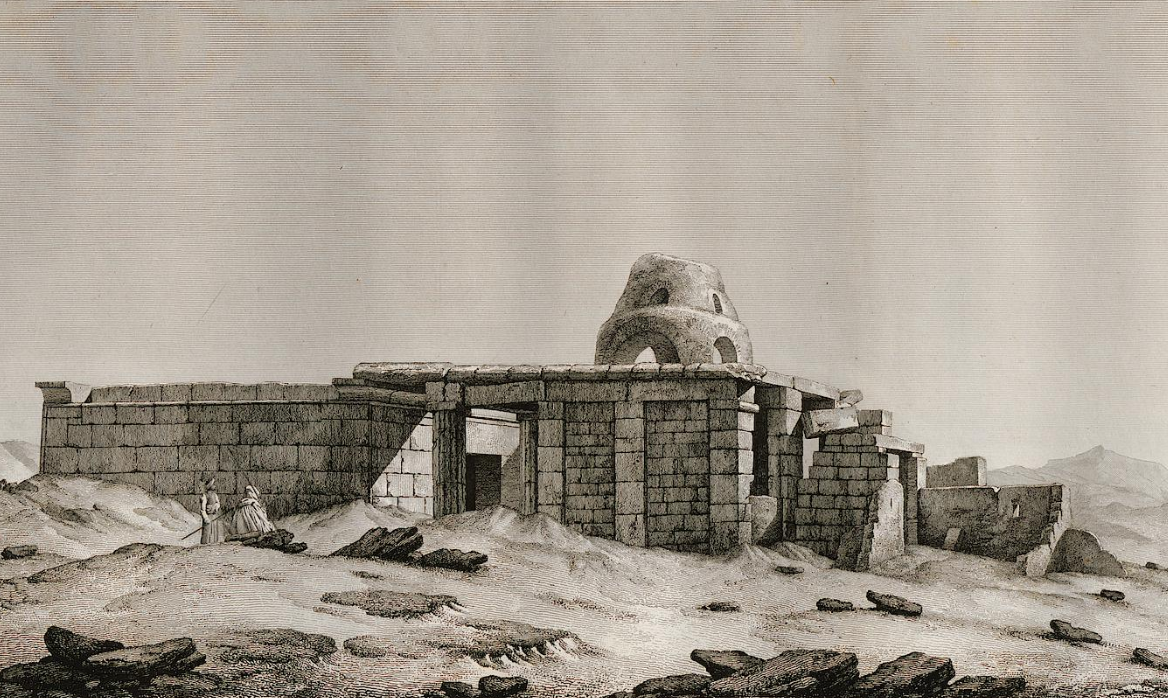
The Amada temple in 1822. At this date there still existed the early medieval dome which was built when the temple was converted into a church.

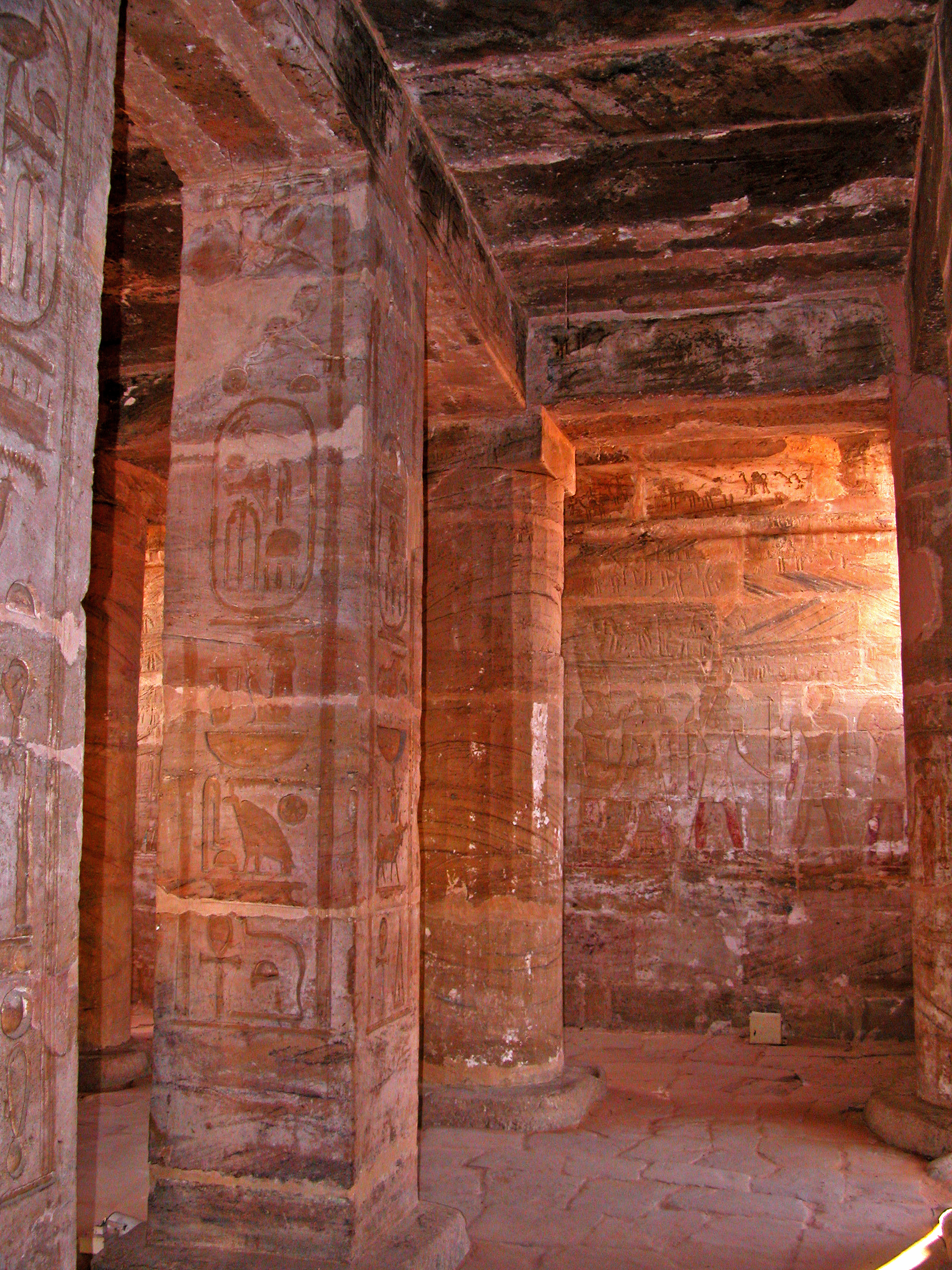
The interior of Amada temple

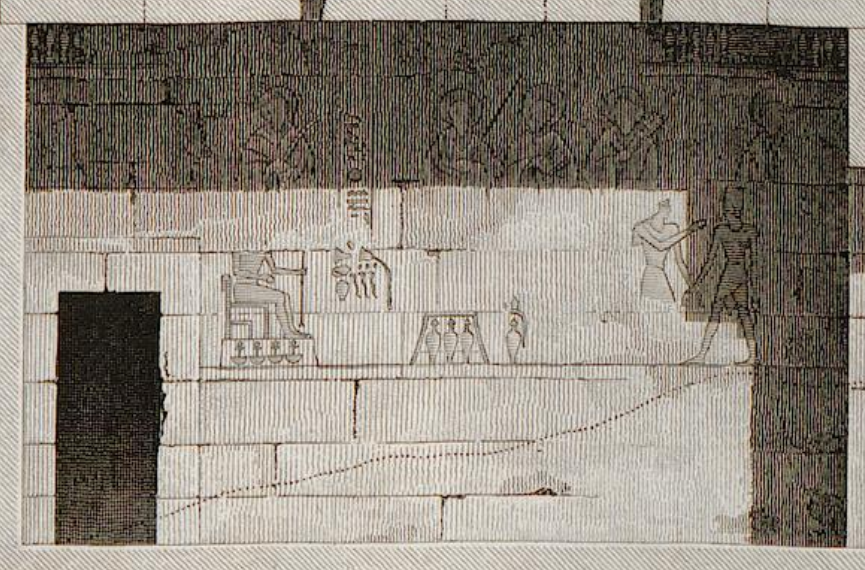
Remains of painted Christian saints plastered over the ancient reliefs.

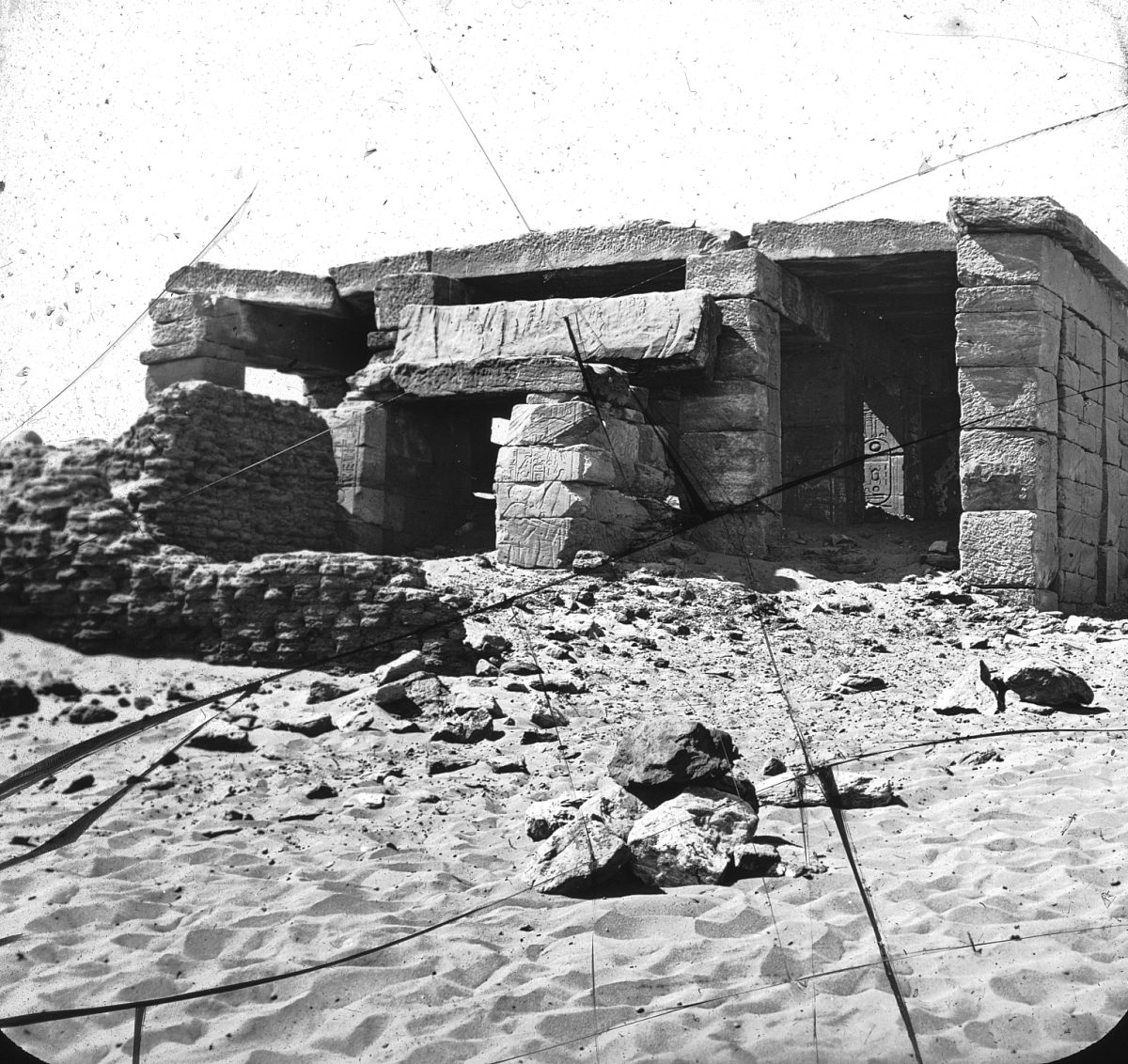
Egypt - Temple of Amada, Nubia. Brooklyn Museum Archives, Goodyear Archival Collection

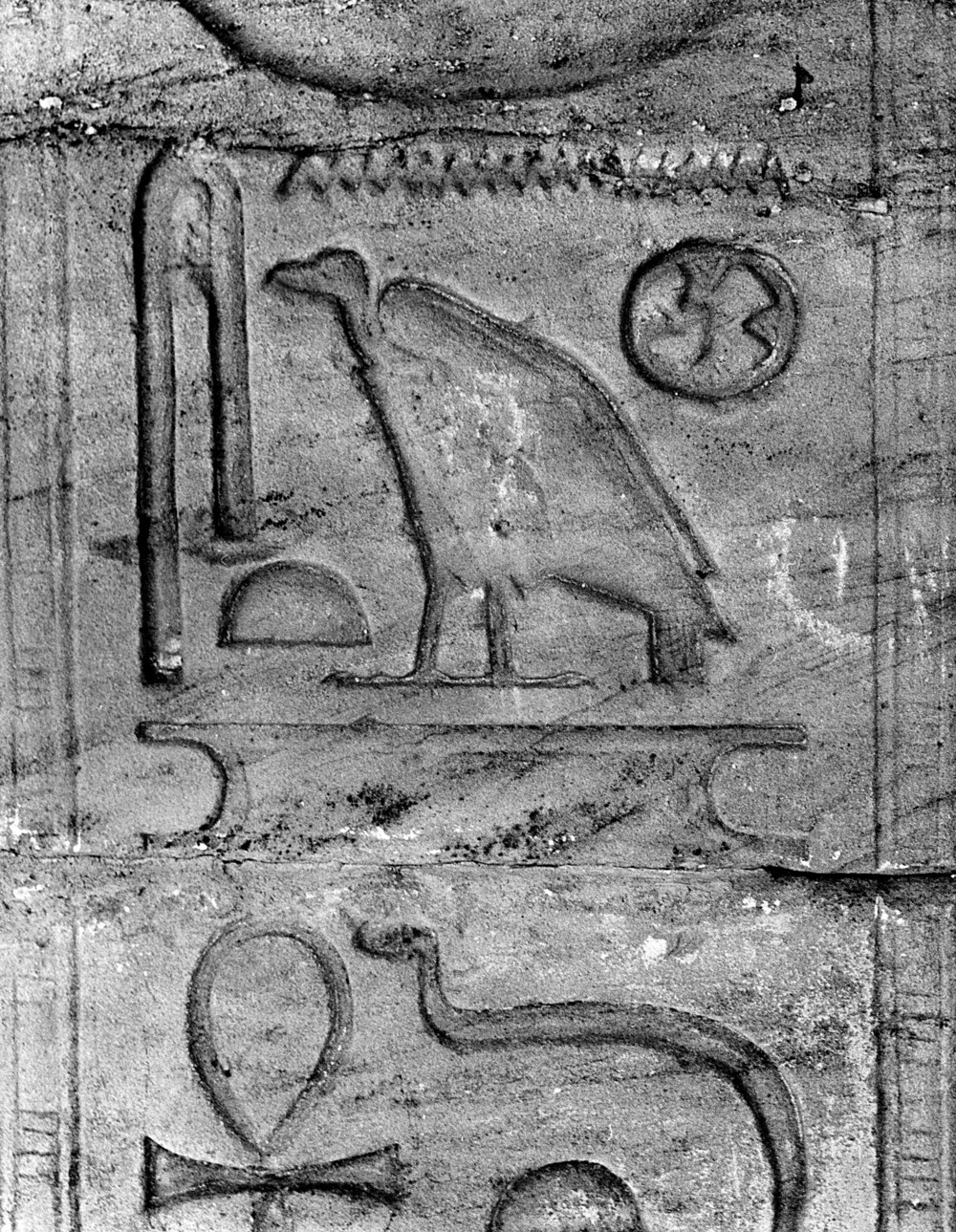
Inscriptions on this pillar in the hypostyle hall concern the lord of the Island of Biggeh.

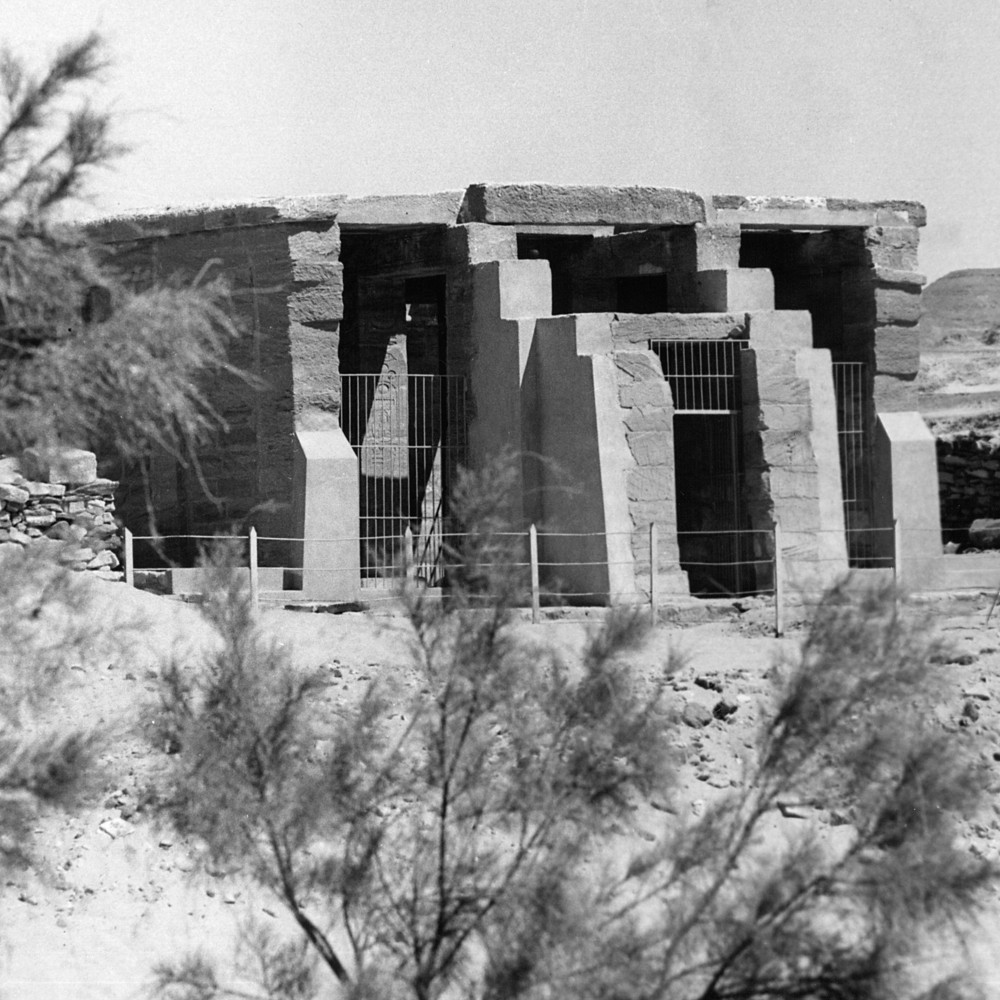
Exterior view

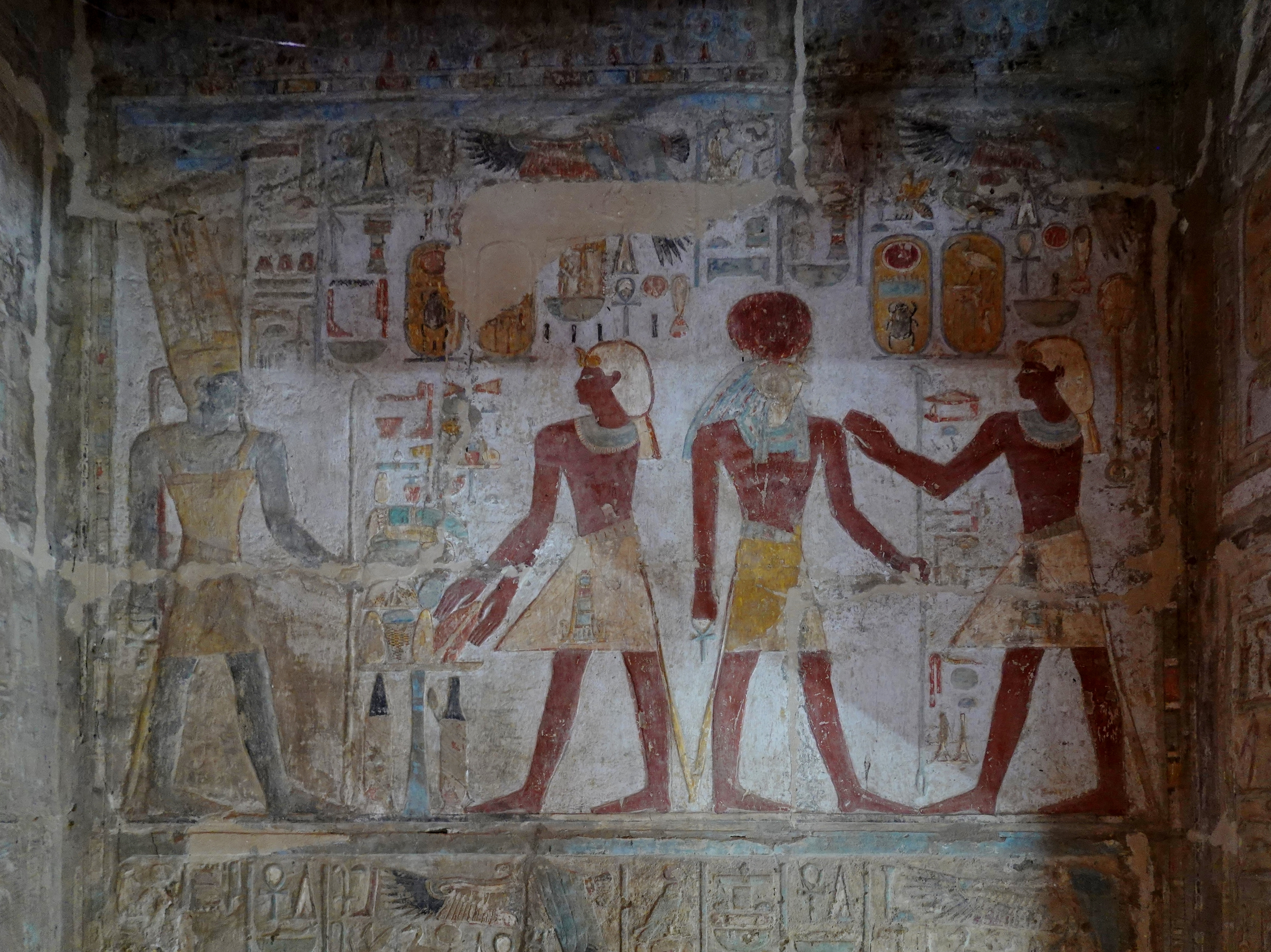
Interior detail depicting Thutmose III giving offerings to Amun and Ra

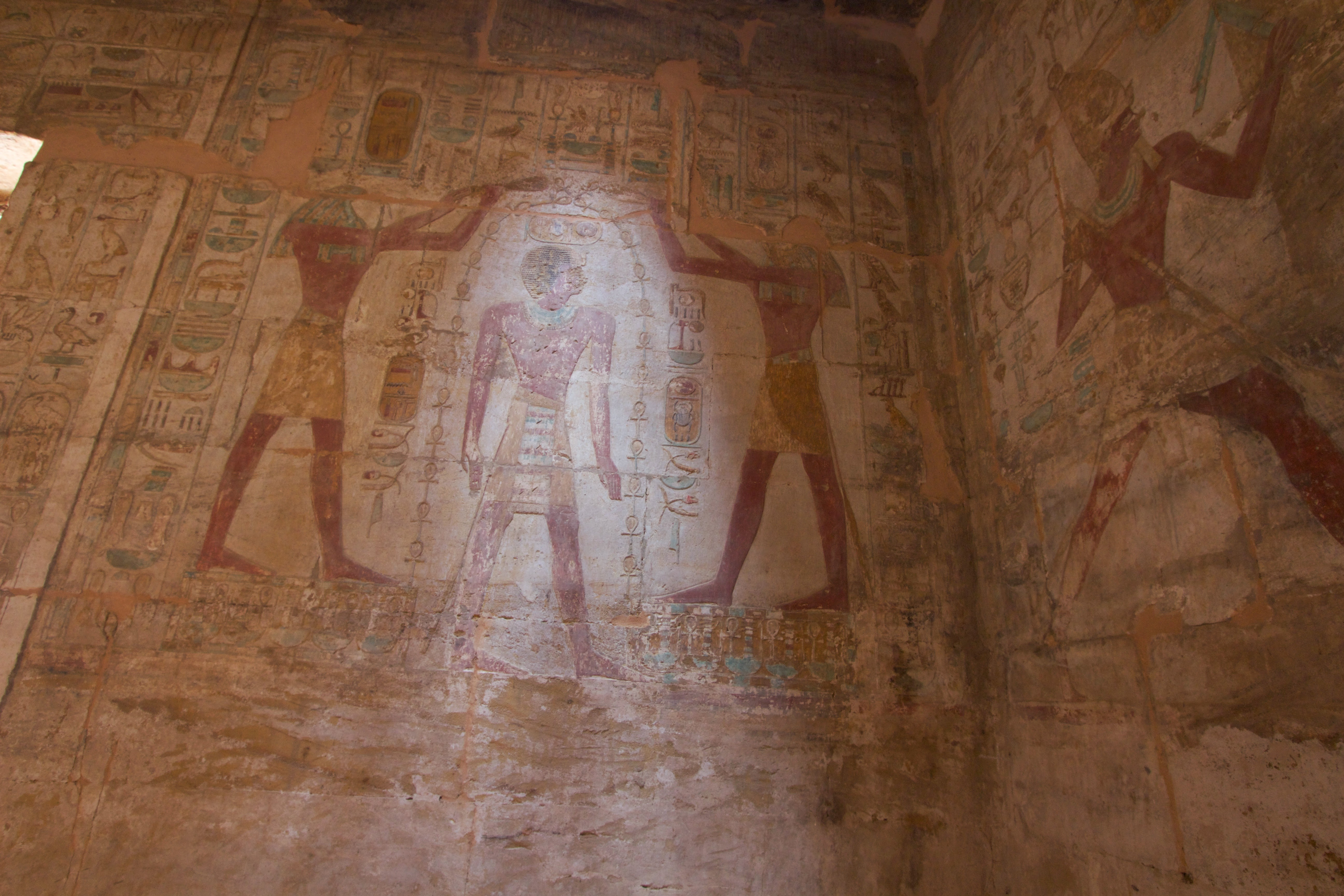
Interior detail depicting Amenhotep II with natural spotlight

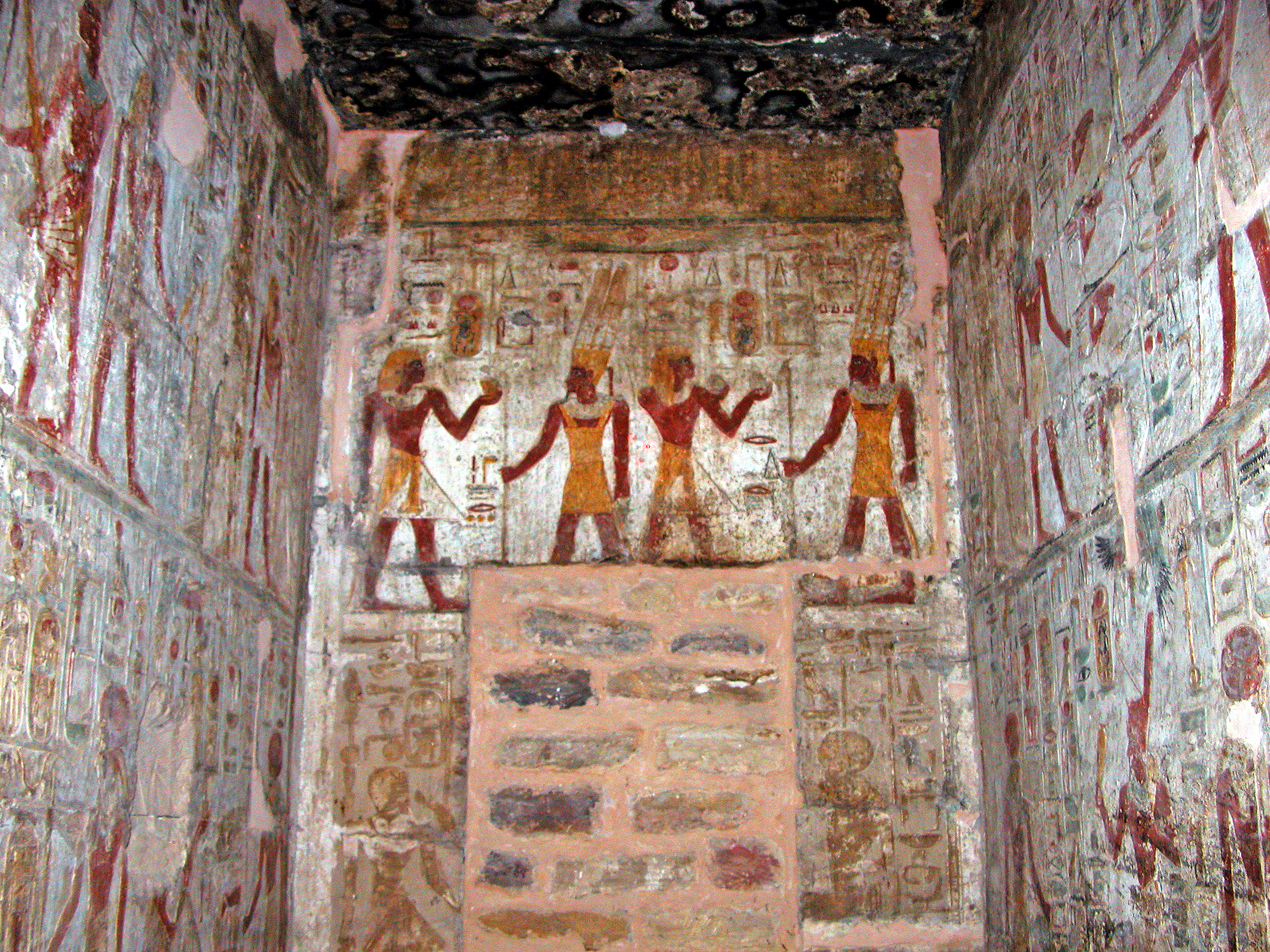
A small side chamber that shows Amenhotep II making offerings to Amun-Ra. A sealed doorway from the 1964 relocation can also be seen.

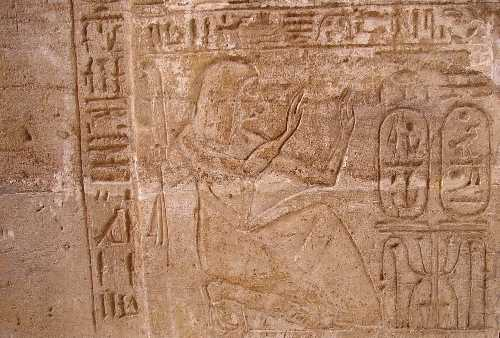
Portrait of chancellor Bay

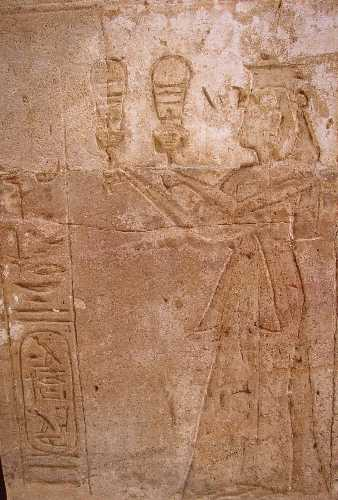
Portrait of Tausret holding two sistrums

== See also ==
- List of ancient Egyptian sites, including sites of temples

== Bibliography ==
- Desroches-Noblecourt, Christiane (1992). La Grande Nubiade, ou, Le parcours d'une égyptologue. Paris: Stock/Pernoud. ISBN 2-234-02409-9. OCLC 26482050.
- Olson, Lynne (2023). Empress of the Nile: The Daredevil Archaeologist Who Saved Egypt's Ancient Temples from Destruction (Softcover). Brunswick, Australia: Scribe House. ISBN 978-1-922585-99-8.
- Wilkinson, Richard H. (2000). The Complete Temples of Ancient Egypt (Hardcover). London: Thames & Hudson. ISBN 978-0500051009.
