= Viceroy of Kush =

Ancient Egyptian administrative title

Viceroy of Kush in hieroglyphs
sw zA n k S T14 N25
Sa-nisut-n-Kush
Sꜣ-nswt-n-Kꜣš
King's Son of Kush

The former Kingdom of Kerma in Nubia was a province of ancient Egypt from the 16th century BCE to 11th century BCE. During this period, the region was ruled by a viceroy who reported directly to the Egyptian Pharaoh.

Initially the position was titled "King's Son of the Southern Countries" and "King's Son, Overseer of the Southern Foreign Countries" but by the reign of Thutmose IV the title "King's Son of Kush" appears and becomes standard.

The viceroy was responsible for overseeing the area north of the Third Cataract, which was divided into Wawat in the north, centered at Aniba, and Kush in the south, centered at Soleb during the 18th Dynasty and later at Amara West. They were supported in this task by two deputies, a number of scribes, an overseer of cattle, and the priests of local Egyptian built temples.

Paintings in the tomb of Amenhotep Huy in the Theban necropolis depict some of the activities of a viceroy including overseeing the collection and tallying of tribute, and the delivery of said tribute by boat to the pharaoh in Thebes.

Use of the title King's Son of Kush seems to have lapsed after Piankh, who led an unsuccessful campaign against his rebellious predecessor Pinehesy, and Piankh's successor Herihor. After this point the title is rarely attested, and then outside of Nubia, for example for Neskhons (A), the wife of Pinedjem II who was named 'Superintendent of Southern Foreign Lands and Viceroy Kush' for unclear reasons. The title of King's Son of Kush appeared with some frequency in the later 22nd Dynasty and one of its Upper-Egyptian branches (often called the 23rd Dynasty), apparently designating important officials (several of them from within the royal family) stationed at Elephantine on the southern border of Egypt proper rather than effective administrators of the Nubian regions farther south.

== List of viceroys ==
Below is a list of viceroys mainly based on a list assembled by George Reisner, supplemented by Frédéric Payraudeau's prosopographical research of Theban officialdom.

Name	Dynasty	King (Pharaoh)	Comment
Ahmose called Si-Tayit	18th Dynasty	Ahmose I	Possibly the first viceroy.
Ahmose called Turo	18th Dynasty	Amenhotep I and Thutmose I	Son of Ahmose called Si-Tayit.
Seni	18th Dynasty	Thutmose I and Thutmose II.	
Penre	18th Dynasty	Hatshepsut and Thutmose III.	
Inebny called Amenemnekhu	Eighteenth Dynasty of Egypt	Hatshepsut and Thutmose III	First attested in year 18, and serving until about year 22.
Nehi	18th Dynasty	Thutmose III	Attested in year 22 or 23 of Tuthmose III.
Usersatet	18th Dynasty	Amenhotep II	
Amenhotep	18th Dynasty	Thutmose IV and Amenhotep III	
Merymose	18th Dynasty	Amenhotep III	
Tuthmosis	18th Dynasty	Akhenaten	
Amenhotep called Huy	18th Dynasty	Tutankhamun	Buried in TT40.
Paser (i)	18th Dynasty	Ay and Horemheb	Son of the viceroy Amenhotep called Huy.
Amenemopet	19th Dynasty	Seti I and Ramesses II	Son of Paser (i) and grandson of Amenhotep Huy.
Yuny	19th Dynasty	Ramesses II	Served as head of the stable under Sety I and was later promoted to viceroy.
Heqanakht	19th Dynasty	Ramesses II	
Paser (ii)	19th Dynasty	Ramesses II	Son of the High Priest of Min and Isis named Minmose; related to the family of Parennefer called Wennefer.
Huy	19th Dynasty	Ramesses II	He may have served either before or after Setau. Huy was also Mayor of Tjarw and a royal messenger to the Hatti. According to an inscription, he escorted Queen Maathorneferure from Hatti to Egypt.
Setau	19th Dynasty	Ramesses II	
Anhotep	19th Dynasty	Ramesses II	Buried in TT300.
Mernudjem	19th Dynasty	Possibly a viceroy under Ramesses II.	
Khaemtir	19th Dynasty	Merneptah	
Messuy	19th Dynasty	Merneptah, perhaps Amenmesse, and Seti II	Possibly the future king Amenmesse.
Seti	19th Dynasty	Siptah	
Hori (i)	20th Dynasty	Setnakhte	Son of Kama.
Hori (ii)	20th Dynasty	Ramesses III and Ramesses IV	Son of Hori I
Siese	20th Dynasty	Ramesses VI	
Nahihor	20th Dynasty	Ramesses VII and perhaps Ramesses VIII	
Wentawat	20th Dynasty	Ramesses IX	Son of Nahihor.
Ramessesnakht	20th Dynasty	Ramesses IX	Son of Wentawat.
Pinehesy	20th Dynasty	Ramesses XI	Played a role in suppressing the High Priest of Amun Amenhotep.
Setmose	20th Dynasty	Ramesses XI	
Piankh	20th Dynasty	Ramesses XI	Also the High Priest of Amun.
Akheperre	21st Dynasty	Menkheperre	The el-Hibeh archive mentions Akheperre who is a Third Prophet of Amun and a viceroy of Kush.
[Anonymous] son of Nimlot (C?)	22nd Dynasty	Osorkon II	The name is lost, but his father might be the king's son Nimlot (C).
Hatnakhte (or Nimlot?)	22nd Dynasty / 23rd Dynasty	Takelot II	The reading of the name is uncertain.
Pamiu (ii)	22nd Dynasty / 23rd Dynasty	Osorkon III	Also Vizier and Third Prophet of Amun. The title of viceroy is attested on the coffin of his great-grandson Padiamonet (iii).
Ankh-Osorkon (A)	22nd Dynasty / 23rd Dynasty	Takelot III	Also Vizier. Son of Djedptahiufankh, the brother of Takelot III and son of Osorkon III.

== See also ==
- Kingdom of Kush
- Pinehesy

== Bibliography ==
- Bohleke, Briant 1985, "An Ex Voto of the Previously Unrecognized Viceroy Setmose," Göttinger Miszellen 85: 13–24.
- Broekman, Gerard P. F. 2010, "The Leading Theban Priests of Amun and their Families under Libyan Rule," Journal of Egyptian Archaeology 96: 125-148.
- Budka, Julia 2017, "Constructing royal authority in New Kingdom towns in Nubia: some thoughts based on inscribed monuments from private residences," in: Tamás A. Bács & Horst Beinlich (eds.), Constructing Authority: Prestige, Reputation and the Perception of Power in Egyptian Kingship. 8. Symposion zur ägyptischen Königsideologie, Budapest, May 12-14, 2016, Wiesbaden: 29-45.
- Dodson, Aidan, and Dyan Hilton 2004, The Complete Royal Families of Ancient Egypt, London.
- Dodson, Aidan 2010, Poisoned Legacy: The Fall of the Nineteenth Egyptian Dynasty, Cairo.
- Payraudeau, Frédéric 2014, Administration, société et pouvoir à Thèbes sous la XXIIe dynastie bubastide, Cairo.
- Reisner, George A. 1920, "The Viceroys of Ethiopia," Journal of Egyptian Archaeology 6: 28-55, 73-88.
