= Setau =

Ancient Egyptian official, Viceroy of Kush

- Viceroy of Kush
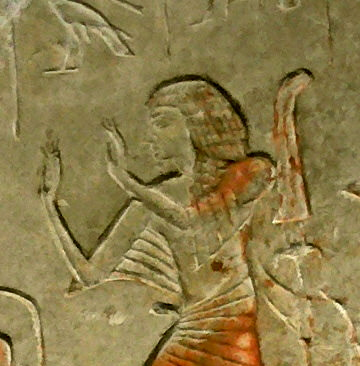
- Setau as depicted on a stela now in the Louvre
- Predecessor: Huy (Viceroy of Kush)?
- Successor: Anhotep?
- Dynasty: 19th Dynasty
- Pharaoh: Ramesses II
- Burial: TT289 in Thebes
- Spouse: Nofretmut
- Father: Siwadjet
- Mother: An, chantress of Amun

Setau was the Viceroy of Kush in the second half of Ramesses II's reign. Contemporary records show that Setau served in this position from Year 38 until at least Year 63 of Ramesses II's reign. Setau was "a graduate of the royal school" and already enjoyed an impressive record of royal service which is detailed in a long autobiographical inscription carved at Wadi es-Sebua. The temple of Wadi es-Sebua was built for Ramesses II by Setau around 1236 BC or Year 44 of this pharaoh's reign. Eleven of his stela, now in the Cairo Museum, were found in the courtyard of this temple and make it possible to establish his career and understand the precise duties of a viceroy. Setau states:

I was one whom his Lord caused to instructed....as a ward of the palace. I grew up in the royal abode when I was a youth...I was provided for with bread and beer from all the royal meals. I came forth as a scribe from the school, I was appointed to be Chief Scribe of the Vizier; I assessed the whole land with a scroll. A task I being equal to the task.

== Viceroy of Kush ==
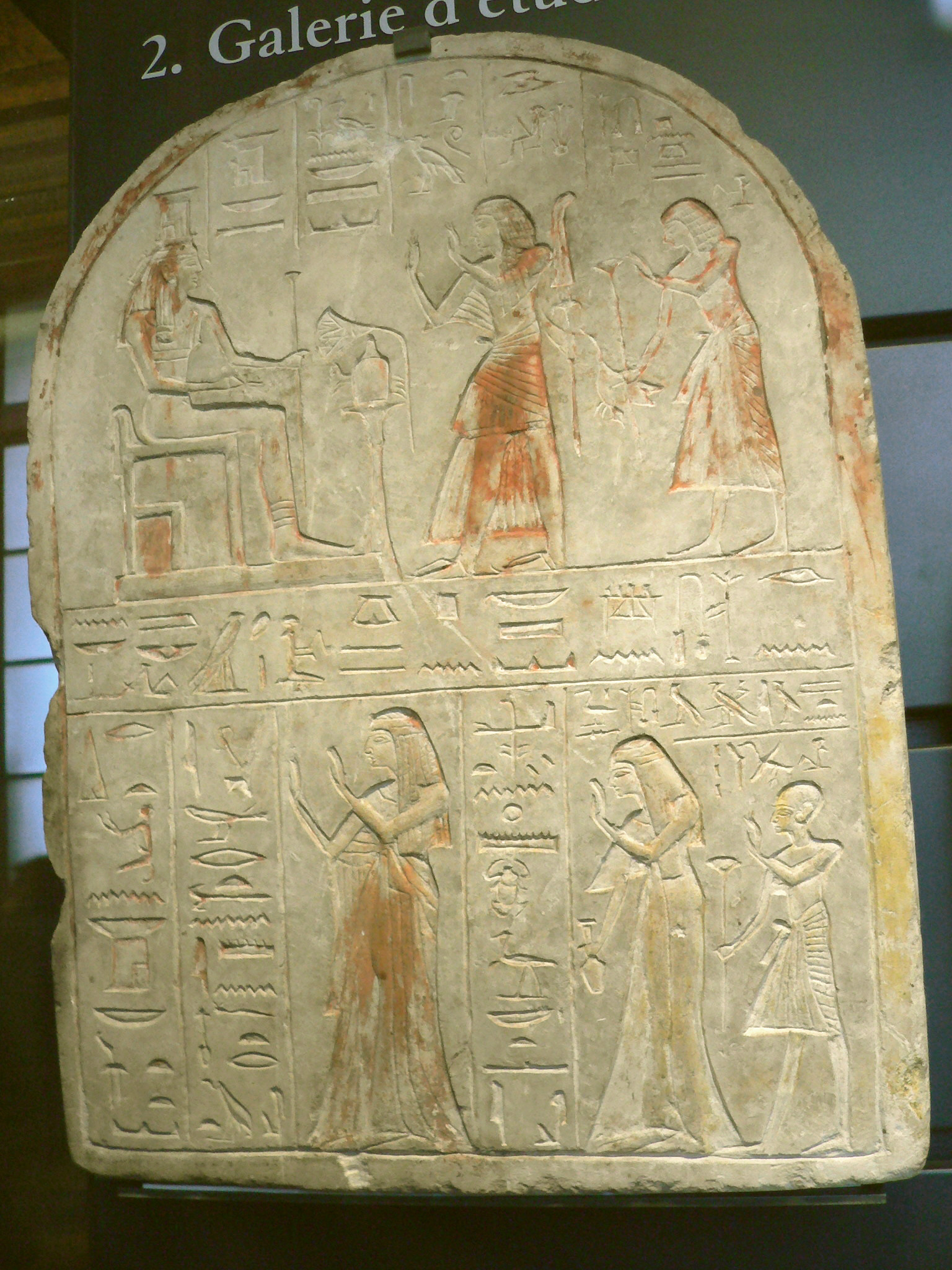
Stela depicting Setau and his wife Nofretmut

Setau attracted the king's attention and records that he was promoted "to be High Steward of Amen. I served as Superintendent of the Treasury and Festival Leader of Amen" before finally being appointed as the Viceroy of Nubia.

Setau was determined to set out his mark in Nubia and records that he:

directed serfs in their thousands and ten-thousands, and Nubians in hundred-thousands, without limit. I brought all the dues of the land of Kush in double measure. I caused the people to come in submission. Then I was commissioned to build the temple of Ramesses II in the Domain of Amun [ie. Wadi es-Sebua].

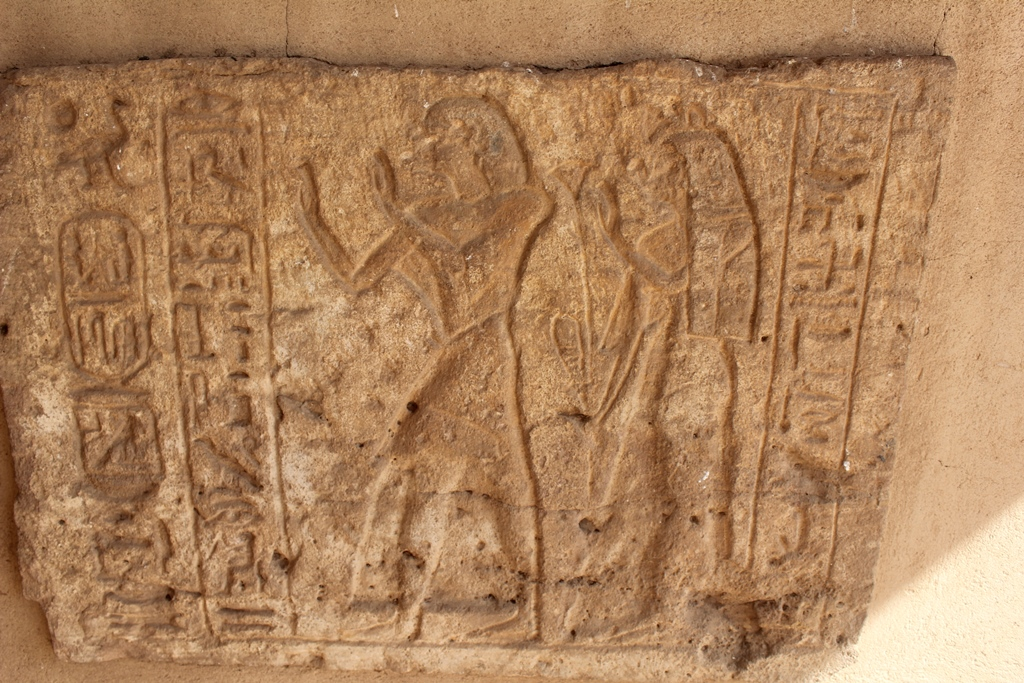
Stela, now in the National Museum of Sudan, with Setau, viceroy of Nubia, and his wife Nefro-mut worshipping Rameses II, whose Cartouche appears on the left side

Apart from the temple of Wadi es-Sebua, Setau also erected another temple at Gerf Hussein on the West Bank of the Nile around Year 45 of Ramesses II. This temple, called the 'House of Ptah' was a hemi-speos or a partially rock cut and partially exposed temple which was dedicated to Ptah, Ptah-Tatenen and Hathor and associated with the pharaoh himself. An avenue of sphinxes here "led up to a pylon serving as the entrance to a peristyle court decorated with colossal Osirid statues." Setau also notes in his series of autobiographical stelas that much of his workforce was derived from foreign captives and funded by spoils captured by Ramesses II on his campaigns. This statement is supported by a Year 44 text made by Ramose (TT7), an Egyptian army officer, who states that the pharaoh directed Setau "to take captives from the land of the Libyans" in order to construct the large temple of Wadi es-Sebua. However, Setau's ambitious goals to leave his mark on the country of Nubia were handicapped by inferior raw materials and his untrained workforce. As Joyce Tyldesley notes: "the buildings which he (ie. Setau) supervised, although at first sight magnificent, were by no means well built while even his own great stela were full of spelling mistakes." Additionally, he mentions leading a successful Nubian campaign against rebellions in Irem and Akuyata.

Setau also built or renovated at a temple at El-Kab.

== Burial ==
Setau's tomb (TT289) is located in the Dra' Abu el-Naga' area of the Theban Necropolis.

The tomb is large and decorated with scenes ranging from a funeral procession, to scenes from the Book of the Dead, to scenes of Setau – sometimes with his wife Nofretmut – before deities. Finds include the aforementioned fragments of the granite sarcophagus of Setau, and a coffin lid of Setau's wife with figures of Thoth and Imset. Setau reused the pyramid belonging to tomb 288, which belonged to Bekenkhons, whose tomb is also dated to the Ramesside period.

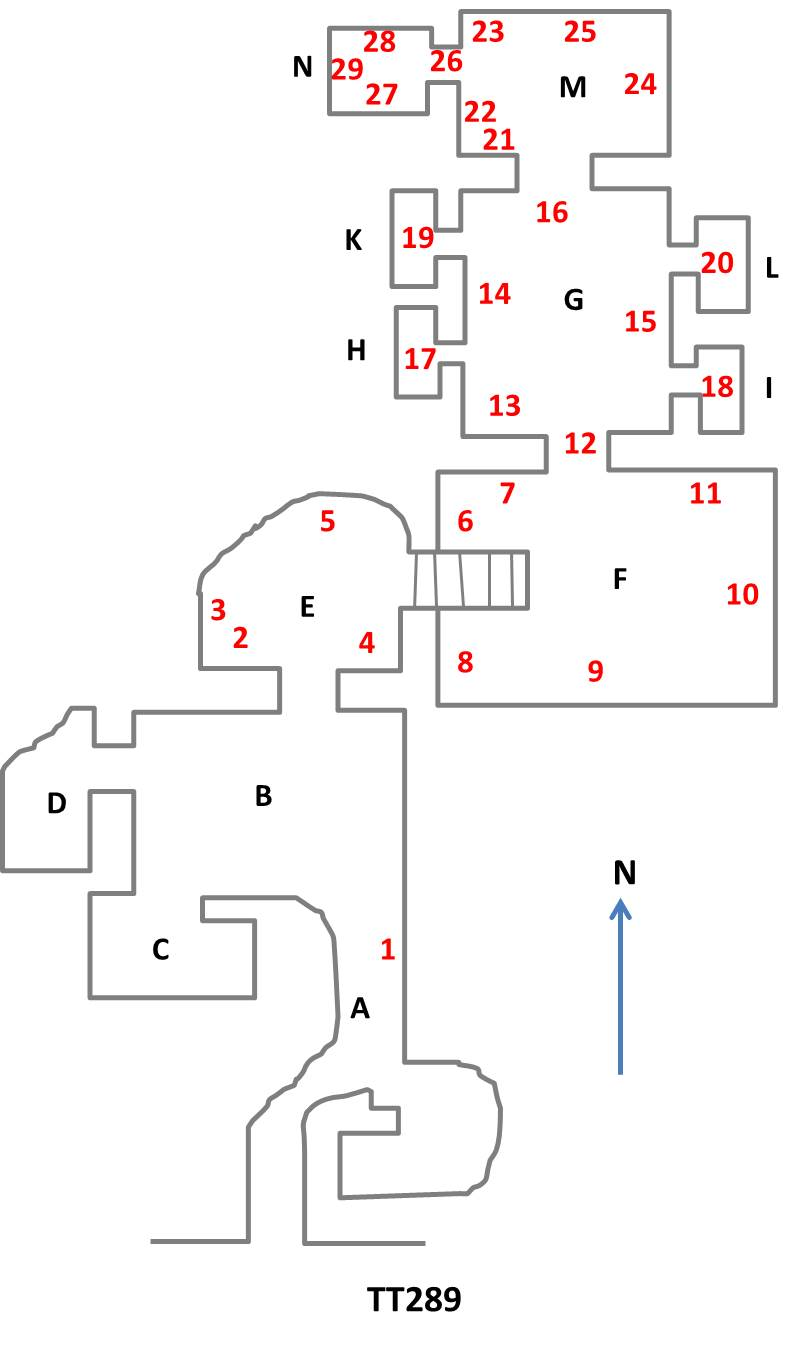
Floor plan of Setau's tomb, TT289

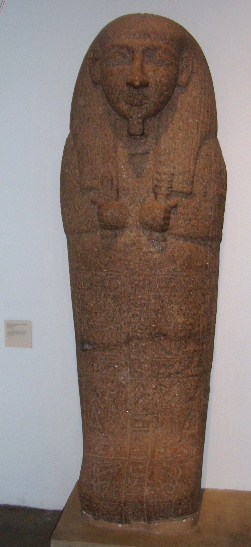
Sarcophagus lid of Setau (British Museum)
