= International Campaign to Save the Monuments of Nubia =

1960–80 relocation project in Egypt and Sudan

- UNESCO brochure on the anniversary of the campaign
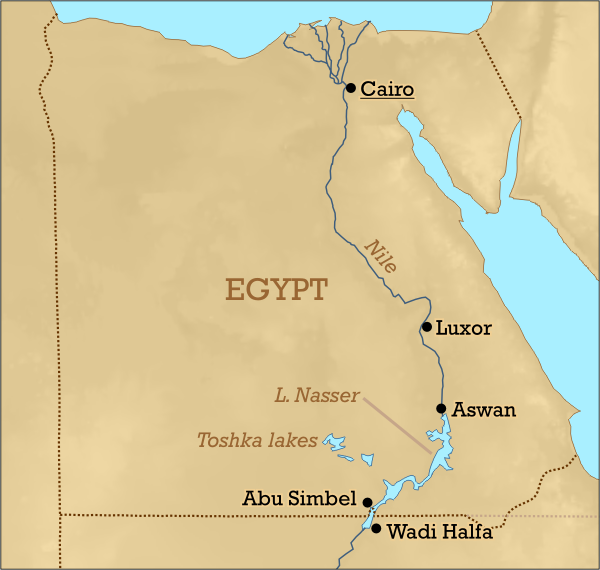
- Location: Aswan Governorate, Egypt
- Region: Nubia

UNESCO World Heritage Site
- Official name: Nubian Monuments from Abu Simbel to Philae
- Type: Cultural
- Criteria: i, iii, vi
- Designated: 1979 (3rd session)
- Reference no.: 88
- Region: Arab States

The International Campaign to Save the Monuments of Nubia was the effort to relocate 22 monuments in Lower Nubia, in Southern Egypt and northern Sudan, between 1960 and 1980. This was done in order to make way for the building of the Aswan Dam, at the Nile's first cataract (shallow rapids), a project launched following the 1952 Egyptian revolution. This project was undertaken under UNESCO leadership and a coalition of fifty countries. This process led to the creation of the World Heritage Convention in 1972, and thus the system of UNESCO World Heritage Sites.

The construction of the Aswan Dam was a key objective of the new regime the Free Officers movement of 1952 in order to better control flooding, provide increased water storage for irrigation and generate hydroelectricity, all of which were seen as pivotal for the industrialisation of Egypt.

The building of the dam was to result in the creation of Lake Nasser, which would submerge the banks of the Nile along its entire 479 km (298 mi) length south of the dam – flooding the entire area of historical Lower Nubia. This region was home to 22 critical historical sites, including but not limited to the Abu Simbel temples; as well as the temples at Philae, Kalabsha and Amada.

It was described in the UNESCO Courier as "the greatest archaeological rescue operation of all time".

In April 1979, the monuments were inscribed on the World Heritage List as the Nubian Monuments from Abu Simbel to Philae, as one of the second group of properties added to the list (the first 12 had been added in 1978).

== History ==
The UNESCO division of the UN logo

In 1954, UNESCO founded the CEDAE (Centre d'Étude et de Documentation sur l'Ancienne Égypte, in English the Documentation and Study Centre for the History of the Art and Civilization of Ancient Egypt) in Cairo under the direction of Christiane Desroches Noblecourt, who was a French Egyptologist at the Louvre. The Study Centre worked on documenting over 400 private tombs, primarily through photography and photogrammetry.

=== Desroches-Noblecourt begins lobbying to save the monuments ===
Aware that planning was underway for the Aswan high dam and of the potential threat that it posed to Nubian monuments, CEDAE, with the permission of UNESCO decided to concentrate its efforts on Nubia. Christiane Desroches Noblecourt became determined to do her best to save the monuments and in particular Abu Simbel that were threatened by any lake created by the new dam.

To enlist support she arranged for Luther Evans, the director general of UNESCO, while on a visit to Egypt to visit Abu Simbel. "Despite at the end of his visit proclaiming "These works are imperishable and must be protected. We must take action to do so", UNESCO took no action.

At an international conference of museum directors and antiquities experts in Paris in May 1955 organised by the International Council of Museums Desroches-Noblecourt argued that every effort needed to be made to save the monuments of Nubia. Though sympathetic to her appeal, attendees had doubts that it was even technologically possible to do anything with some of the view that there were higher priorities. A short time later UNESCO's chief lawyer, the Egyptian Hanna Sabba suggested she try and enlist the support of René Maheu who was currently the undersecretary of UNESCO. Maheu promised his support. By September 1955, field expeditions under Dr. Ahmed Badawi were being undertaken in Nubia with UNESCO permission.

In the aftermath of the Suez Crisis Desroches-Noblecourt along with all other British and French citizens were confined to their homes or hotels before being expelled from the country in early November 1956. Then at the end of December in that year UNESCO was informed by the Egyptian government that while they would no longer welcome British and French experts, they would make an exception for her. With the approval of the French government she returned to her position at CEDAE. To make up for the restriction on hiring British and French experts, she used her international contacts to recruit specialists from other countries as CEDAE raced to document the monuments of Nubia. When she became aware of the Egyptian governments plan to close the French Institute of Oriental Archaeology (IFAO) she was able to, with the support of the Canadian ambassador and a lawyer hired by the French government, broker an arrangement that allowed the IFAO to continue. Despite numerous appeals to Egyptian and UNESCO to save the Nubian monuments she was making no progress.

=== Okasha comes on board ===
Among those who had rejected Desroches-Noblecourt's appeals was Tharwat Okasha, head of the newly created Egyptian Ministry of Culture which had been established in 1958 and had responsibility for all of the country's antiquities. However, in late 1958 he had a sudden epiphany following a visit by Raymond A. Hare, United States ambassador to Egypt, and James Rorimer, the director of the Metropolitan Museum in New York. During their meeting, Rorimer made the comment that since Egypt was not prepared to protect its own monuments, it would be better to sell them off to countries that could. Several years later he described being, "haunted by the threat of appalling loss. I deemed it the duty of the Ministry of Culture to plan the salvation of the threatened monuments. Preserving our treasures for posterity became the imperative, and I determined then that the impossible would be made possible." At a discussion the next day with Desroches-Noblecourt, where he recounted the insult he had felt at Rorimer's remarks, she proposed that Egypt join forces with UNESCO in a campaign to save them. By now Maheu was deputy director general at UNESCO and in a position to help. In January 1959 Maheu met with Okasha in Cairo. Immediately upon his return to Paris, Maheu had Vittorino Veronese, the director general of UNESCO call Okasha on the telephone to express his full support for a campaign to save the monuments.

At the time the Egyptian government was dedicated to improving the country and had placed little importance in preserving its heritage, though it had taken pride in pharaonic Egypt's accomplishments. It took several days but by the end of January 1959(Ramses Re Couronne Saroite Okacha Dar El Maaref 1974pp 13,14) Okasha was able to convince Nasser to agree to asking for international assistance. Nasser also agreed to Okasha's proposal that Egypt would cover a third of the cost, with the project overseen by UNESCO and the Ministry of Culture. In return for their financial assistance, Egypt would offer inducements to financial contributors. This took the form of gifts of a number of antiquities, including four Nubian temples, while foreign archaeologists would be granted not only access to threatened Nubian sites, but countries would be allowed to keep half of what was uncovered. This was a dramatic reversal of the country's 30 year long reluctance to allowing foreign archaeologists to receive a share of any finds. The day after receiving Nasser's approval, Desroches-Noblecourt drafted a letter on Okasha's request, which Nasser signed on 4 April 1959 and she hand-delivered in April to UNESCO, which formally requested UNESCO's assistance. In June 1959 UNESCO's executive authorised Veronese to produce a plan on how to undertake the saving of the monuments.

Wadi es-Sebua, or Valley of the Lions

To provide information for the plan, teams of experts from CEDAE were dispatched across Nubia to conduct ground inspections of the threatened monuments. Meanwhile, Desroches-Noblecourt engaged engineers from France's National Geographical Institute to conduct an aerial survey of Nubia, using aircraft from the Egyptian air force. In October 1959, an international multi-disciplinary committee of experts from UNESCO, led by John Brew, the head of Harvard's Peabody Museum of Archaeology and Ethnology, spent 10 days being escorted by Desroches-Noblecourt around Nubia. The committee's report, which was countersigned by the Egyptian government, recommended that efforts be made to save 24 monuments stating that their loss would be "an irreparable loss for the world." The report was accepted in November 1959 by UNESCO's executive council and approved by its general conference in January 1960.

On 9 January 1960 formal construction began on the Aswan High Dam.

=== UNESCO issues a campaign to save the monuments ===
In early 1960, Veronese officially submitted a proposal to the executive board of UNESCO to attempt to save the monuments, pointing out various concerns regarding the need to preserve Nubian cultural heritage sites in Egypt and Sudan, while promoting the welfare of Egypt in relation to the proposed Aswan Dam. In the proposal he stated: "It is not easy to choose between a heritage of the past and the present well-being of a people, living in need in the shadow of one of history's most splendid legacies, it is not easy to choose between temples and crops." The executive board accepted Veronese's proposal and on 8 March 1960 Veronese formally announced UNESCO's campaign to save the Nubian monuments. To build support of the campaign Okasha lobbied foreign ambassadors and heads of state, while Maheu, with the assistance of Prince Sadruddin Aga Khan, who was head of UNESCO's international action committee, lobbied the government officials of UN member nations for financial assistance. Ratter than provide money to the campaign West Germany opted to directly fund and organize the relocation of the Temple of Kalabsha. The United Kingdom refused any assistance as it was still angry over the humiliation it had received during the Suez Crisis. It later reversed this decision. To further publicise the campaign Okasha also arranged for collections of Egyptian antiquities to tour Europe, Japan and the United States, which required him to overcome considerable resistance from some officials within the Egyptian government.

=== Jacqueline Kennedy gives her support ===
While the United States supported, in principle, the efforts to save the monuments, the anti-communist orientated Eisenhower administration was opposed to providing any financial aid to Egypt, due to that country's acceptance of Soviet assistance in the construction of the Aswan High Dam. However, that position began to change with the coming to power of the Kennedy administration. Jacqueline Kennedy, a few weeks after becoming First Lady, wrote a long memo to her husband, arguing that the Nubian monuments should be saved and that the United States should contribute. As a result of this lobbying, together with that from Prince Sadruddin Aga Khan, John Brew and John Wilson from the University of Chicago and others, the administration, who were looking to improve relations with non-aligned countries and counter Soviet influence, agreed to try and provide financial support. On 4 April 1961 Kennedy asked Congress to contribute an initial $4 million to the Nubian effort and was able to overcome tepid interest from many congressmen and even outright opposition from some to have it narrowly authorised.

To further increase public support for the saving of the monuments, the Egyptian government agreed to 24 small treasures from Tutankhamun's tomb going on a 15-city tour in late 1961 in the United States. On 3 November 1961, Jacqueline Kennedy opened the first exhibition, which was held in the National Gallery of Art in Washington. Although it was a huge cultural success, the tour, to UNESCO's disappointment, did not result in any additional private or government donations. In late 1962, UNESCO issued a final appeal for funding saying it needed funding in place by the spring of 1963 if it was to proceed with what was now the only option for saving Abu Simbel, which was to be moved by cutting it into pieces. In response, only 20 countries initially made additional contributions.

Aware that the Kennedys had an interest in the Nubian monuments, Lucius Battle, who had been appointed the assistant secretary of state for educational and cultural affairs in June 1962, identified that his country had acquired a large amount of Egyptian currency as a result of its Food for Peace program, which sold surplus American crops at a significant discount to worthy foreign governments. The program was required by the rules of its establishment under Public Law 480 to spend this money on economic development in Egypt. Battle proposed diverting $12 million of this money to fund the saving of Abu Simbel, for which approval from Congress was required. Jacqueline Kennedy again voiced her support in a memo to her husband in January 1963 supporting the saving of Abu Simbel. In that same month she was supported by an appeal from Gianni Agnelli directly to President Kennedy. In June 1963 the Kennedy administration committed the United States to providing US$12 million of funding in the equivalent Egyptian pounds. This pledge reenergised the campaign and allowed Egypt and UNESCO to finally reach agreement to proceed with the option to relocate Abu Simbel by dissection and funding, with Egypt agreeing to pay a third of the cost. To obtain the hard currency needed to make the down payments to the companies that would be awarded contracts to undertake the work Egypt secured a $3 million loan from Kuwait.

However, in February 1964 three months after John Kennedy's assassination the House of Representatives Appropriations ruled against the funding proposal and the full House refused to overrule them. President Johnson's administration then took up the issue as a way of honouring his predecessor, with a number of prominent Americans (including Joshua Logan and S. Dillion Ripley) and organizations enlisted to lobby members of the Senate. Many senators were sceptical about the proposal, including Allen Ellender, who however pointed that that there was a little known section in Public Law 480 called the Cooley provision, which did not require the approval of Congress. This allowed for the local currency to be given to private firms for business development and trade expansion, if it had been in the foreign country for more than three years. As he knew how important it had been to the Kennedy's, John J. Rooney, who was the chairman of the House of Representatives Appropriations sub-committee in charge of foreign aid was prepared to accept the repurposing of the money.

Following the lead shown by the United States, over 50 countries in total made financial contributions. The United States was the biggest donor, following by France, Italy, West Germany, Netherlands, Spain and Sweden. An honorary committee was first founded by King Gustav VI Adolf of Sweden to create international support for the campaign, with various world political leaders and UNESCO members as participants. An official International Action Committee was established after under the UNESCO Director General in order to secure funding, service, and equipment from participating member states. They decided that UNESCO would be in charge of planning the program of operations, coordination of labor, and the collection of funding. The intention was for them to serve as an intermediaries between donors and the nations of Egypt and Sudan.

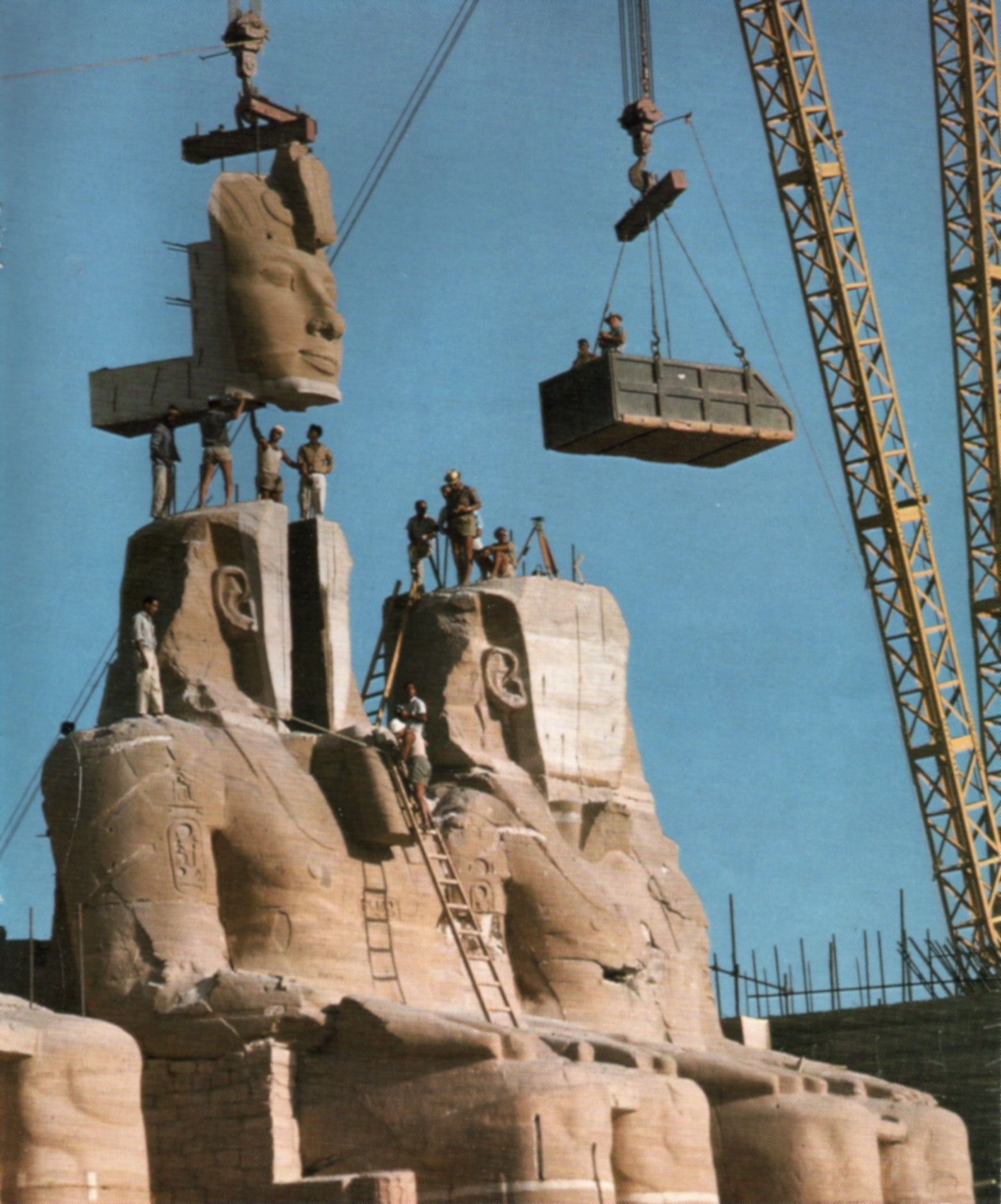
The statue of Ramses the Great at the Great Temple of Abu Simbel is reassembled after having been moved in 1967 to save it from flooding.

Egyptians contested the oversight of UNESCO, insisting that they could meet demands of donors without UNESCO involvement. Despite this, UNESCO continued a significant amount of oversight throughout the duration of the campaign. The level of fieldwork for the project had not been previous undertaken on equivalent scale or length of time, leaving many to praise the campaign as a feat of the field of archeology. Desroches-Noblecourt, who remained in charge of the CEDAE in Cairo, held a leading role within the archeological survey aspect of the campaign. She was tasked with the manner in which notes would be circulated during the project, suggesting that archaeological missions working in Nubia would be required to hand over copies publications and notes produced during the project to the centre, and abiding by the centre's publication techniques. Excavations from Egypt would be only required to send over copies of notes, without requiring copies of publications or oversight into said publications. This is theorised to be related to the post-colonial desire to fortify Egyptian identity in a cultural history following the 1952 Egyptian revolution.

The removal of temples was a project of greater difficulty with sites prioritised by importance, with the most expensive site excavated being Abu Simbel.

=== Impact on the local population ===
The construction of Lake Nasser, as well as the excavations required in the Nubia campaign, involved the relocation of many Nubians native to the region. First in 1902 due to the construction of the Aswan Low Dam, then in both 1912 and 1933 due to the rising water levels, and a fourth time after the creation of the Aswan High Dam. The forced relocation stripped many native Nubians of their ancestral homelands, with the compensation of unsuitable homes for living and agriculture. This forced many Nubians to immigrate to cities in Egypt and later Sudan.

== Timeline ==
A timeline of the key dates of the campaign is shown below:

	Diplomacy	Relocation work	Aswan Dam
6 April 1959	Egypt appeals to UNESCO		
24 October 1959	Sudan appeals to UNESCO		
9 January 1960			Work on the Aswan High Dam officially begun
8 March 1960	Director-General of Unesco appeals to the international community		
Summer 1960		Temples of Taffeh, Dabod and Kertassi dismantled by the Egyptian Antiquities Service	
Nov. Dec. 1962	Unesco's General Conference creates Executive Committee for the International Campaign		
1962–63		Temple of Kalabsha dismantled, transferred and re-erected	
Spring 1964		Work begins on transfer of Abu Simbel temples	
14 May 1964			Diversion of Nile to feed the turbines of the High Dam
September 1964			Lake Nasser begins to fill
22 September 1968		Completion of the Abu Simbel operation	
6 November 1968	UNESCO launches International Campaign to save the Temples of Philae		
1970			Construction of Aswan High Dam completed
1972		Work begins on Philae rescue operation; monuments to be transferred to nearby island of Agilkia	
May 1974		Cofferdam around the island of Philae is completed and water is pumped out	
April 1977		Foundations of the Philae monuments ready on the island of Agilkia and reconstruction work begins	
August 1979		Completed at Agilkia	
10 March 1980		Overall project completion	

== Overview of Campaign ==
The campaign was primarily led by Tharwat Okasha, the Egyptian Minister of Culture, René Maheu, Assistant Director-General of UNESCO, and Christiane Desroches Noblecourt, French Egyptologist at the Louvre.

The number of relocated monuments have been stated as 22 or 24 depending on how an individual site is defined. Only one archaeological site in Lower Nubia, Qasr Ibrim, remains in its original location and above water; previously a cliff-top settlement, it was transformed into an island. The relocated sites can be grouped as follows:

- Two temple groups moved nearby to nearly identical sites
- Eleven temples rebuilt and grouped in three oases overlooking Lake Nasser
- Seven temples placed in two museums
- Five sent to Western museums as "grants-in-return" for technical and financial assistance

The list of relocated monuments is as follows:

	Historical			Relocation		Current	
Monument	Image	Location	Period	Date	Led by	Image	Location
Abu Simbel (two temples)	An Egyptian temple	65m below current location	13th century BCE	1964–68	Coalition	An Egyptian temple	65m above historical location, in artificial hill
Philae temple complex	An Egyptian temple	Philae Island	300 BCE – 100 AD	1972–79	Coalition	An Egyptian temple	Agilkia Island
Temple of Amada	An Egyptian temple	Amada	1400s BCE		France	An Egyptian temple	New Amada
Temple of Derr	An Egyptian temple	Derr	1200s BCE		Egypt	An Egyptian temple	New Amada
Tomb of Pennut at Aniba	An Egyptian temple	Aniba			Egypt	An Egyptian temple	New Amada
Temple of Kalabsha (except gate, see below)	An Egyptian temple	Kalabsha	30 BCE	1962–63	Germany	An Egyptian temple	New Kalabsha
Temple of Gerf Hussein	An Egyptian temple	Gerf Hussein	1200s BCE		Egypt	An Egyptian temple	New Kalabsha
Kiosk of Qertassi	An Egyptian temple	Qertassi	0 – 100 AD	1960	Egypt	An Egyptian temple	New Kalabsha
Temple of Beit el-Wali	An Egyptian temple	Beit el-Wali	1200s BCE		Egypt	An Egyptian temple	New Kalabsha
Temple of Dakka	An Egyptian temple	Dakka	200 BCE – 100 AD		Egypt	An Egyptian temple	New Wadi es-Sebua
Temple of Maharraqa	An Egyptian temple	Maharraqa	0 – 100 AD		Egypt	An Egyptian temple	New Wadi es-Sebua
Temples of Wadi es-Sebua	An Egyptian temple	Wadi es-Sebua	1400–1200 BCE		Egypt	An Egyptian temple	New Wadi es-Sebua
Horemheb Temple at Abu Oda	An Egyptian temple	Abu Oda					Nubian Museum, Aswan
Temple of Aksha		Aksha	1200s BCE			An Egyptian temple	National Museum of Sudan
The temples in the fortified town of Buhen	An Egyptian temple	Buhen	1800s BCE			An Egyptian temple	National Museum of Sudan
The temples at Semna East and West fortresses	An Egyptian temple	Semna	1900s BCE			An Egyptian temple	National Museum of Sudan
Temple of Debod	An Egyptian temple	Debod	100s BCE	1960	Spain	An Egyptian temple	Madrid, Spain
Temple of Dendur	An Egyptian temple	Dendur	23 BCE		United States	An Egyptian temple	Metropolitan Museum of Art, New York City, United States
Temple of Taffeh	An Egyptian temple	Taffeh	25 BCE – 14 CE	1960	Netherlands	An Egyptian temple	Rijksmuseum van Oudheden, Leiden, the Netherlands
Temple of Ellesyia		Ellesyia	1400s BCE		Italy	An Egyptian temple	Museo Egizio, Turin, Italy
Kalabsha Gate	An Egyptian temple	Kalabsha	30 BCE	1962–63	Germany	An Egyptian temple	Egyptian Museum of Berlin, Germany – part of the Temple of Kalabsha

=== Historical images, monuments then and now ===
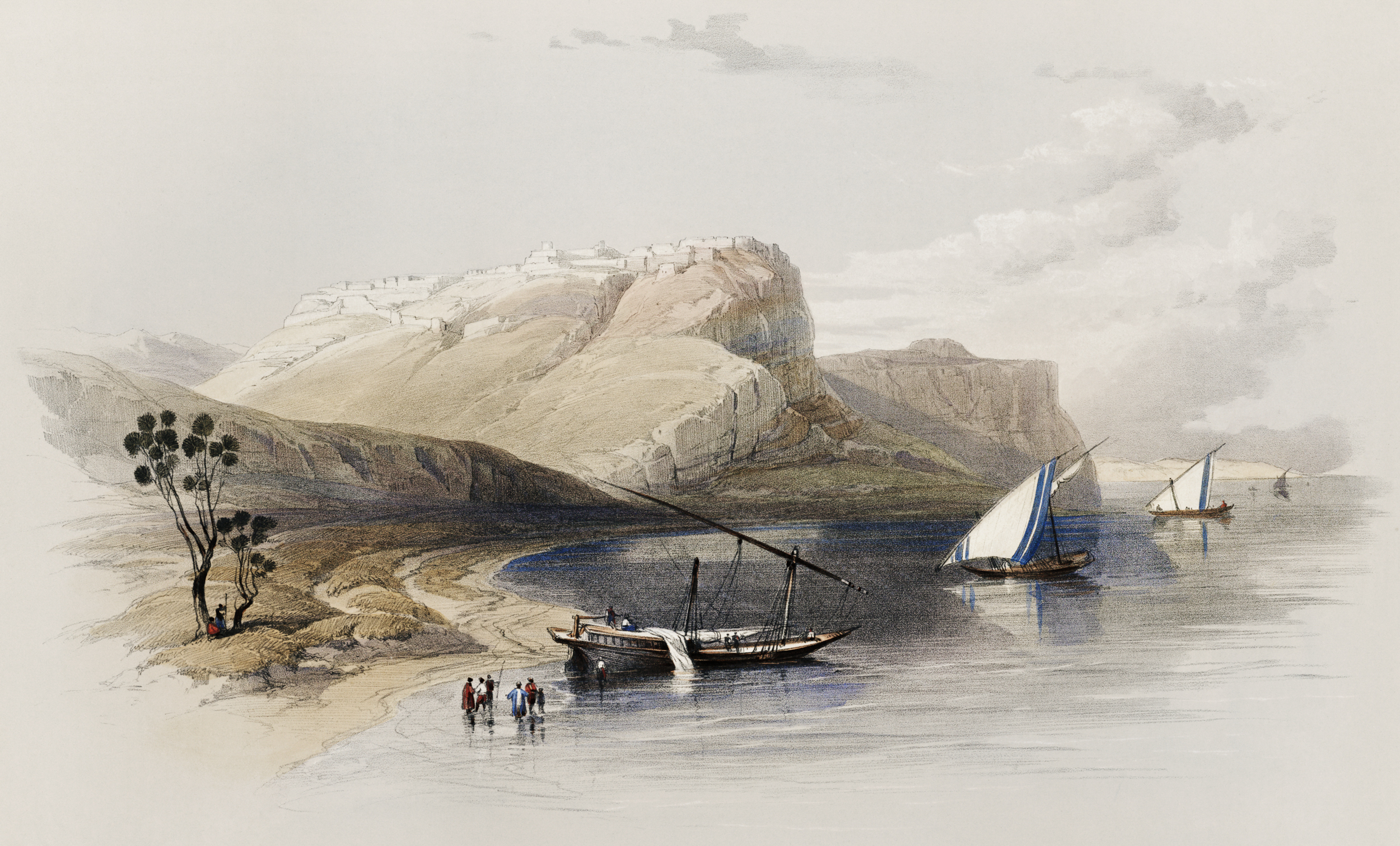
Qasr Ibrim (1840s)

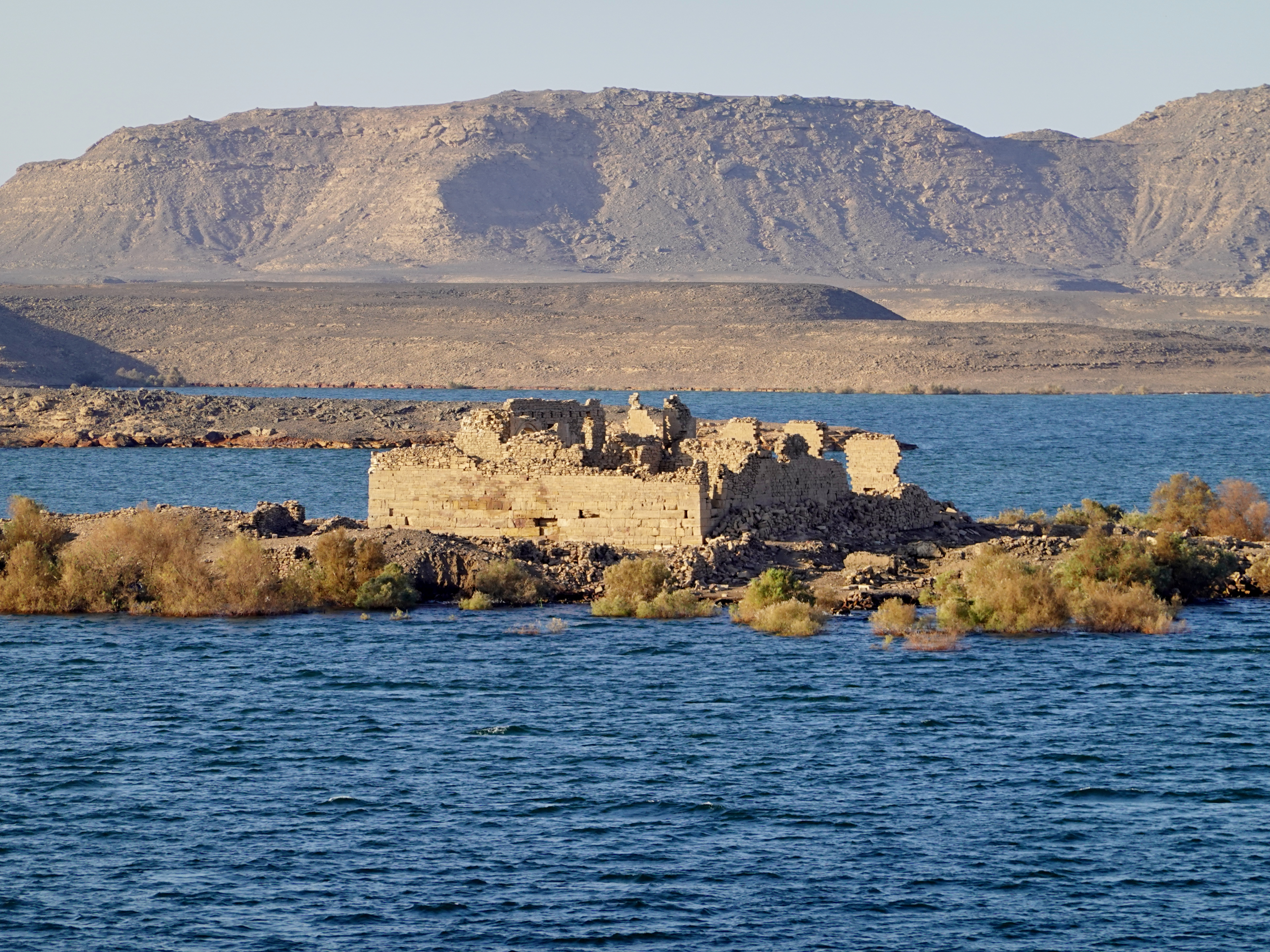
Qasr Ibrim today

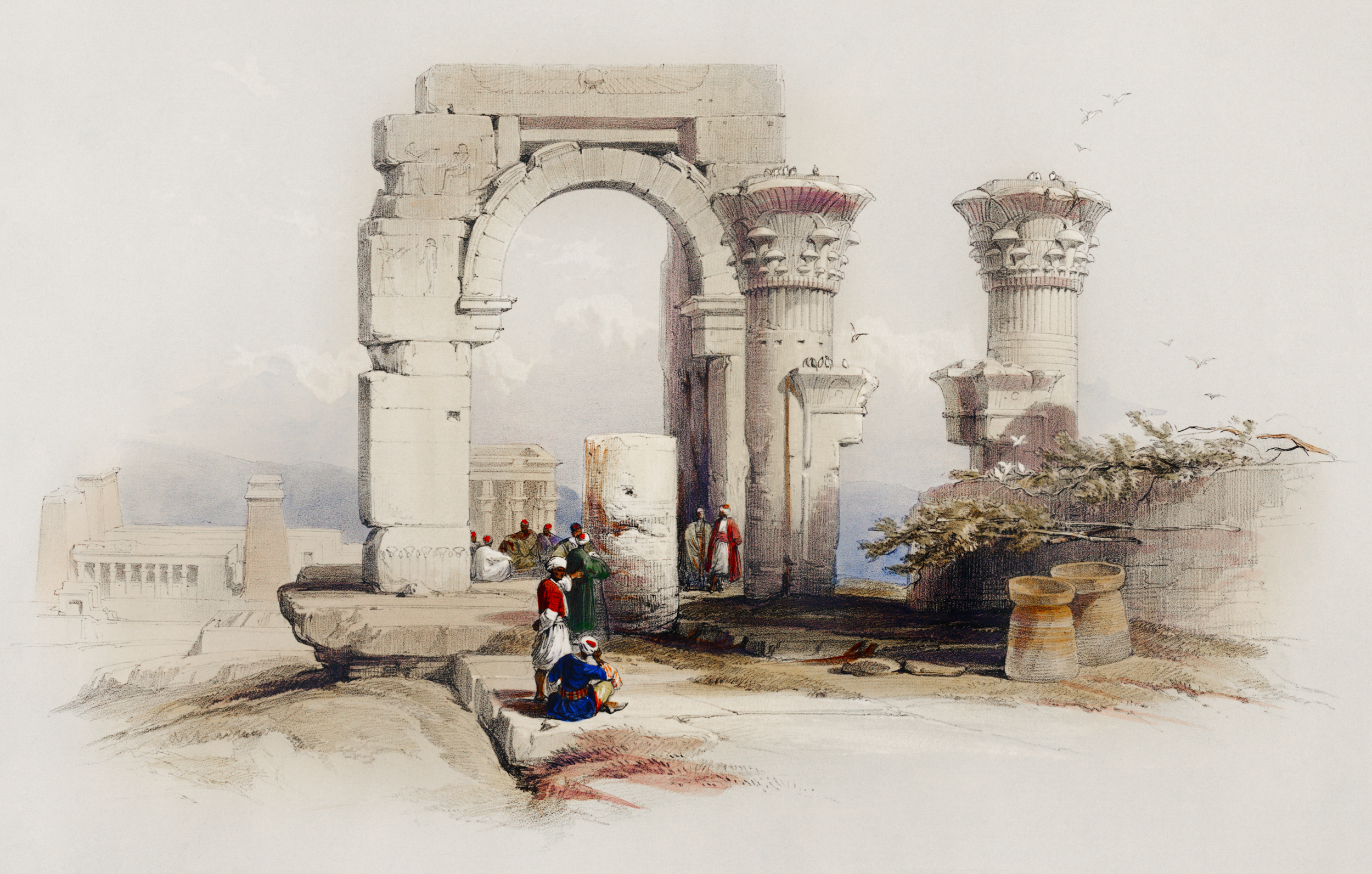
Ruins of Bigeh (1840s)

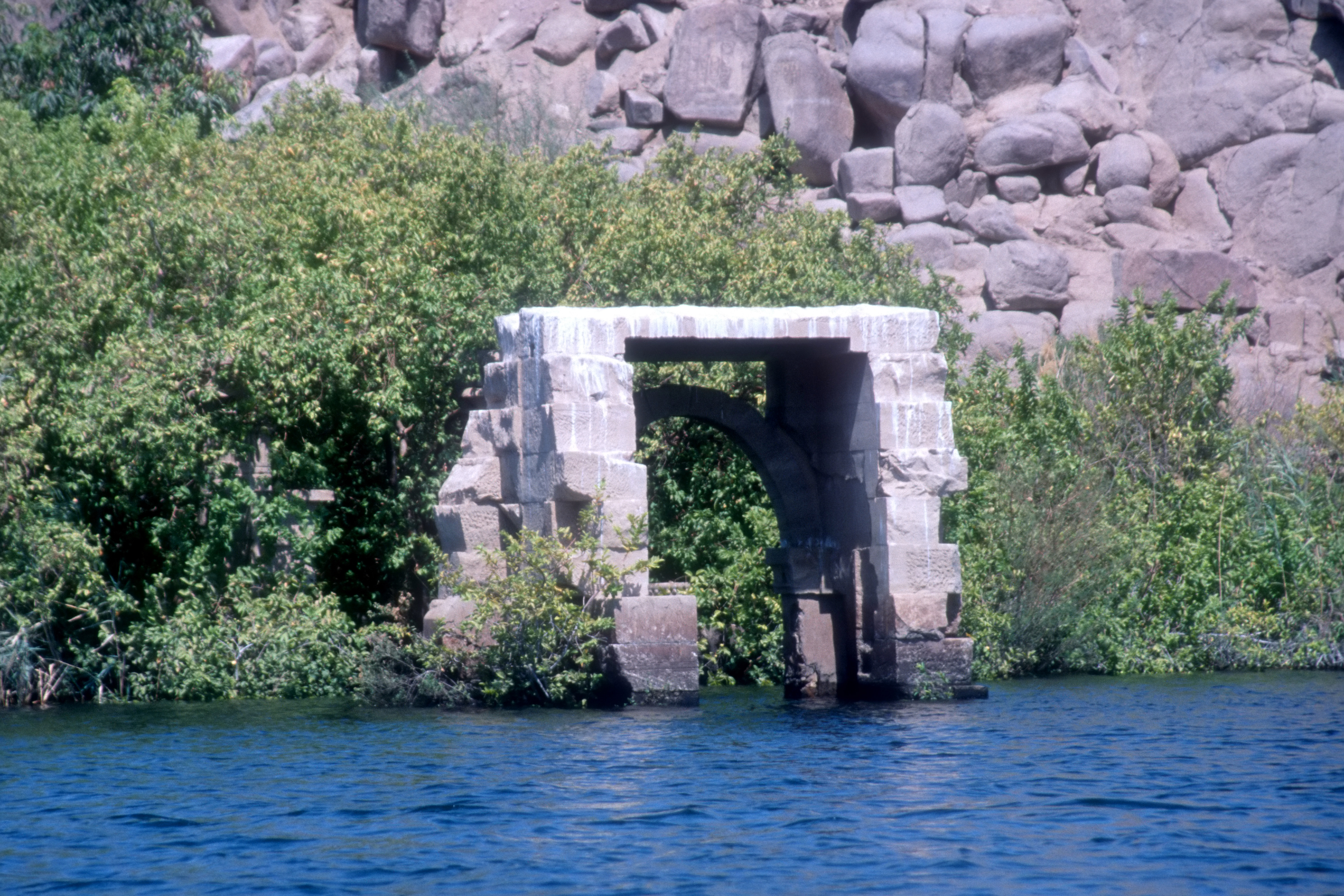
Bigeh ruins today

== Description and contributions ==
=== Abu Simbel ===
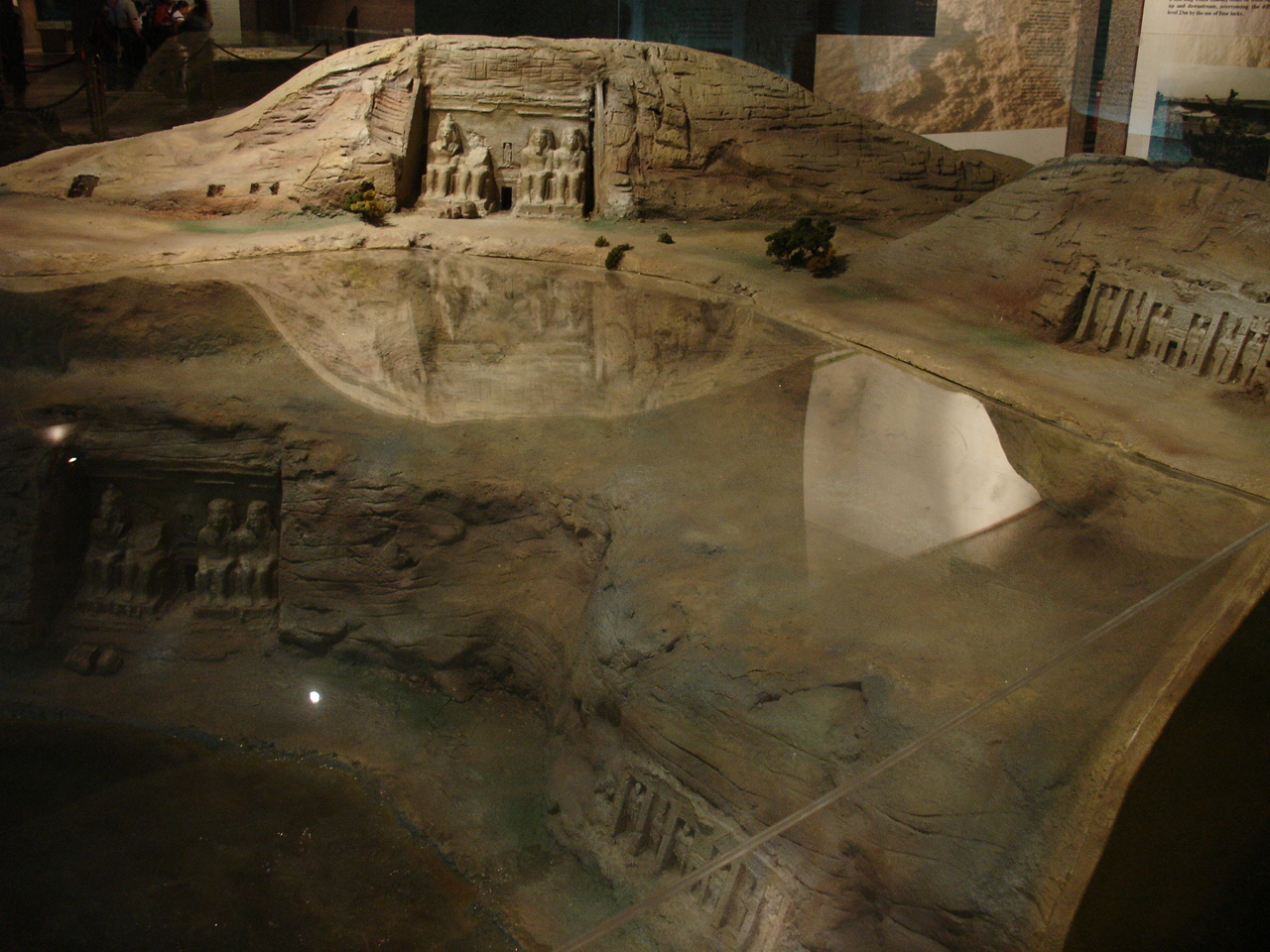
A scale model showing the original and current location of the temple (with respect to the water level) at the Nubian Museum, in Aswan

One scheme to save the Abu Simbel temples was based on an idea by William MacQuitty to build a clear freshwater dam around the temples, with the water inside kept at the same height as the Nile. There were to be underwater viewing chambers. In 1962 the idea was made into a proposal by architects Jane Drew and Maxwell Fry and civil engineer Ove Arup. They considered that raising the temples ignored the effect of erosion of the sandstone by desert winds. However, the proposal, though acknowledged to be extremely elegant, was rejected.

The salvage of the Abu Simbel temples began in 1964 by a multinational team of archeologists, engineers and skilled heavy equipment operators working together under the UNESCO banner; it cost some US$40 million (equivalent to $632 million in 2024). Between 1964 and 1968, the entire site was carefully cut into large blocks (up to 30 tons, averaging 20 tons), dismantled, lifted and reassembled in a new location 65 metres higher and 200 metres back from the river, in one of the greatest challenges of archaeological engineering in history. Some structures were even saved from under the waters of Lake Nasser.

=== Amada ===
The Temple of Amada was a difficult case, because of its small, beautifully painted reliefs and was considered "one of the most distinctive and best preserved examples of the art of the 18th dynasty." Desroches Noblecourt announced that France would save it. However, more funds were needed for this project. To this end Desroches Noblecourt requested an interview with Charles de Gaulle, who had no idea of the commitment she had made in the name of her country. Reportedly on learning of it, he demanded, "Madame, how dare you say that France will save the temple, without authorization from my government?" Noblecourt replied, "General, how dare you make an appeal on the radio without authorization from Pétain?" De Gaulle agreed to honour Noblecourt's promise.

As well as providing funding the French government provided significant technical support for the removal of the Temple of Amada. In 1964, the front portion of the temple was dismantled and transported on rails by the U.A.R. Antiquities Service. French archeologists then excavated the rest of the temple with the same railway system.

=== Philae ===
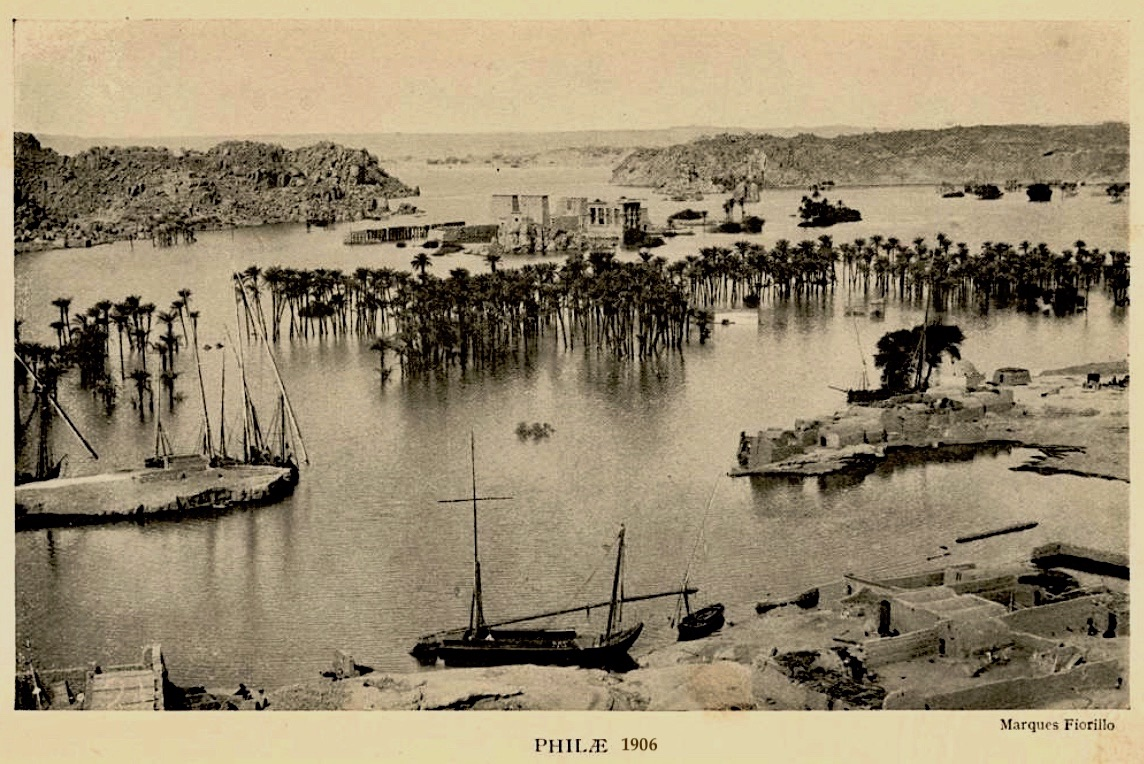
Philae flooded by the Aswan Low Dam in 1906.

In 1902, the Aswan Low Dam was completed on the Nile River by the British. This threatened to submerge many ancient landmarks, including the temple complex of Philae. The height of the dam was raised twice, from 1907 to 1912 and from 1929 to 1934, and the island of Philae was nearly always flooded. In fact, the only times that the complex was not underwater was when the dam's sluices were open from July to October. During this period it was proposed that the temples be relocated, piece by piece, to nearby islands, such as Bigeh or Elephantine. However, the temples' foundations and other architectural supporting structures were strengthened instead. Although the buildings were physically secure, the island's attractive vegetation and the colors of the temples' reliefs were washed away. Also, the bricks of the Philae temples soon became encrusted with silt and other debris carried by the Nile. With each inundation the situation worsened and in the 1960s the island was submerged up to a third of the buildings all year round.

The work began in 1972, and in 1974 a large coffer dam was built, constructed of two rows of steel plates between which a 1 million cubic metres (35 million cubic feet) of sand was tipped. Any water that seeped through was pumped away. Next the monuments were cleaned and measured, by using photogrammetry, a method that enables the exact reconstruction of the original size of the building blocks that were used by the ancients. Then every building was dismantled into about 40,000 units from 2 to 25 tons, and then transported to the nearby Island of Agilkia, situated on higher ground some 500 metres (1,600 ft) away. Foundations of the Philae monuments were ready on Agilkia by April 1977, and the transfer itself took place between 1977 and 1980.

=== Individual Egyptian campaigns ===
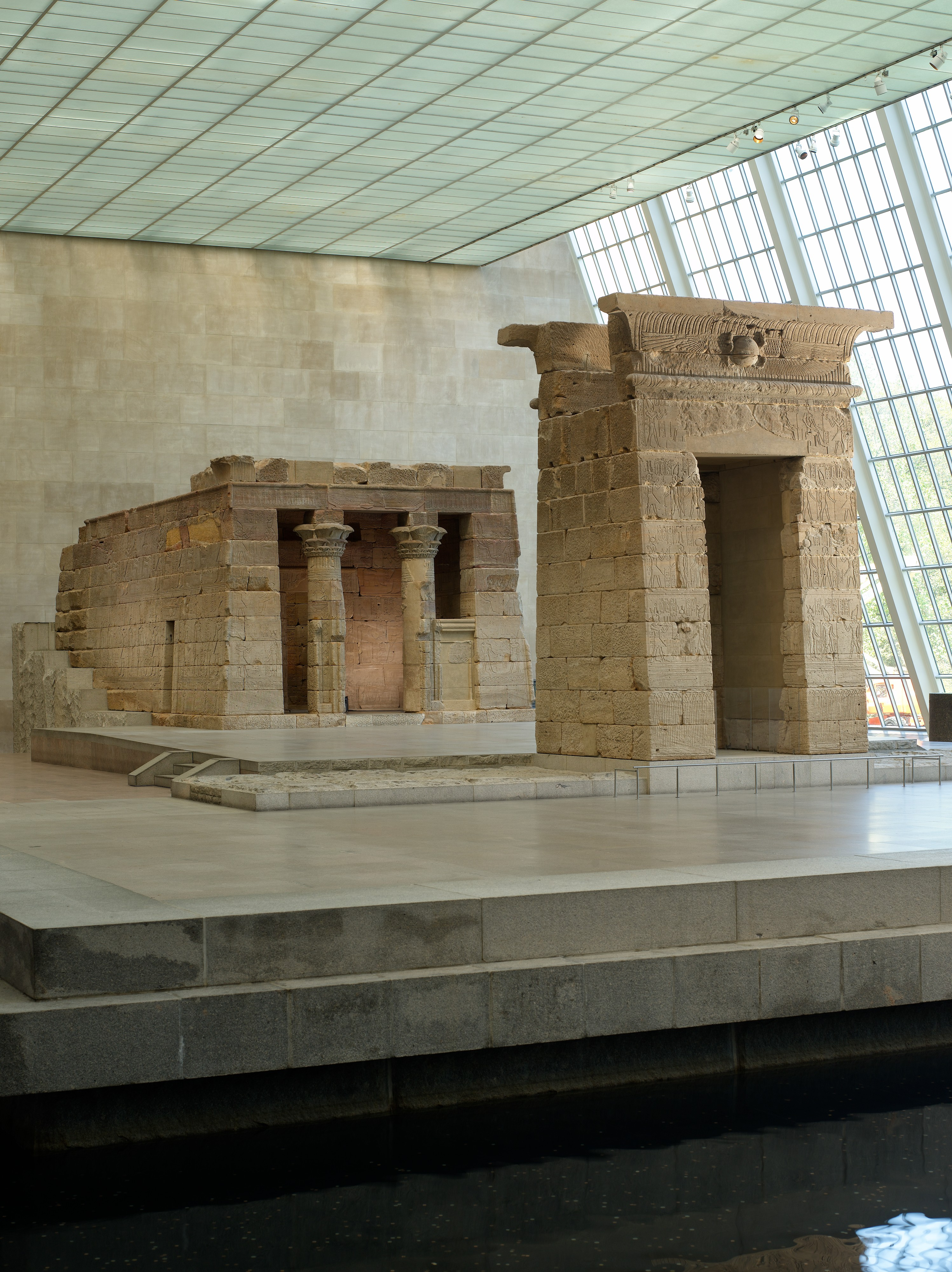
The Temple of Dendur at the Metropolitan Museum of Art in New York

In addition to participating directly in the high-profile salvage operations of Abu Simbel and Philae, the Egyptian Antiquities Organization carried out the rescue of many smaller temples and monuments alone using their own financial and technical means. As early as 1960 Egypt had started to rescue the temples of Taffeh (or Taffa), Debod and Qertassi, followed by Dakka and Maharraqa in 1961 and Dendur in 1962. The temples of Wadi es-Sebua and Beit el Wali and the rock tomb of Pennut at Aniba were moved in 1964 with the support of a US grant, whilst the subsequent re-erection was carried out with Egyptian resources. The Temple of Derr was rescued in 1965, and the temples of Gerf Husein, the chapel of Abu Oda (cut out of rock), the chapels of Qasr Ibrim (the rest of which has remained in situ), and many rock inscriptions and drawings, were also saved. Because many of the temples were converted to churches in the 6th century, and many still had remnants of the Christian paintings at the time of relocation, in the process of dismantling the temples into blocks for relocation, the remaining Christian wall paintings were destroyed, revealing the ancient Egyptian art beneath.

=== West German operation at Kalabsha ===
Early in the campaign, the West German authorities offered to dismantle and re-erect the Temple of Kalabsha, the largest temple in all of Lower Nubia, with costs paid by West Germany. Germany's interest in making a significant contribution stemmed from its Egyptological heritage, including Lepsius' milestone work Denkmäler aus Ägypten und Äthiopien, as more specifically the work of Franz Christian Gau who had documented Kalabsha as early as 1819.

=== Wider archaeological campaign ===
Given the impending flooding of a wide area, Egypt and Sudan encouraged archaeological teams from across the world to carry out work as broadly as possible. Approximately 40 teams from across the world came to the region, to explore an area of approximately 500 km in length.

In addition to the relocation operations, many countries participated in excavation and preservation work. Some of this work took place at the CEDAE (Centre d'Étude et de Documentation sur l'Ancienne Égypte, in English the Documentation and Study Centre for the History of the Art and Civilization of Ancient Egypt), founded in Cairo in 1955 to coordinate the academic efforts:

- Egypt: Five campaigns by the University of Cairo at Aniba. One campaign by the University of Alexandria at Gebel Adda. Eight excavation campaigns by the Antiquities Service on various sites. Three campaigns by the Antiquities Service for cutting out rock drawings. Removal of eight monuments, work in two others, dismantling of the front part of the temple of Amada and financial contribution to the work for saving this temple and those of Wadi es-Sebua, Beit el-Wali and Aniba.
- Sudan: Since 1960, successive expeditions by the Antiquities Service, led by a UNESCO expert, for a general survey of Sudanese Nubia; excavations at some of the most important sites.
- Argentina: Three archaeological campaigns in the Sudan by the National University of La Plata
- Austria: Six archaeological campaigns in Egypt by the University of Vienna, in Egypt. Sending of an epigraphist to the CEDAE.
- Belgium: Sending of three experts to the CEDAE. Photogrammetric and epigraphic records of five monuments in the Sudan. Contribution to the cost of transferring the temple of Semna, Sudan.
- Canada: One archaeological campaign in Egypt by the Royal Ontario Museum
- Czechoslovakia: Five expeditions in Egypt by the Institute of Classical Archaeology of Charles University
- Denmark, Finland, Norway, Sweden: Four campaigns in Sudan by a joint mission. Finland alone: General surveying to the south of Gemai (near Wadi Halfa in Sudan).
- France: Six campaigns in Egypt by the Institut Français d'Archéologie Orientale. Two campaigns in Egypt by the University of Strasbourg. Photogrammetric study. Sending of nine experts to the CEDAE. Removal and reconstruction of the Temple of Amada, together with Egypt. Seven campaigns in Sudan by the Commission Nationale des Fouilles". Payment of the costs involved in transferring the temple of Aksha, Sudan
- West Germany: Three campaigns by the German Archaeological Institute
- East Germany: Expeditions by the German National Academy of Sciences Leopoldina to record the rock inscriptions and drawings and the ground-plan of the ruins of Attiri, Sudan.
- Ghana: Three campaigns in the Sudan by the University of Ghana
- Hungary: One campaign in Egypt by Museum of Fine Arts (Budapest)
- India: One campaign in Egypt by the Archaeological Survey of India
- Italy: Six campaigns in Egypt by the University of Milan, as well as the sending of three experts to the CEDAE. One campaign in Egypt by the Sapienza University of Rome. Three campaigns in Egypt by Museo Egizio (Turin), including financial contribution from city and museum for cutting out of the chapel of the Temple of Ellesyia. Experimental work with sounding methods by the Fondazione Lerici.
- Netherlands: Two campaigns by the National Museum of Antiquities, Leiden, in Egypt: excavations of Abdallah Nirqi (early Christian village, church with painted decoration) and of Shokan (late Meroitic village). Preliminary studies for saving the Island of Philae. Contribution to the cost of saving the temple of Kumna (Sudan).
- Poland: One campaign in Egypt and four in Sudan by the Polish Centre of Mediterranean Archaeology University of Warsaw. Sending of four architects to the CEDAE.
- Spain: Four excavation campaigns and four campaigns to record and cut out rock inscriptions, in Egypt. Three excavation campaigns, in the Sudan.
- Switzerland: Two excavation campaigns in Egypt by the Schweizerisches Institut für Ägyptische Bauforschung und Altertumskunde in Cairo, one in co-operation with the University of Chicago, and one in co-operation with the Institut Français d'Archéologie Orientale. Architectural records of a temple and leadership of the Antiquities service expedition to cut out rock inscriptions in 1964. Sending of an expert to the CEDAE by the Swiss National Science Foundation.
- United Kingdom: Four campaigns in Egypt and two in Sudan by the Egypt Exploration Society. Two campaigns by the Egypt Exploration Society and the University of London for the general survey of Nubia. Sending of two experts to the CEDAE. Sending of an epigraphist (in co-operation with Brown University). Contribution to the dismantling of the temple of Buhen.
- United States: In Egypt: Four campaigns by the University of Chicago in Egypt, including one in co-operation with the Swiss Institute of Architectural Research. Complete surveying and recording of a temple by the University of Chicago. Four campaigns by Yale and Pennsylvania Universities. Pre-history research on the Abu Simbel site by Columbia University. Four campaigns by Yale University. Sending of an epigraphist by Brown University (Provi-dence) in collaboration with the Egypt Exploration Society. Four campaigns by the Museum of New Mexico (pre-history survey). Four campaigns by the American Research Centre. Contribution by the United States Government for saving the temples of Beit el- Wali, Wadi es-Sebua and Aniba. In Sudan: Three excavation campaigns by the University of Chicago. One pre-history survey campaign by Columbia University. Three pre-history survey campaigns by the Museum of New Mexico. Two excavation campaigns and one architectural survey campaign by the University of California. Sending of an epigraphist by Brown University (Providence). Three pre-history investigation campaigns by the University of Colorado Museum. Contribution by the United States Government for the transfer and re-erection of the temple of Buhen.
- Soviet Union: One survey and excavation campaign, in Egypt. General surveying and recording of rock inscriptions, in Egypt.
- Yugoslavia: Sending of two architects to the CEDAE. Removal of Christian wall paintings (two experts), in Egypt. Removal of Christian wall paintings (two experts), in the Sudan.

=== Financial contributions ===
The table below summarises the contributions towards the project by the global coalition of nations. The vast majority of these contributions funded the operations at Abu Simbel and Philae.

Contributor	USD (thousands)	Notes
Afghanistan	2	Government contribution
Algeria	105	Government contribution
Austria	37	Government contribution
Belgium	82	Government contribution
China	2	Government contribution
Cuba	160	Government contribution
Cyprus	5	Government contribution
Denmark	15	Government contribution
France	1,268	Government contribution
West Germany	678	Government contribution
Ghana	49	Government contribution
Greece	30	Government contribution
Holy See	35	Government contribution
Indonesia	10	Government contribution
Iraq	63	Government contribution
Italy	1,176	Government contribution
Japan	190	Government contribution
Cambodia	5	Government contribution
Kuwait	105	Government contribution
Lebanon	40	Government contribution
Libya	26	Government contribution
Luxembourg	2	Government contribution
Malaysia	14	Government contribution
Mali	2	Government contribution
Malta	0.2	Government contribution
Monaco	10	Government contribution
Morocco	4	Government contribution
Nepal	1	Government contribution
Netherlands	557	Government contribution
Nigeria	128	Government contribution
Pakistan	130	Government contribution
Philippines	10	Government contribution
Qatar	60	Government contribution
Saudi Arabia	8	Government contribution
Sierra Leone	3	Government contribution
Spain	525	Government contribution
Sri Lanka	1	Government contribution
Sudan	2	Government contribution
Sweden	500	Government contribution
Switzerland	332	Government contribution
Syria	152	Government contribution
Togo	1	Government contribution
Turkey	3	Government contribution
Uganda	6	Government contribution
United Kingdom	213	Government contribution
United States	18,501	Government contribution
Yugoslavia	226	Government contribution
India (in kind)	415	Government contribution
Romania (in kind)	5	Government contribution
Total Government contribution	25,893	Government contribution
Miscellaneous private contributions	36	Private contributions
American Committee for the Preservation of Abu Simbel	1,251	Private contributions
African Emergency Programme	21	Private contributions
Belgium exhibition proceeds	154	Private contributions
Canada exhibition proceeds	4	Private contributions
France exhibition proceeds	459	Private contributions
West Germany exhibition proceeds	1,208	Private contributions
Japan exhibition proceeds	1,089	Private contributions
Norway exhibition proceeds	6	Private contributions
Sweden exhibition proceeds	29	Private contributions
UK exhibition proceeds	1,601	Private contributions
USSR exhibition proceeds	1,602	Private contributions
Sovereign Order of Malta	1	
Egypt Tourist Tax	1,879	Other Income
Interest and exchange adjustments	1,408	Other Income
World Food Programme	3,518	Other Income
Philatelic revenue and income from Philae Medals	113	Other Income
Grand total	40,273	

== World Heritage Site ==
In April 1979, the monuments were inscribed on the World Heritage List as the "Nubian Monuments from Abu Simbel to Philae". The inscribed area includes ten sites, five of which were relocated (all south of the city of Aswan), and five of which remain in their original position (near to the city of Aswan):

Relocated sites, south of the Aswan Low Dam

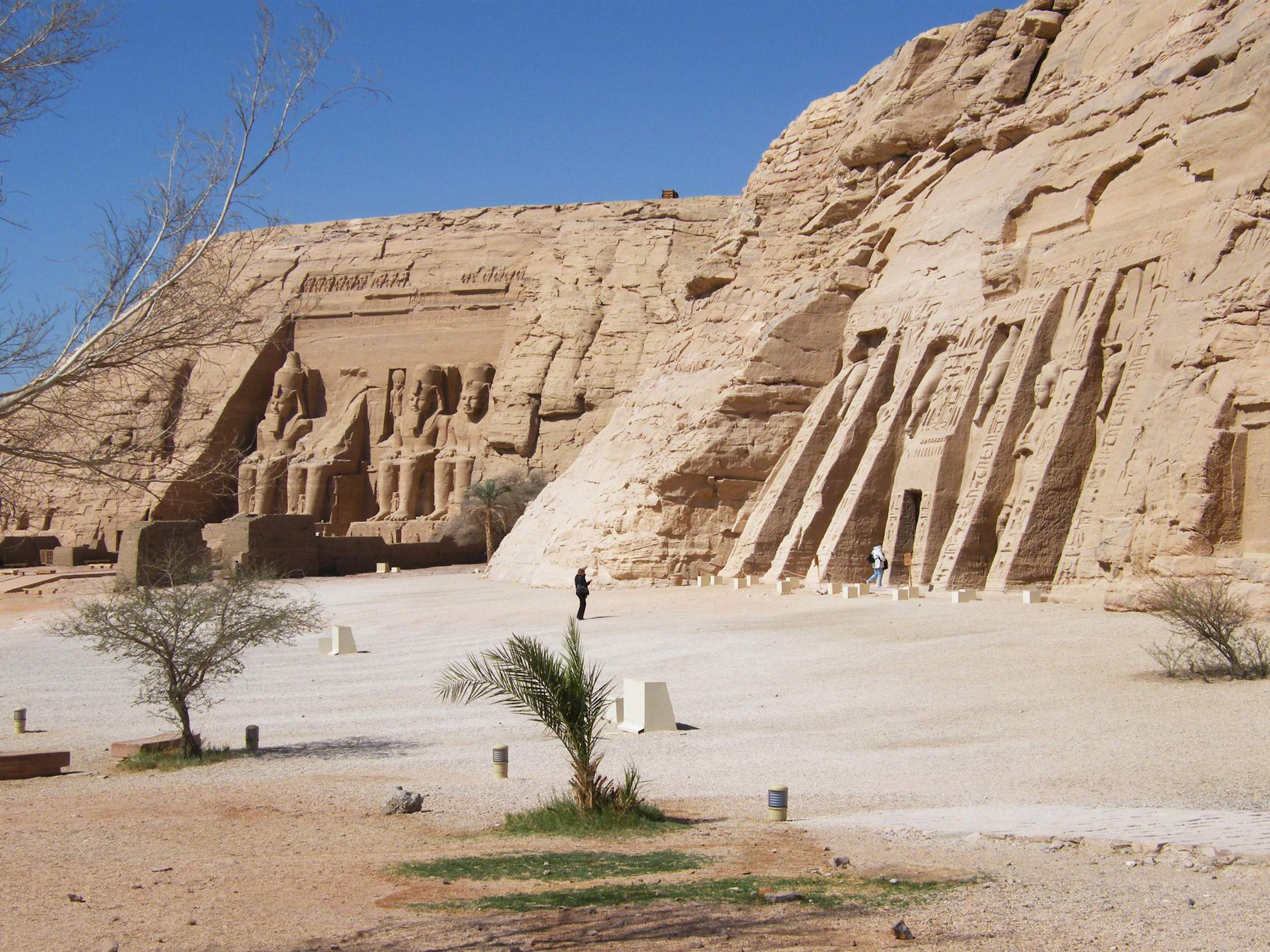
The relocated Abu Simbel monuments

- Abu Simbel
- New Amada
- New Wadi Sebua
- New Kalabsha
- Philae temple complex (Agilkia Island)

Sites in their original location, north of the Aswan Low Dam – although these five sites are grouped within the "Nubian Monuments from Abu Simbel to Philae", they are neither Nubian, nor between Abu Simbel and Philae

- Qubbet el-Hawa (Old and Middle Kingdom Tombs)
- Ruins of town of Elephantine
- Stone quarries and Unfinished obelisk, Aswan
- Monastery of St. Simeon, Aswan
- Fatimid Cemetery of Aswan

== Gallery ==
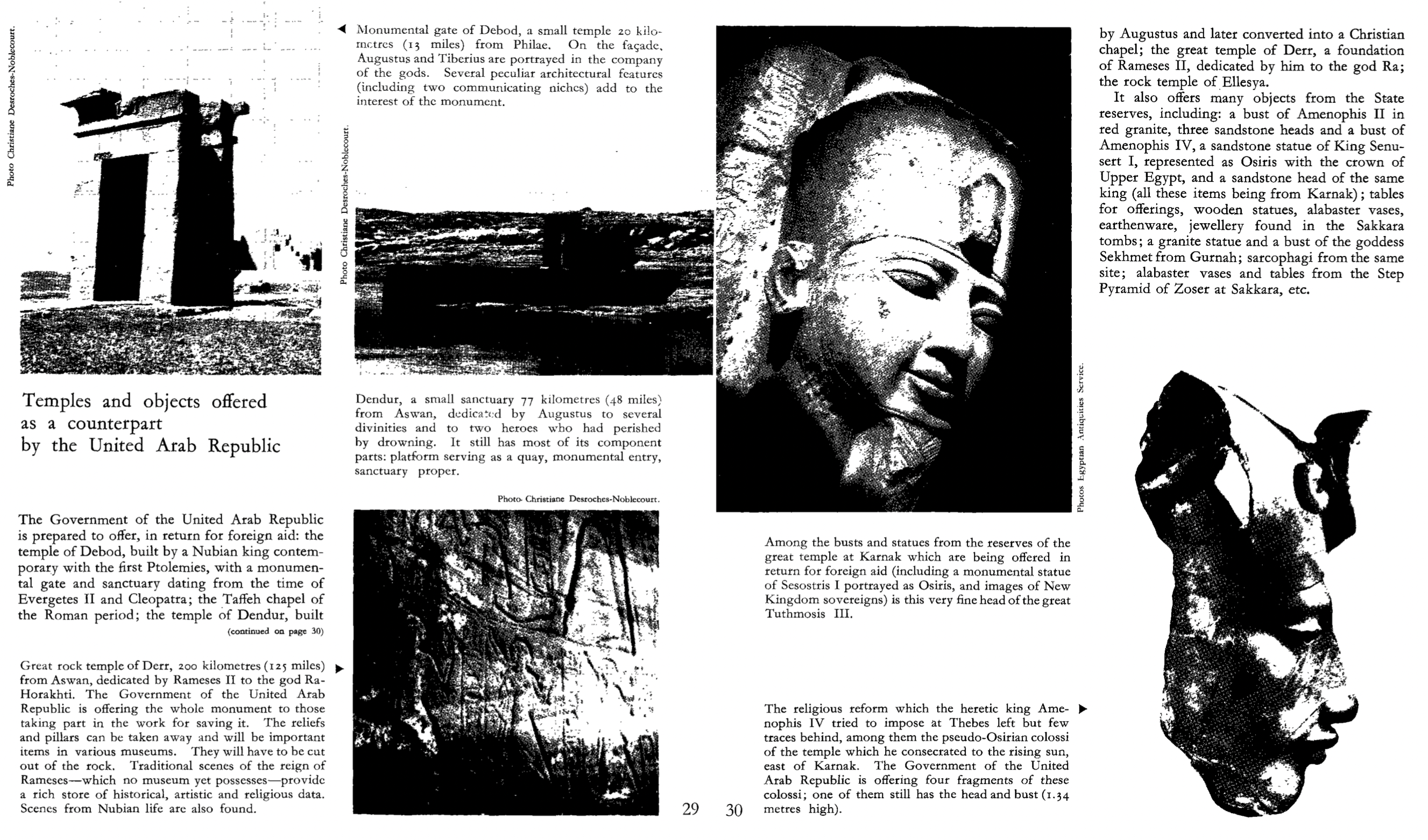
Egyptian Government offer to gift monuments overseas in the 1960 UNESCO Courier

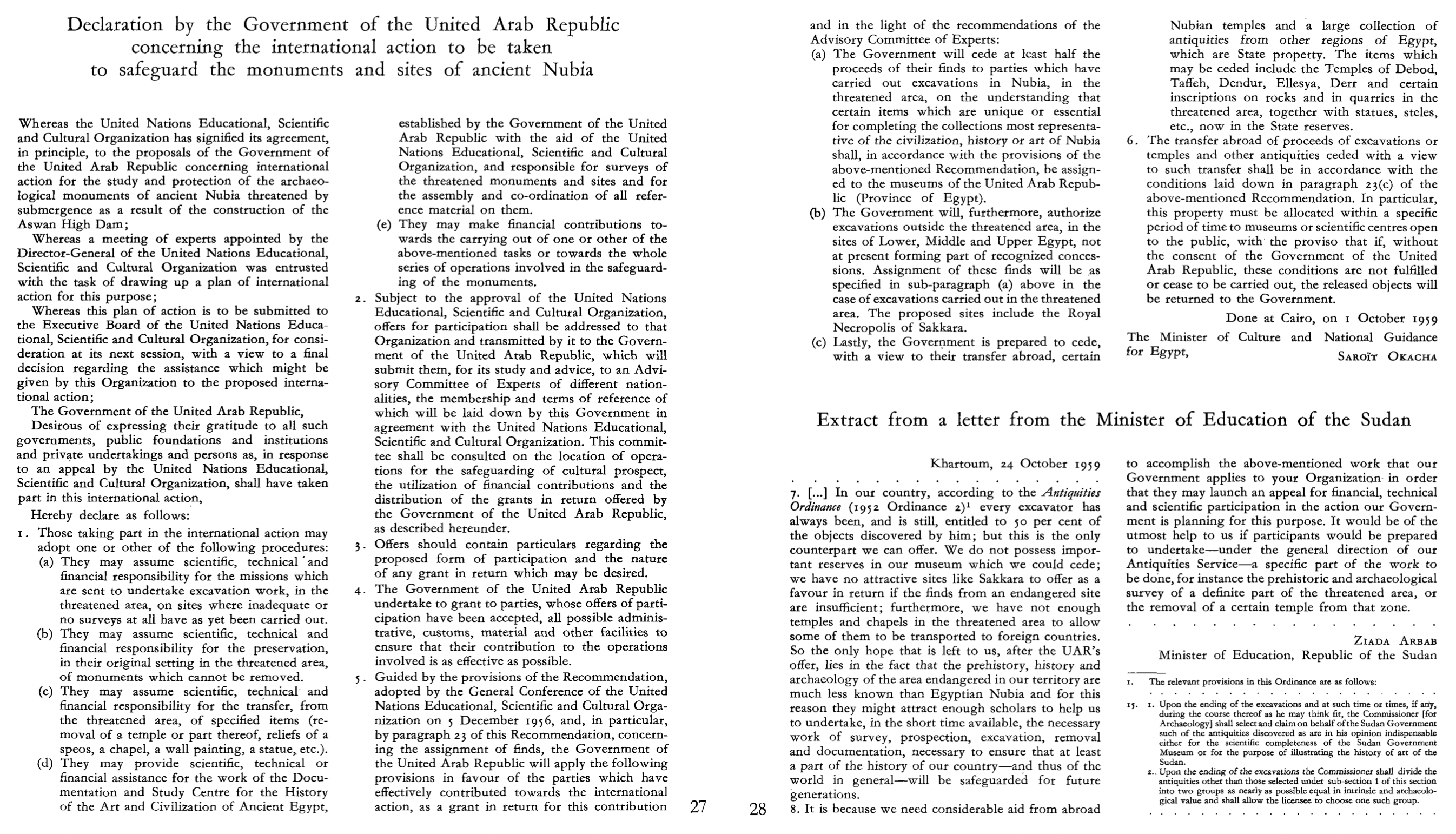
Egyptian and Sudanese declarations in the 1960 UNESCO Courier

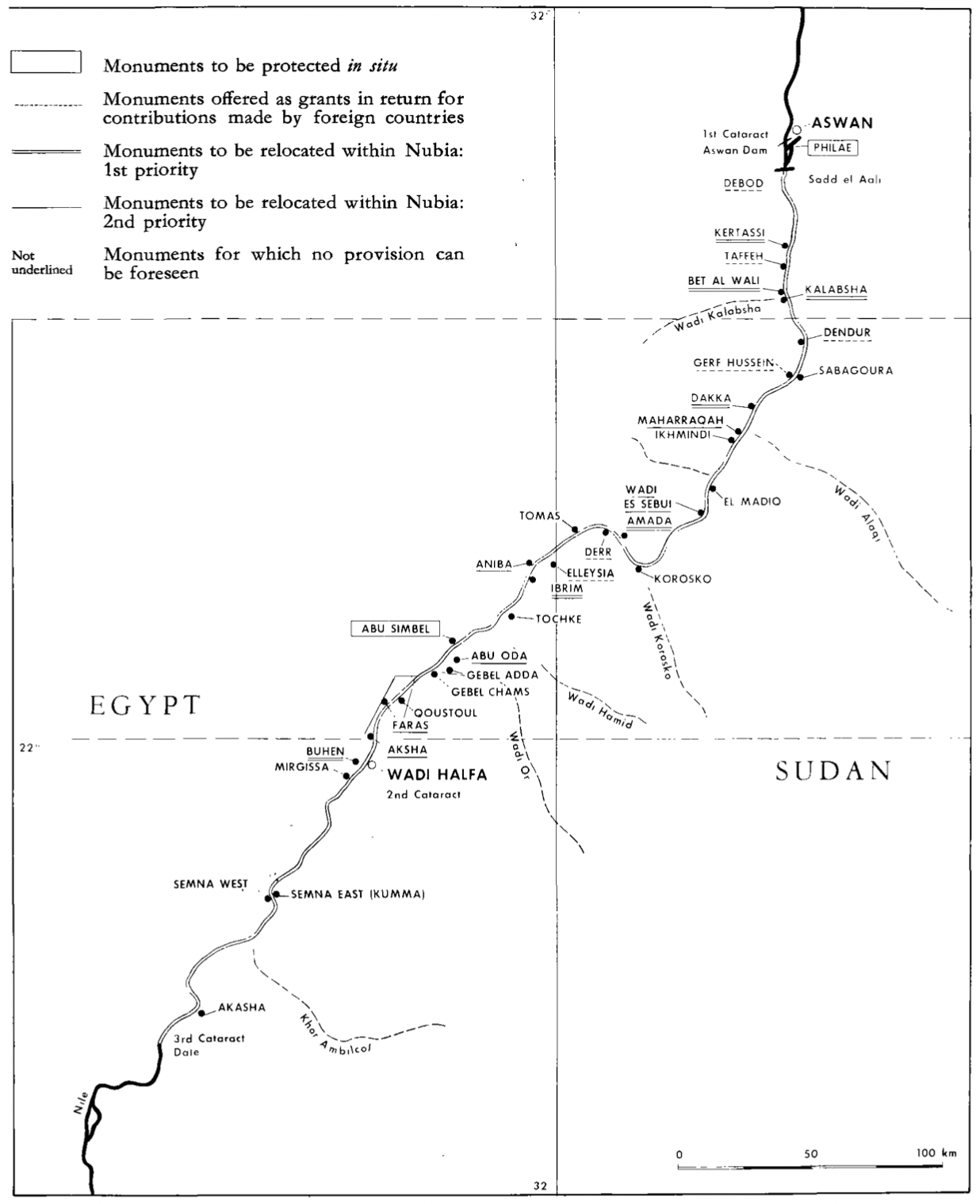
List of monuments at risk in the 1960 UNESCO Courier

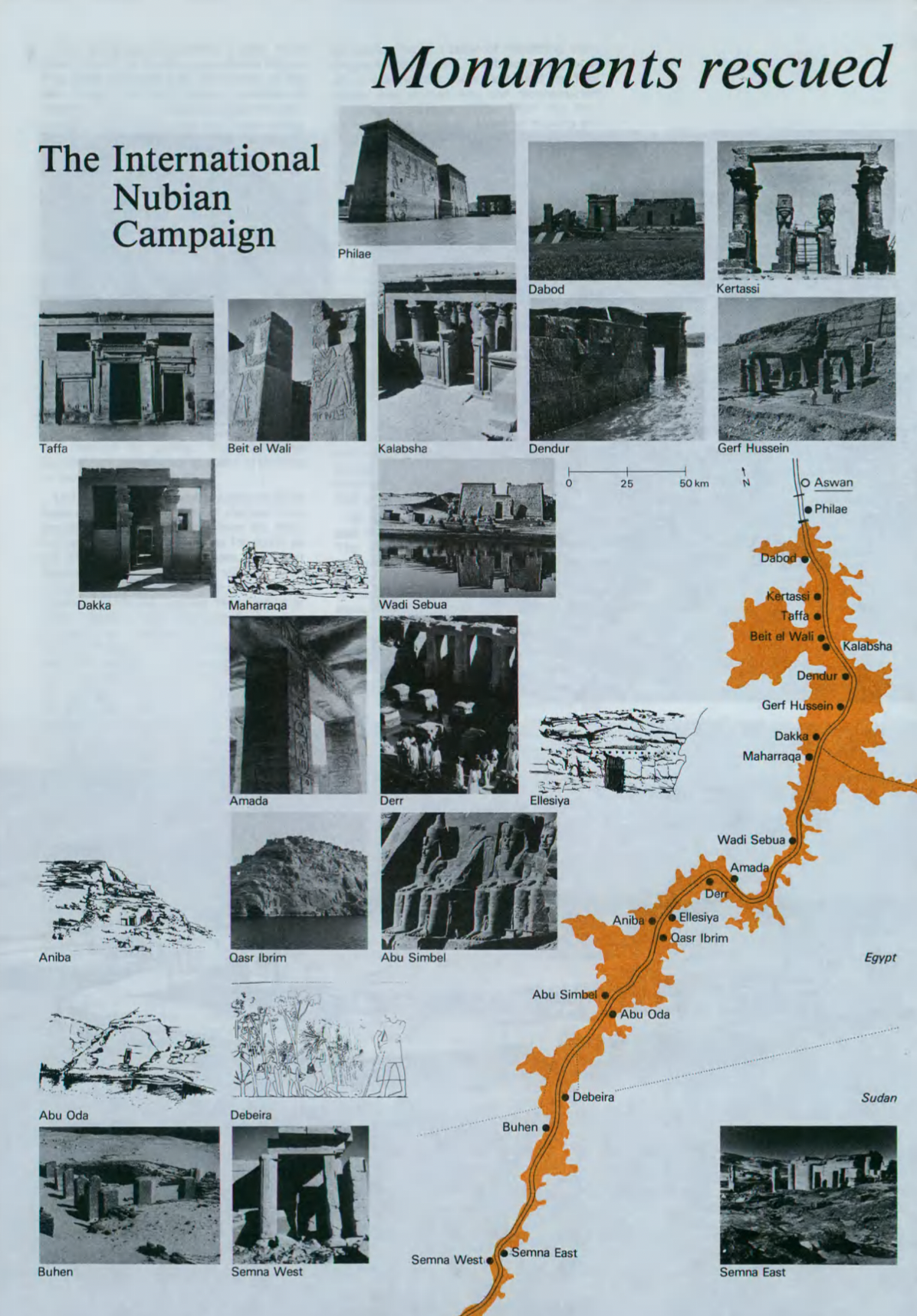
List of monuments relocated in the 1980 UNESCO Courier

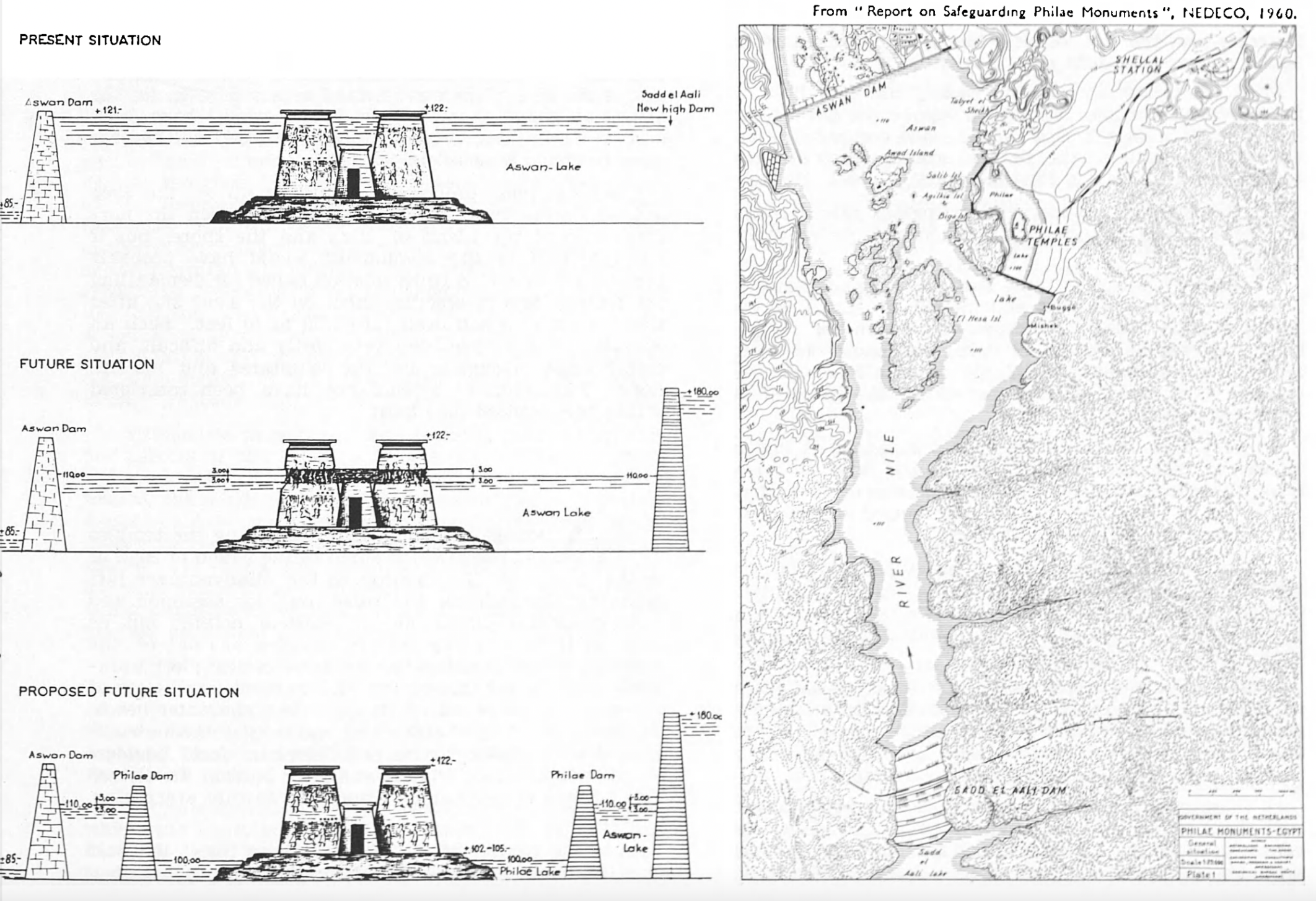
Philae Island in the 1961 UNESCO Courier

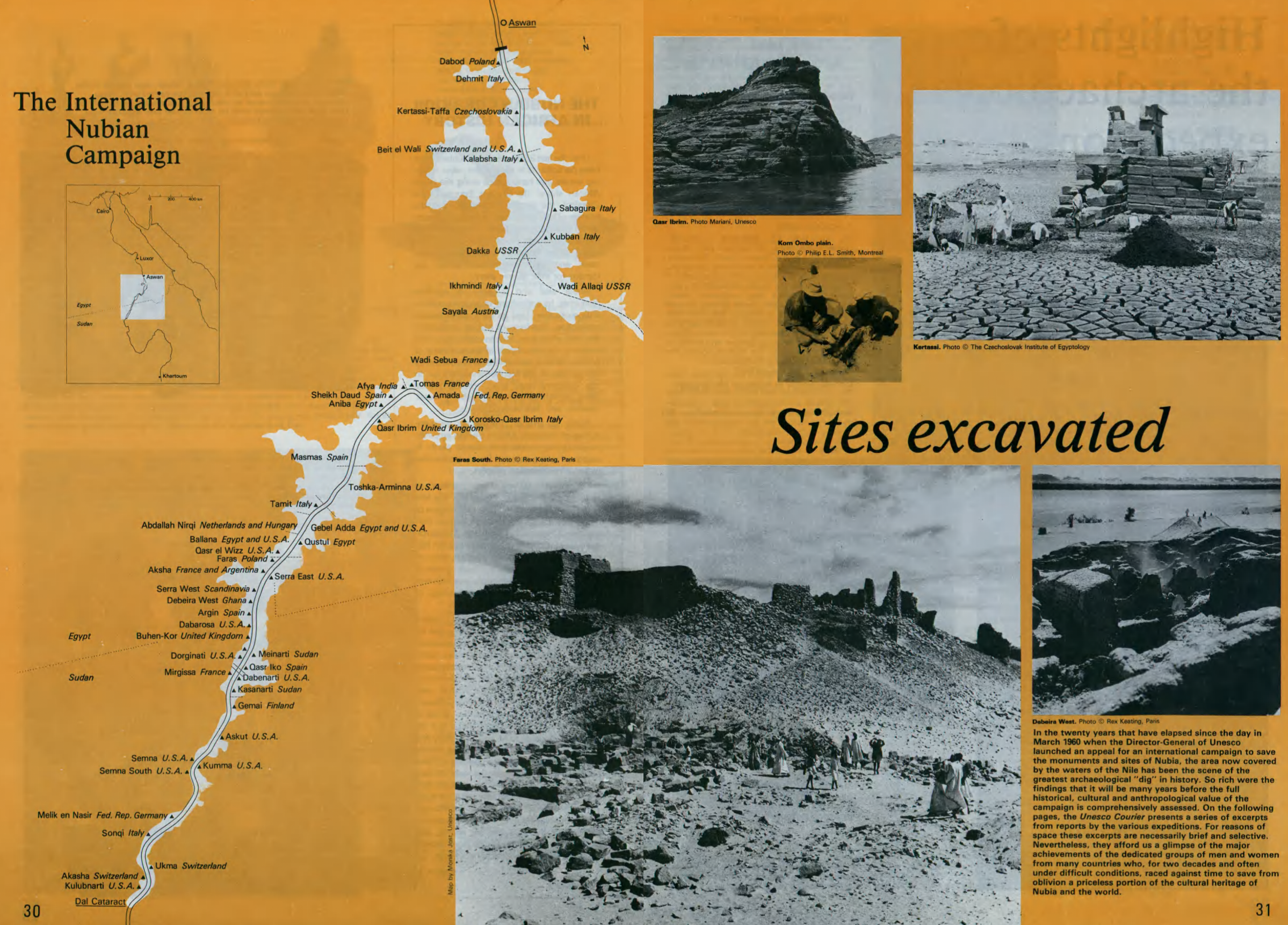
List of sites excavated in addition to the monuments relocated in the 1980 UNESCO Courier

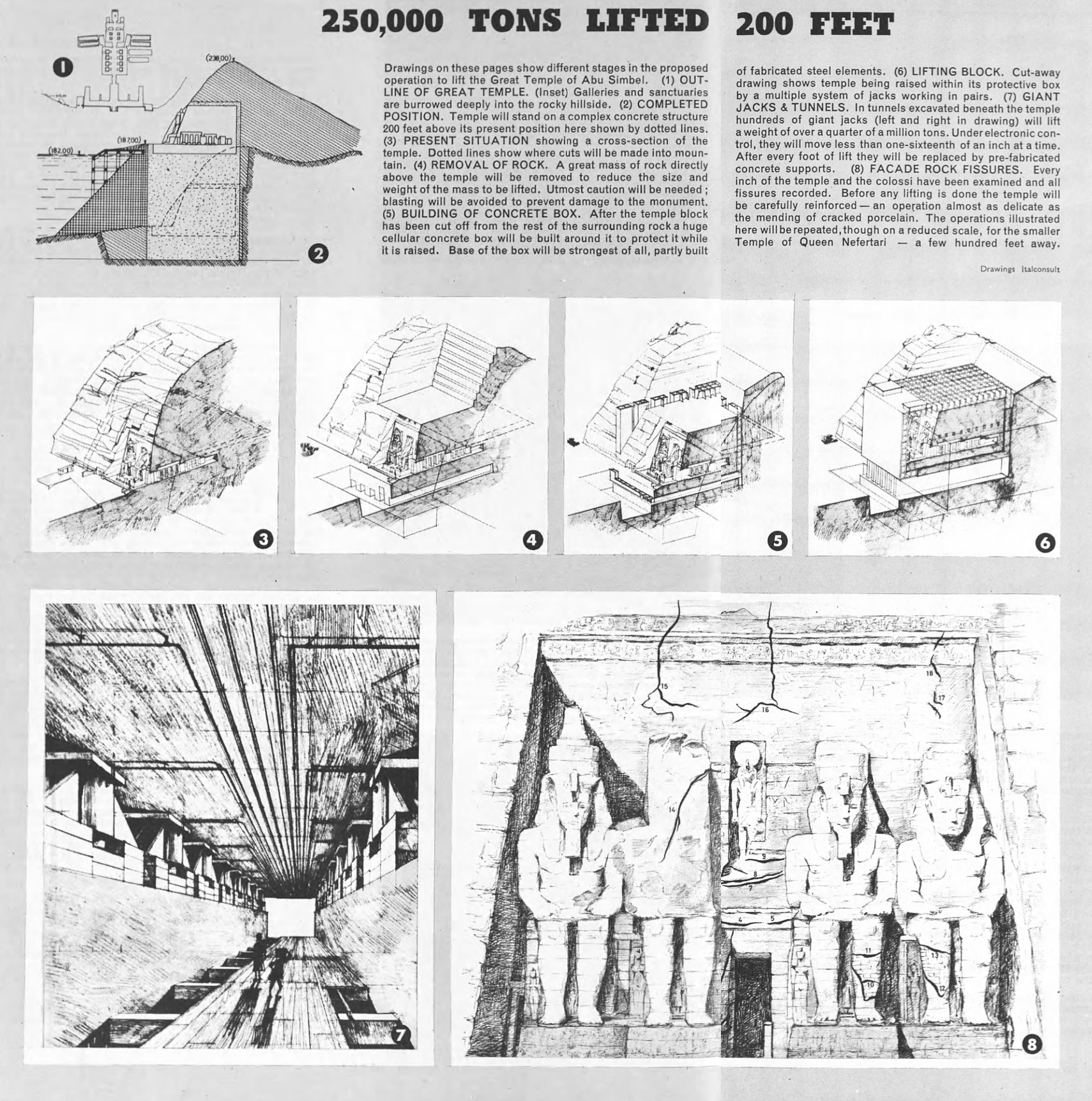
Abu Simbel in the 1961 UNESCO Courier

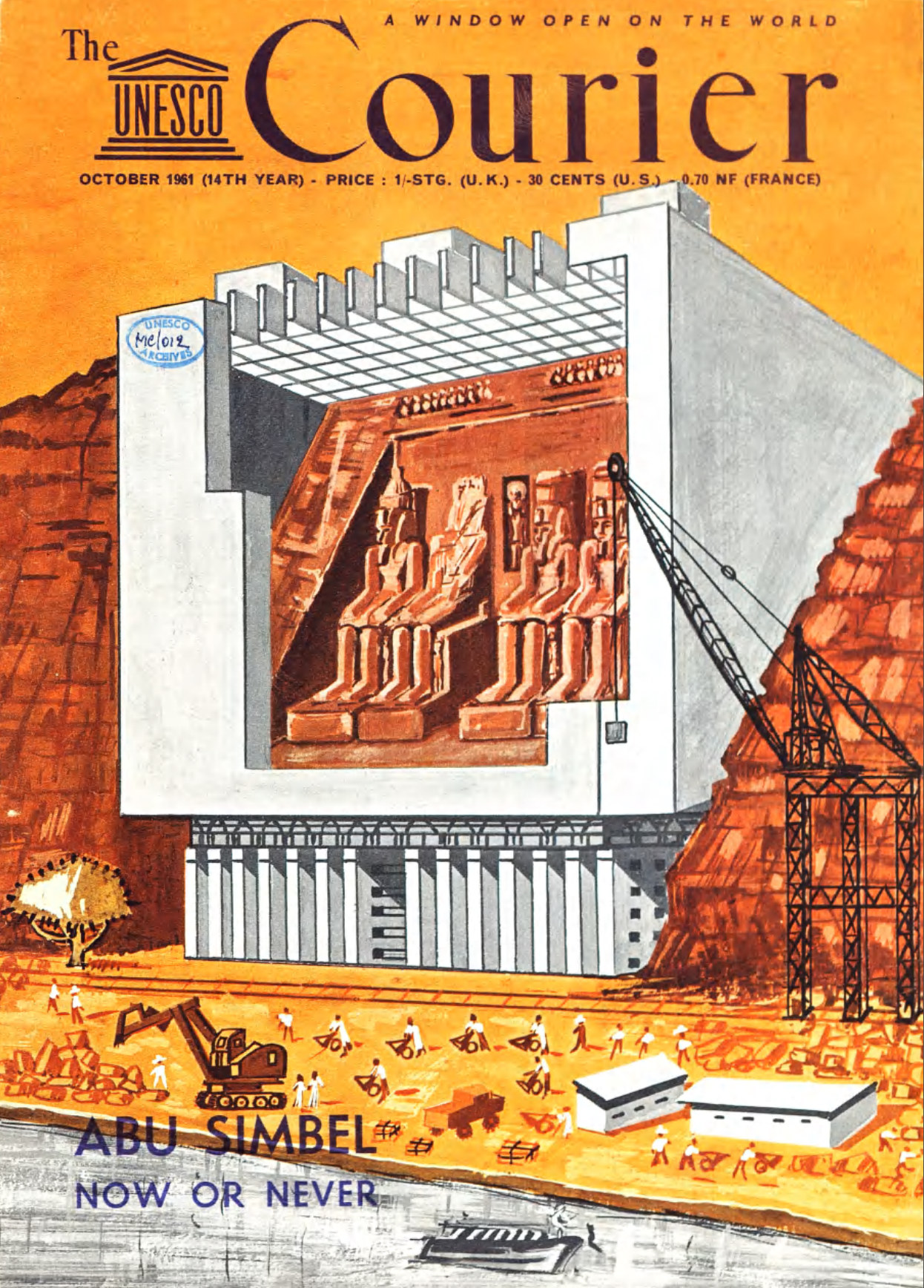
1961 UNESCO Courier

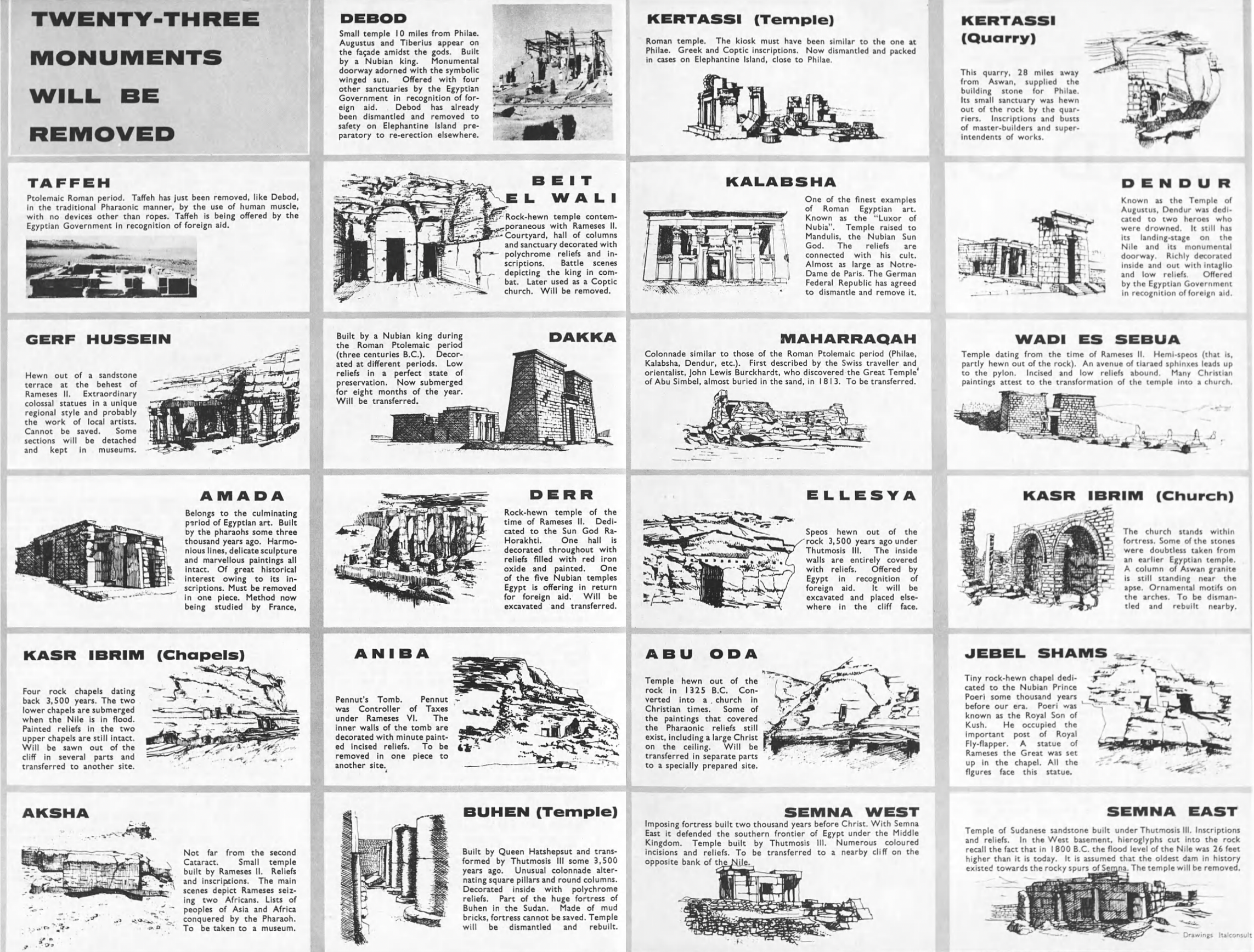
List of Monuments to be Relocated in the 1961 UNESCO Courier

== See also ==
- Tabqa Dam § Rescue excavations in the Lake Assad region

== Bibliography ==
=== UNESCO publications ===
- A Common trust: the preservation of the ancient monuments of Nubia, 1960, UNESCO CUA.60/D.22/A
- Save the treasures of Nubia: UNESCO launches a world appeal, 1960, UNESCO Courier
- Abu Simbel: now or never, 1961, UNESCO Courier
- Nubia's sands reveal their last secrets, 1964, UNESCO Courier
- Victory in Nubia: the greatest archaeological rescue operation of all time, 1980, UNESCO Courier
- Säve-Söderbergh, Torgny (1987). Temples and Tombs of Ancient Nubia: The International Rescue Campaign at Abu Simbel, Philae and Other Sites. Thames and Hudson. ISBN 978-92-3-102383-5.
- Success stories, 2019, UNESCO.

=== Other publications ===
- Allais, Lucia (2012). "The Design of the Nubian Desert: Monuments, Mobility, and the Space of Global Culture". Governing by Design: Architecture, Economy, and Politics in the Twentieth Century. The Aggregate Architectural History Collaborative. University of Pittsburgh Press. pp. 179ff. ISBN 978-0-8229-7789-6. See also:
- De Simone, Maria Costanza, ed. (2024). Remembering the Nubia Campaign. Recollections and Evaluations of the 'International Campaign to Save the Monuments of Nubia' After Fifty Years (Hardcover). Culture and History of the Ancient Near East. Vol. 141. Leiden, Boston: Brill. ISBN 978-90-04-71393-2.
- Desroches-Noblecourt, Christiane (1993). La Grande Nubiade ou Le parcours d'une égyptologue. Le Livre de poche (in French). Stock. ISBN 978-2-253-06366-7.
- Larson, J.A. (2006). Lost Nubia: A Centennial Exhibit of Photographs from the 1905–1907 Egyptian Expedition of the University of Chicago (PDF). Oriental Institute Museum publications. Oriental Institute. ISBN 978-1-885923-45-5.
- Olson, Lynne (2023). Empress of the Nile: The Daredevil Archaeologist Who Saved Egypt's Ancient Temples from Destruction (Hardcover). New York: Random House. ISBN 978-0525509479.
- Zurinaga Fernández-Toribio, Salomé (6 January 2017). "Rescue Archaeology and Spanish Journalism: The Abu Simbel Operation". AP: Online Journal in Public Archaeology. 3. JAS Arqueologia: 46. doi:10.23914/ap.v3i0.29. ISSN 2171-6315.
