= Aniba (Nubia) =

Village in Nubia, ancient Egyptian archaeological site

Coordinates: 22°43′N 32°00′E

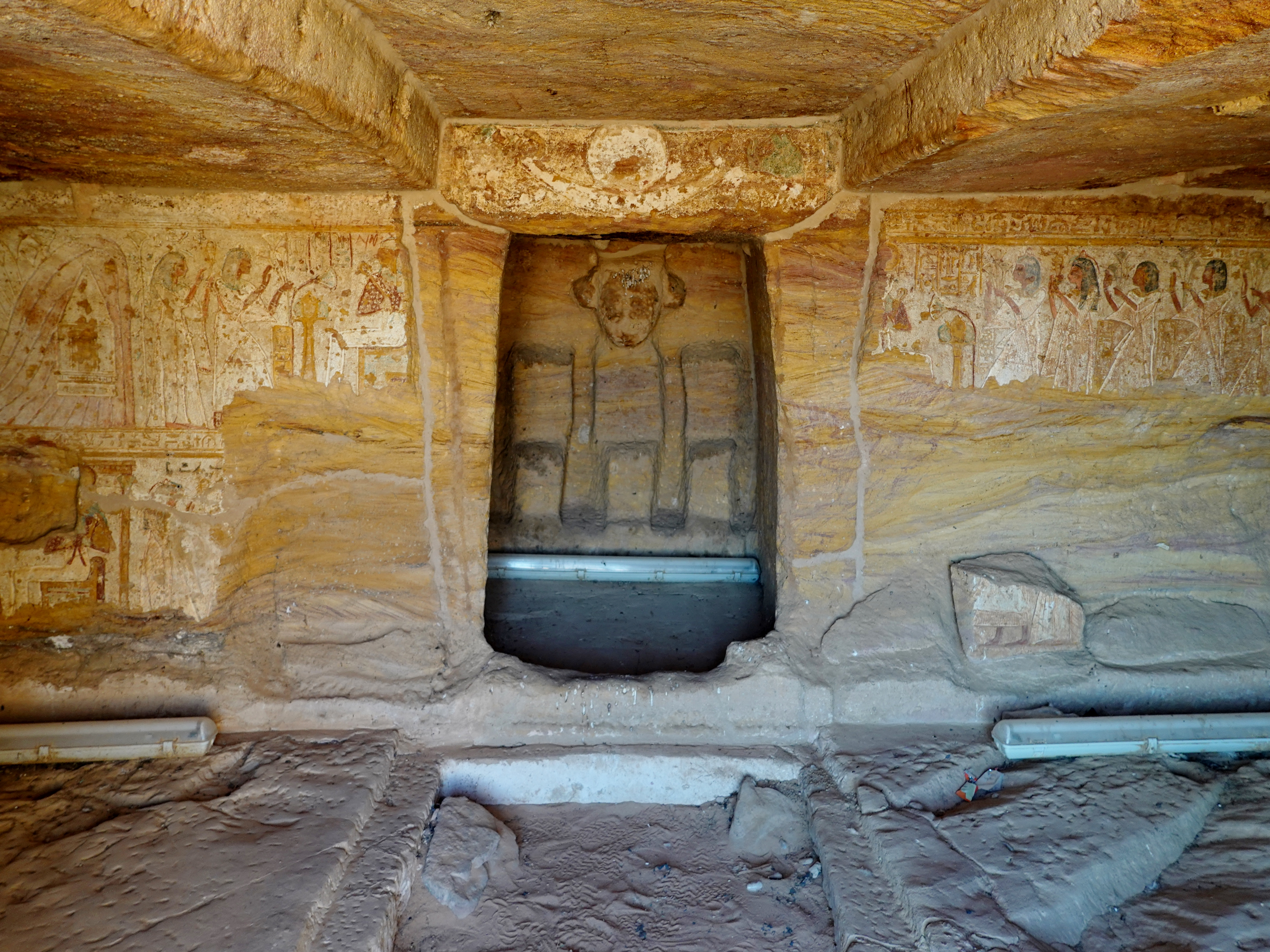
Tomb of Pennut, view from the entrance into the tomb

Aniba was a village in Nubia, about 230 km south of Aswan. The place is today flooded by Lake Nasser. In ancient times it was an important town called Miam. The region around the town was one of the most fertile in Lower Nubia.

The earliest remains at Aniba date to around 3000 BC and belong to the A-Group culture. Several cemeteries belonging to them have been found. In the Middle Kingdom (about 2000 to 1700 BC) the region was ruled by Egyptians and in the Twelfth Dynasty a fortress with a small town was built. At the beginning of the New Kingdom (about 1550 BC) the town was extended to a size of about 200 x 400 m with a wall and gates. During the New Kingdom the town grew and had several suburbs. Within the town proper stood the temple for Horus of Miam. When excavated it was badly preserved but its foundation may be dated to the Middle Kingdom. North of the town stood a Nubian village belonging to the C-Group Culture.

Around the town were huge cemeteries, some of them belonging to Nubians, but other tombs were erected in purely Egyptian style. It is not known for certain whether the people buried here were Nubians that adopted Egyptian culture or native Egyptians. One rather simple tomb belonged to the Viceroy of Kush Pinehesy, an important person also known from other sources.

The ceramics from the site were recently analysed again, and many tombs originally thought to be of New Kingdom dating were identified as being from the Second Intermediate Period, thus changing the understanding of the site chronology.

C-Group, Second Intermediate Period and New Kingdom metalwork from Aniba was recently analysed and found out to be made of arsenical copper and tin bronze, and sourced likely as far as Cyprus.

A decorated rock cut tomb belonging to the deputy of Lower Nubia Pennut was relocated to New Amada as part of the International Campaign to Save the Monuments of Nubia. The latter office most likely had its headquarters in Aniba.
