= New Wadi es-Sebua =

Archaeological site in Egypt

Coordinates: 22°48′2″N 32°32′51″E

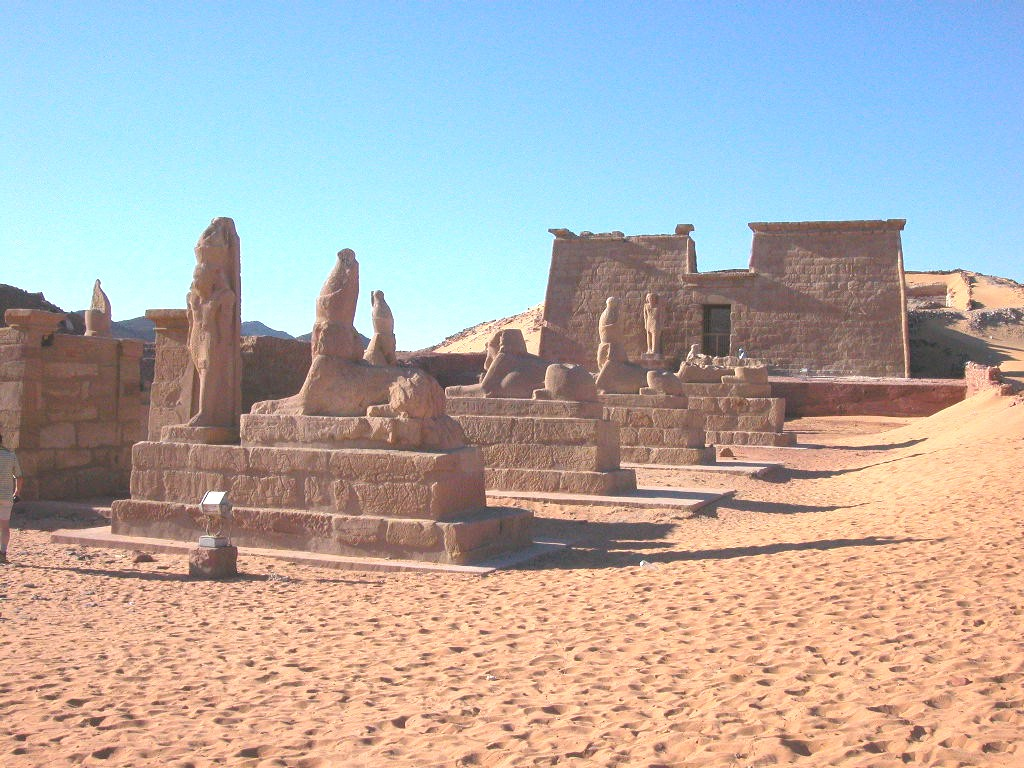
Ramesses' temple at Wadi es-Sabua

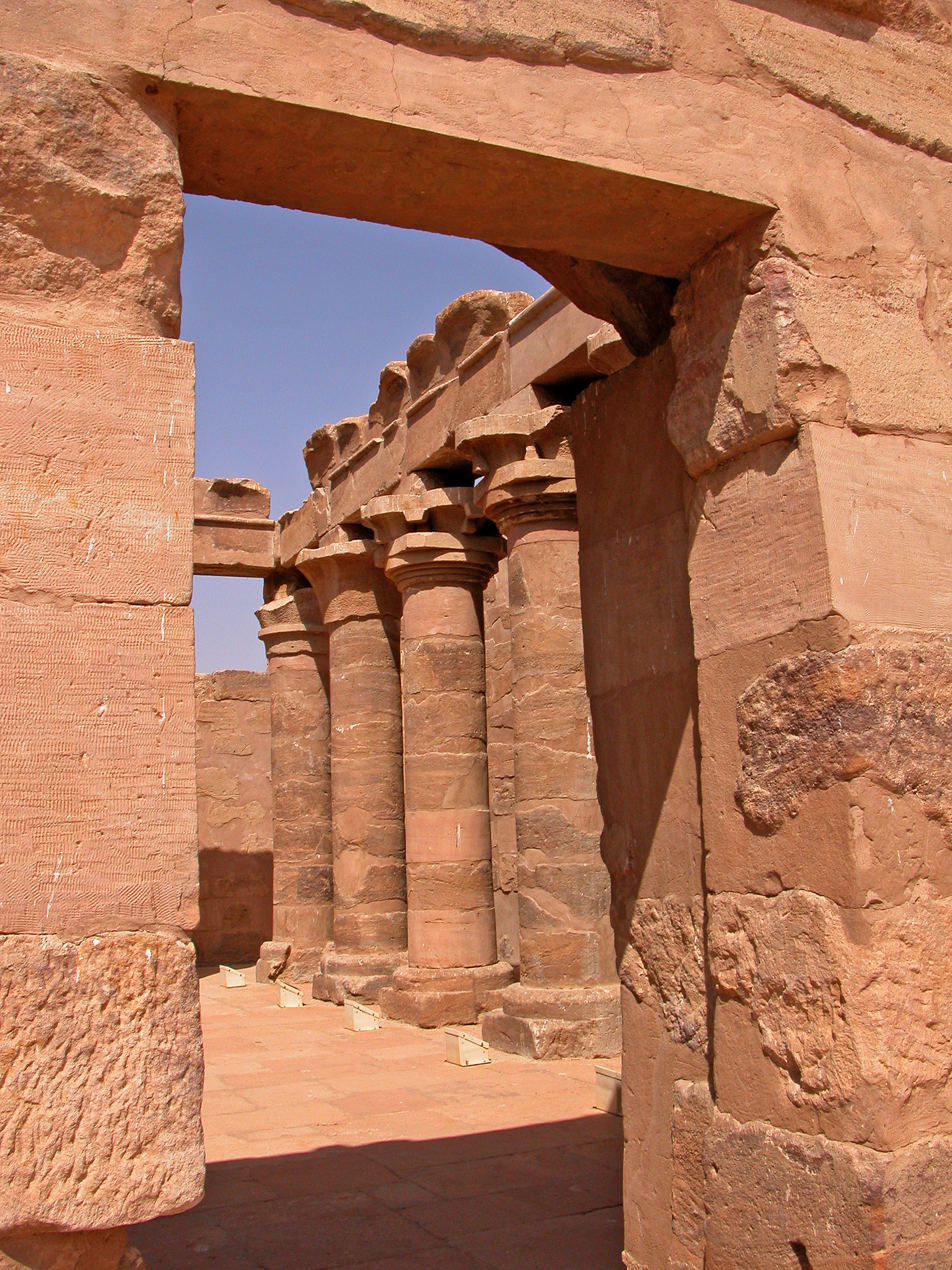
Temple of Maharraqa

The New Wadi es-Sabua is an archaeological site in Egypt.

Created during the International Campaign to Save the Monuments of Nubia, it is located only 4 km west from the original site of Wadi es-Sebua, which today contains three ancient Egyptian temples in Lower Nubia, the temples of Wadi-es Sebua, Maharraqa and Dakka respectively.

== Wadi es-Sabua Temple ==
The Temples of Wadi es-Sebua were erected by the two New Kingdom Egyptian pharaohs, Ramesses II and Amenhotep III. Both temples feature pylons and an inner rock-cut sanctuary. The structures were subsequently moved to a new location in the 1960s due to the construction of the Aswan Dam.

== Temple of Maharraqa ==
The temple of Maharraqa was an ancient Egyptian temple from the Roman period that was never completed.

== Temple of Dakka ==
The Greco-Roman Temple of Dakka, dedicated to Thoth, is today located at the New Wadi es-Sebua area.

== Bibliogrophy ==
- Gauthier, Henri (1912). Les Temples immergés de la Nubie: Le Temple de Ouadi Es-Seboua. 2 volumes. Cairo: Institut français d'archéologie orientale.
- Emery, Walter B., and L. P. Kirwan (1935). The Excavations and Survey between Wadi Es-Sebua and Adindan, 1929–1931. 2 volumes. Cairo: Government Press.
- Daumas, François (1960). "Rapport sommaire sur les fouilles exécutées à Ouadi Es-Sebouâ en mars 1960". Bulletin de l'Institut français d'archéologie orientale, 60, pp. 185–187.
- Daumas, François (1967). "Ce que l'on peut entrevoir de l'histoire de Wadi es-Sebouâ en Nubie". Cahiers d'Histoire Égyptienne, 10, pp. 23–49.
- Žába, Zbyněk (1967). "The Third Czechoslovak Expedition to Nubia in the Frame of the Safeguarding of the Nubian Monuments Project: Preliminary Report". In Fouilles en Nubie (1961–1963), pp. 217–224.
- Gohary, Jocelyn (1998). Guide to the Nubian Monuments on Lake Nasser. Cairo: American University in Cairo Press.
- Ullmann, Martina (2023). "The Temple of Amenhotep III at Wadi es-Sebua". In Proceedings of the 12th International Congress of Egyptologists, pp. 503–509. Cairo.
- van Loon, Gertrud J. M., and Dobrochna Zielińska (2022). "Le temple de Ouadi es-Seboua: Les implantations chrétiennes". In Études coptes XVII, pp. 97–121. Paris: de Boccard.
