= Kiosk of Qertassi =

Egyptian temple

Coordinates: 23°57′37″N 32°52′03″E

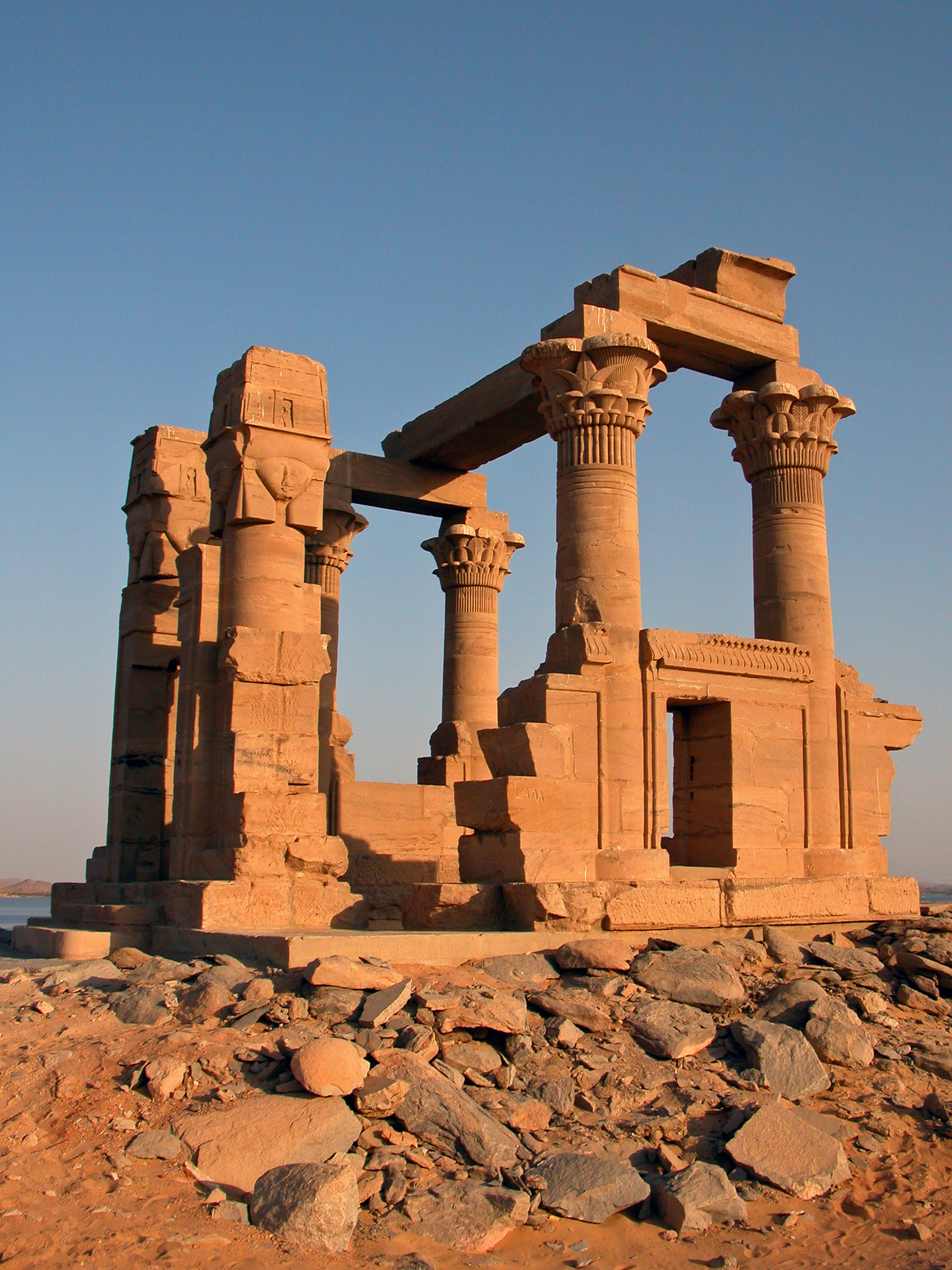
Kiosk of Qertassi, 2004

The Kiosk of Qertassi is "a tiny Roman kiosk with four slender papyrus columns inside, [and] two Hathor columns at the entrance." It is a small but elegant structure that "is unfinished and not inscribed with the name of the architect, but is probably contemporary with Trajan's Kiosk at Philae."

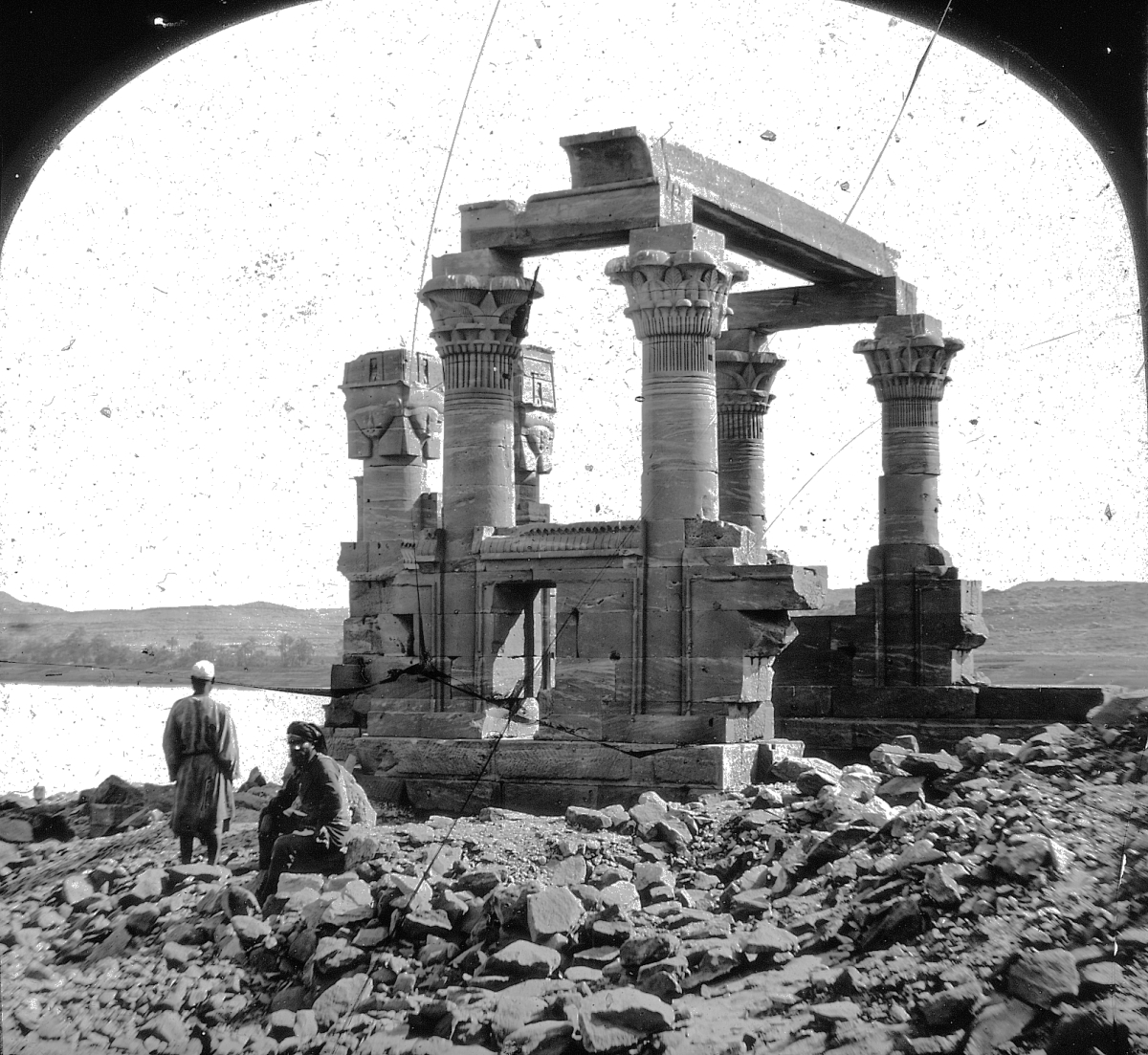
Egypt - Ketussi, Nubia. Brooklyn Museum Archives, Goodyear Archival Collection

According to Günther Roeder – the first scholar to publish research on this building – the kiosk of Qertassi dates to the Augustan or early Roman period. The structure "is only twenty-five feet square, and consists of a single Hathor court oriented north or south, and originally surrounded by fourteen columns connected by screen walls." Of the 14 pillars, only 6 have survived in place. The pillars or columns were made of brown sandstone; the structure itself was "perhaps connected to a small temple on the East Bank [of the Nile] which was still in existence in 1813."

This kiosk has now been moved to the site of New Kalabsha in Southern Egypt as part of the International Campaign to Save the Monuments of Nubia, but "once stood to the entrance to the sandstone quarries" of Qertassi. Its capitals "are decorated with Hathor heads, in honour of the goddess who was [the] patron of quarry-men and miners. Since Hathor was often associated with Isis, as she is at Philae, it has been suggested that "this kiosk and the small temples of Dabod and Dendur were way stations on the processional route taken by priests bearing the image of Isis around Lower Nubia, which was held to be her estate." Due to the paucity of timber in the arid region of Nubia, the kiosk's roof was constructed with sandstone slabs that were supported by architraves on its long sides.
