= Temple of Aksha =

Rebuilt ancient Egyptian temple in Khartoum, Sudan

Aksha, Sudan
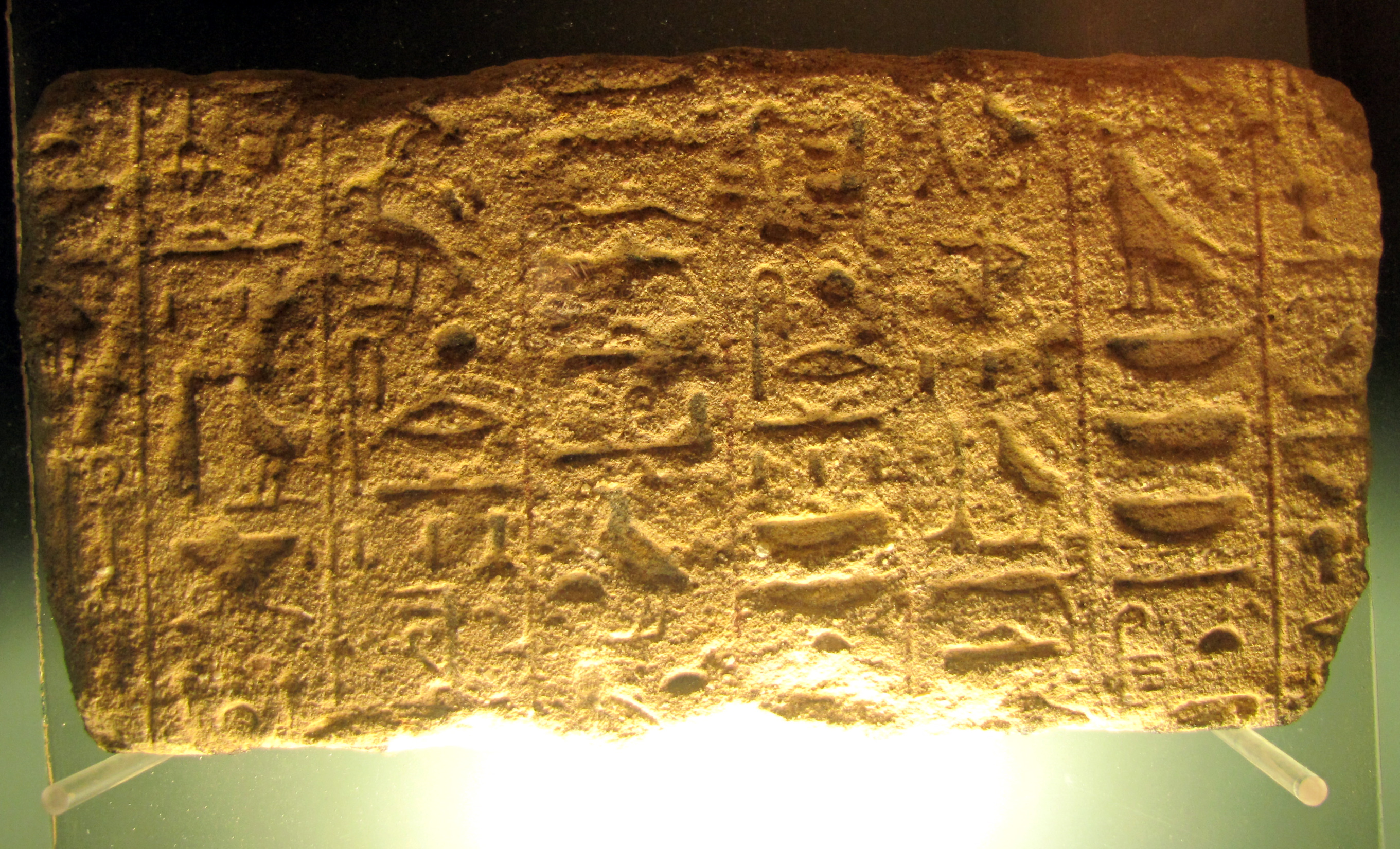
- An inscription on the north wall of the Aksha temple entrance corridor that relates the opening of a water well in the eastern desert road leading to the gold mines of Alaki Vadi.

- Location within Sudan
- 21°05′00″N 30°43′00″E
- Type: Settlement
- Location: Northern, Sudan
- Region: Middle Kingdom

History
- Built: c. 1250 BCE

Aksha is an ancient Egyptian temple, rebuilt in part at the National Museum of Sudan in Khartoum as part of the International Campaign to Save the Monuments of Nubia. The temple was built around 1250 BC by Ramses II. It is situated in the far north of present-day Sudan, a few kilometers south of Faras, on the west side of the Nile. On the temple walls, several sacrifices are depicted. The location of the temple was not well chosen, as it is only a few inches above the high tide of the Nile. This resulted in penetration of the lower wall layers, salt crystallization on the wall surfaces, and stones being worn down over the centuries. In addition, the temple was preyed upon by the local population. Other finds at the site include cemeteries, parts of Qubanstele, and the stele with the "blessings of Ptah".

The 1963 excavations of Aksha were initiated because of the construction of the Aswan Dam. One of the discoveries included a relatively well-preserved temple wall, the western wall of the courtyard. Along its entire length, it contains a carved list of the foreign nations which Ramses II. After the temple was deemed worthy of preservation, archaeologists from the University of Ghana sawed the wall into individual blocks. It was rebuilt in the garden of the National Museum, protected by a pavilion.
