= UNESCO Courier =

Magazine

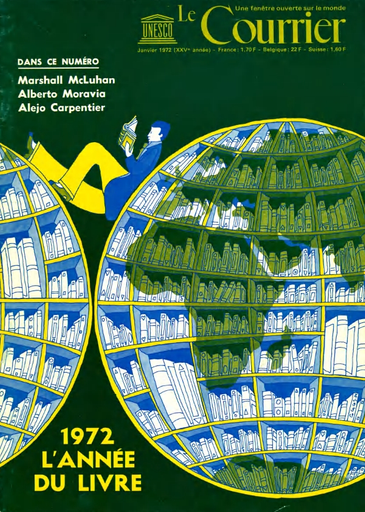
- 1972 edition of the International Book Year
- Editor: Agnès Bardon
- Format: Broadsheet
- Publisher: UNESCO
- Founded: 1948
- Based in: Paris
- Language: Spanish, English, French, Arabic, Tamil, Chinese, Russian, Portuguese, Esperanto, Sicilian
- Website: UNESCO Portal'–in English
- ISSN: 2220-2269

UNESCO Courier is the main magazine published by the United Nations Educational, Scientific and Cultural Organization (UNESCO). It has the largest and widest-ranging readership of all the journals published by the United Nations and its specialized institutions.

== History and profile ==
UNESCO Courier was started in 1948 by Sandy Koffler (1916–2020). There was a gap in publication from 2013 until 2017. The magazine has changed a great deal over the years, both in content and in form. But it pursues its original mission: promote UNESCO's ideals, maintain a platform for the dialogue between cultures and provide a forum for international debate.

The printed UNESCO Courier covers issues of literacy, human rights, environment, culture, science and arts.

Available online for free as a PDF since March 2006, The UNESCO Courier serves readers around the world: Most issues are available in English, French, and Spanish. Since 2010, versions in Arabic, Chinese, Portuguese, and Russian have been published, and additional languages, including Esperanto, Sardinian, Sicilian, Korean, and Catalan, have been introduced since 2017. A limited number of printed issues are also produced.

The texts of current issues are available in Open Access under the Attribution-ShareAlike 3.0 IGO (CC-BY-SA 3.0 IGO) license. In 2023 a machine-readable digital corpus of Courier's articles was published on Zenodo, making the archive of Courier's English-language edition usable for text mining.

== Editors-in-chief ==
Current Director is Matthieu Guével and Editor-in-Chief is Agnès Bardon.

Previous directors:

- Jasmina Sopova: since April 2007
- Enzo Fazzino: 2006
- Vincent Defourny: 2005
- Michel Barton: 2002–2004
- J. Burnet: 2000–2001
- John Kohut: 1999–2000
- Sophie Bessis: 1998
- Bahgat El Nadi et Adel Rifaat: 1988–1998
- Édouard Glissant: 1982–1988
- Jean Gaudin: 1979–1982
- René Calloz: 1977–1978
- Sandy Koffler: 1951–1977
- Peter du Berg: 1950
- Sandy Koffler: 1948–1950
