= New Amada =

Archaeological site in Egypt

Coordinates: 22.73115°N 32.26261°E

Locations of Old and New Amada

New Amada is a promontory located near Aswan in Egypt.

Created during the International Campaign to Save the Monuments of Nubia, it houses three important temples, structures, and other remains that have been relocated here from others sites in Lower Nubia, to avoid the rising waters of Lake Nasser caused by the construction of the Aswan High Dam. The major remains are described below:

== Amada Temple ==
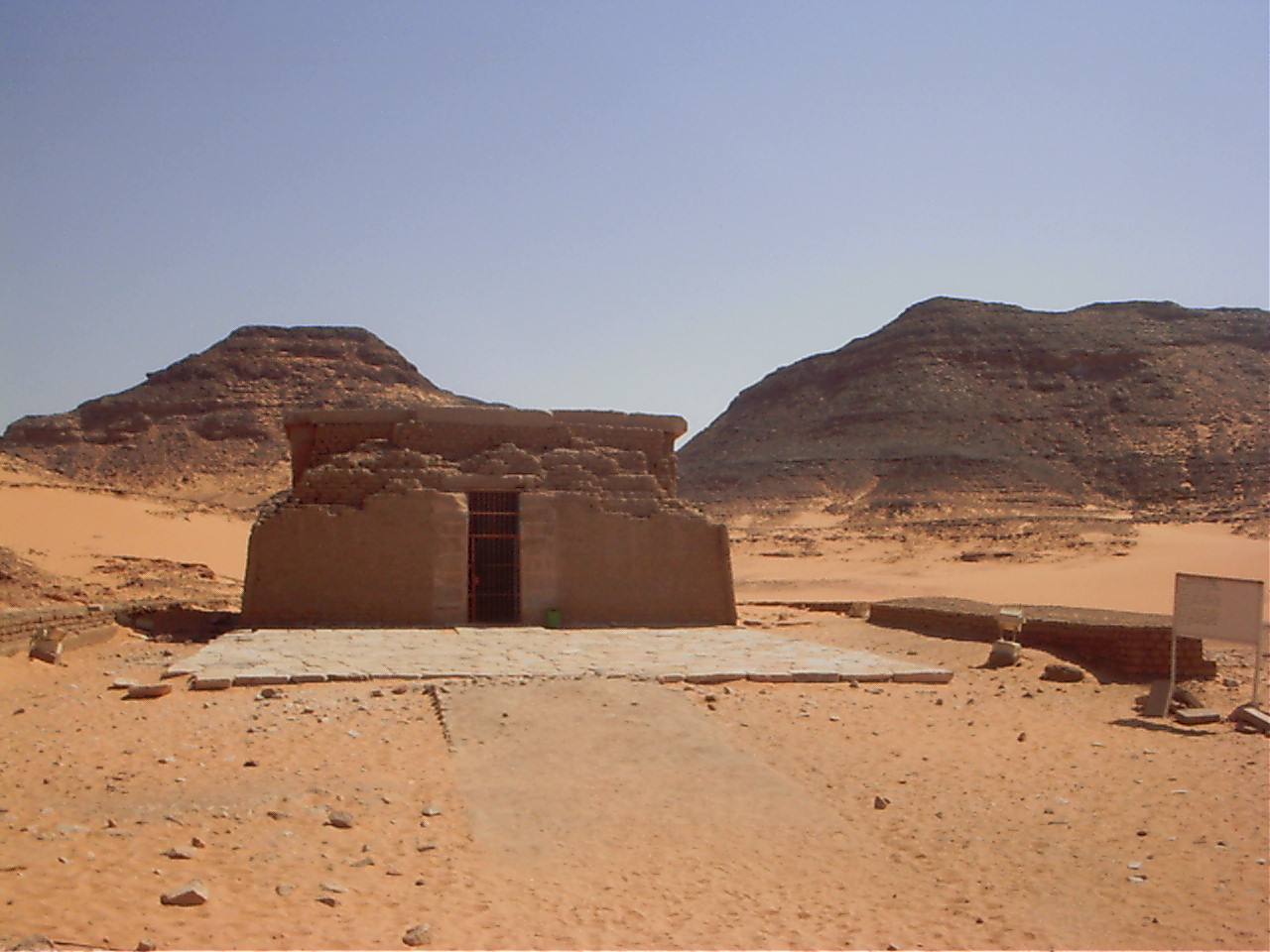
The facade of Amada temple

The Temple of Amada, the oldest Egyptian temple in Nubia, was first constructed by Pharaoh Thutmose III of the 18th dynasty and dedicated to Amun and Re-Horakhty. His son and successor, Amenhotep II continued the decoration program for this structure. Amenhotep II's successor, Thutmose IV decided to place a roof over its forecourt and transform it into a pillared or hypostyle hall. During the Amarna period, Akhenaten had the name Amun destroyed throughout the temple but this was later restored by Seti I of Egypt's 19th Dynasty. Various 19th Dynasty kings especially Seti I and Ramesses II also "carried out minor restorations and added to the temple's decoration." The stelas of the Viceroys of Kush Setau, Heqanakht and Messuy and that of Chancellor Bay describe their building activities under Ramesses II, Merneptah and Siptah respectively. In the medieval period the temple was converted into a church.

== Temple of Derr ==
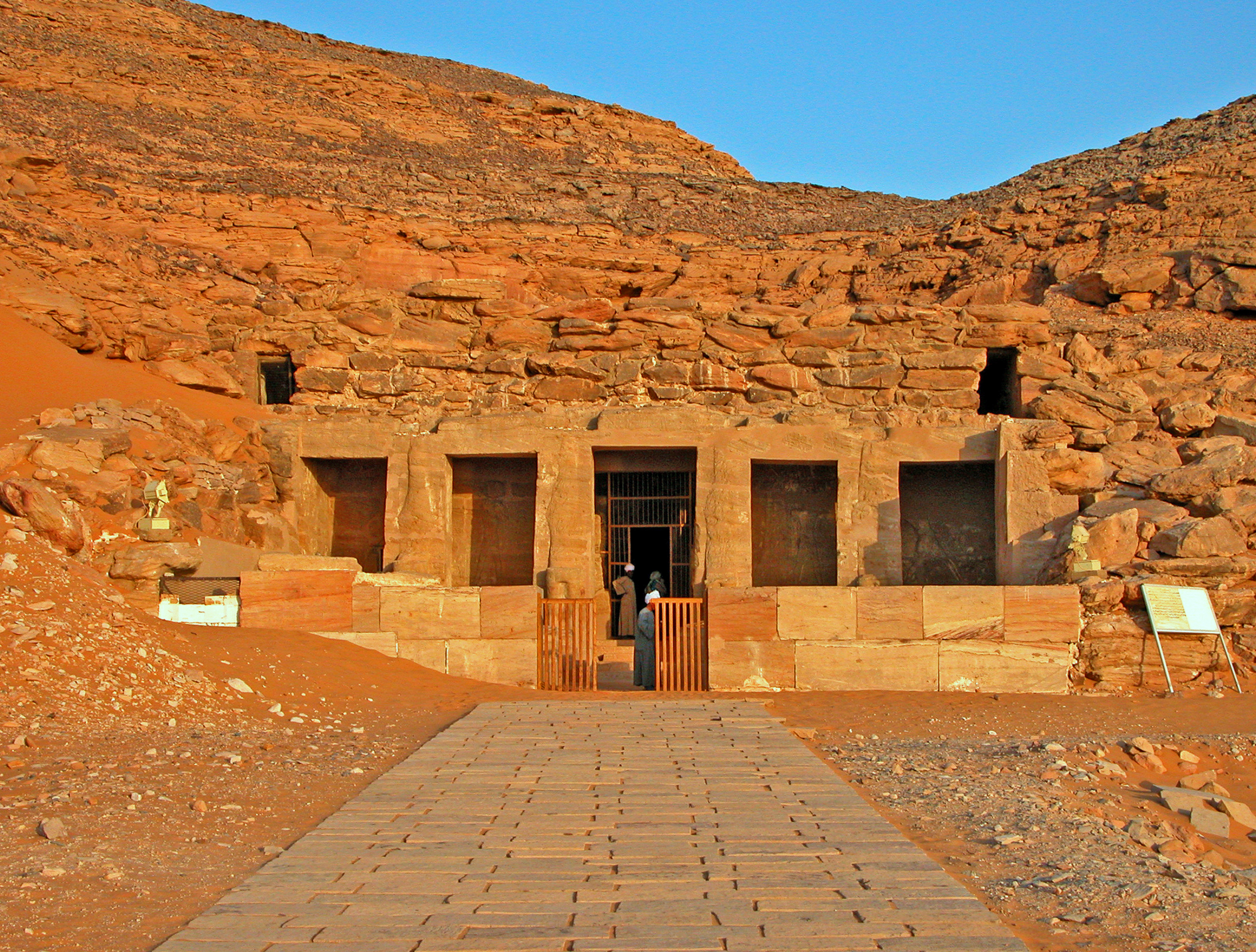
Facade of the reassembled Temple of Derr

The Temple of Derr or el-Derr is a speos or rock-cut Egyptian temple, originally in Lower Nubia. It was built during the 19th Dynasty by Pharaoh Ramesses II. It is the only rock-cut temple in Nubia, which was constructed by this pharaoh on the right (or east) bank of the Nile and used to stand at el-Derr. The temple's unique position "was probably because the river on its approach to the Korosko bend flows in an 'unnatural' southeasterly direction." The Derr structure was known in ancient times as 'The Temple of Ri'amsese-meryamun [Ramesses II] in the Domain of Re ' and was dedicated to the god Ra-Horakhty. Scholars disagree over its precise construction date: the French Egyptologist Nicolas Grimal states that it was built in the thirtieth year of Ramesses II, presumably to coincide with his first royal jubilee. John Baines and Jaromír Málek also write that the temple of Derr "was built in the second half of the king's reign", likely because its "plan and decoration resembles the Great Temple of Abu Simbel (minus the colossal seated statues against the facade)." Abu Simbel was built between Year 24 and Year 31 of Ramesses' reign. According to Joyce Tyldesley, the Temple of Derr was built by Setau, who is known to have served as Ramesses' Viceroy of Kush or Nubia between Year 38 to 63 of this pharaoh's reign.

== Tomb of Pennut at Aniba ==
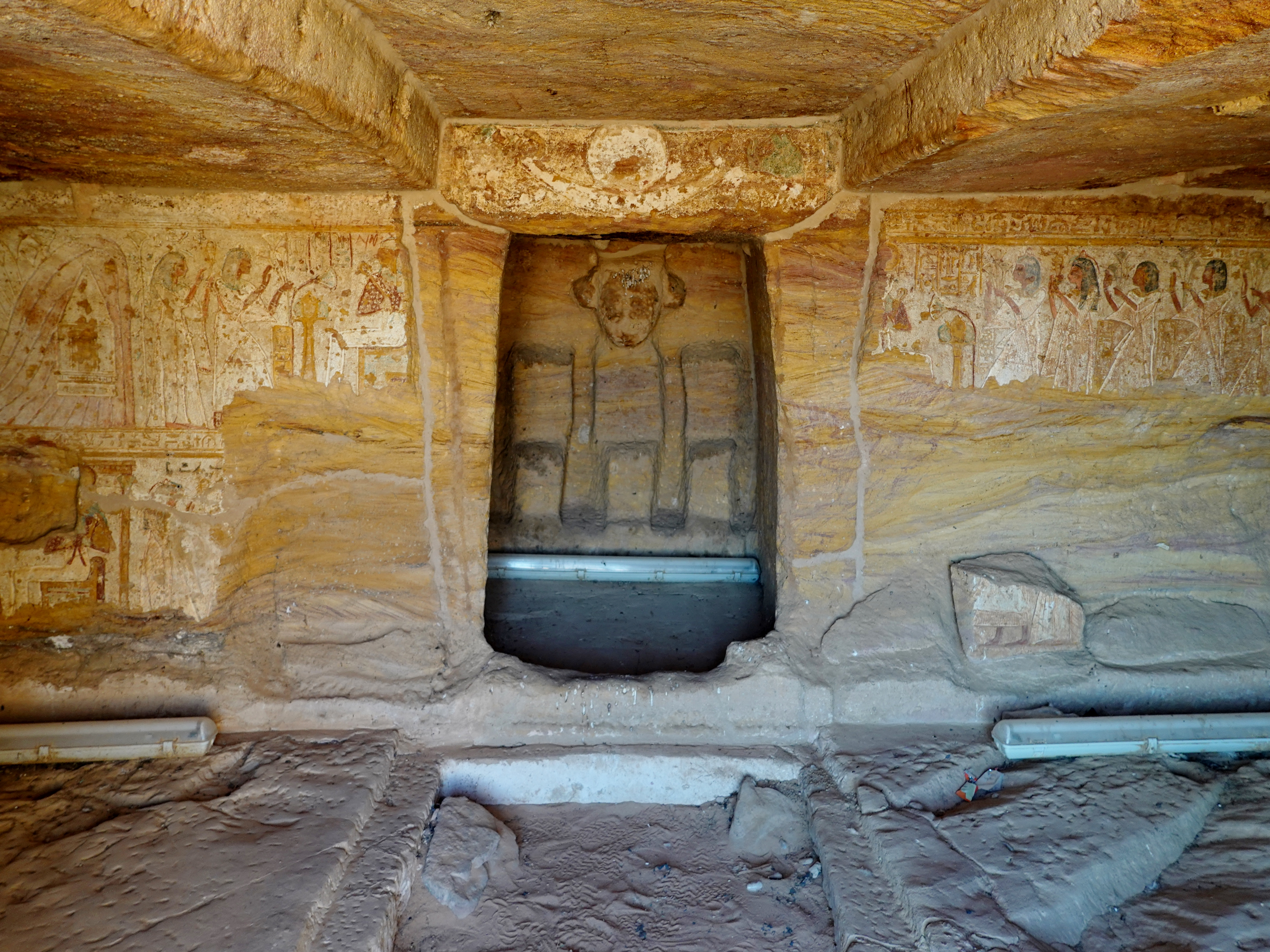
Tomb of Pennut, view from the entrance into the tomb

A decorated rock cut tomb belonging to the deputy of Lower Nubia Pennut was relocated as part of the International Campaign to Save the Monuments of Nubia. The latter office had most likely its headquarter in Aniba. Aniba was a village in Nubia, about 230 km south of Aswan. The place is today flooded by the Lake Nasser. In ancient times it was an important town and called Miam. The region around the town was one of the most fertile in Lower Nubia.

== Bibliogrophy ==
- Gauthier, Henri (1913). Les Temples immergés de la Nubie: Le temple d'Amada. Cairo: Institut français d'archéologie orientale.
- Blackman, Aylward M. (1913). The Temple of Derr. Cairo.
- Ullmann, Martina (2019). "Egyptian Temples in Nubia during the Middle and the New Kingdom". In Dietrich Raue (ed.), Handbook of Ancient Nubia, vol. 1, pp. 511–540. Berlin/Boston.
- Desroches-Noblecourt, Christiane (1975). "The rescue of the Temple of Amada". UNESCO Bulletin, 29(3), pp. 45–56.
- Edwards, I. E. S. (1980). The Relocation of Nubian Temples. London: British Museum Press.
- Arnold, Dieter, and Peter Grossmann (1981). "Amada, temple of Kalâbsha, Christian monuments, and rock-inscriptions". Actes du IIe Symposium International sur la Nubie, Supplément ASAE 24, pp. 89–94.
