= Nubian Museum =

Museum in Aswan, Egypt

Coordinates: 24°04′48″N 32°53′22″E

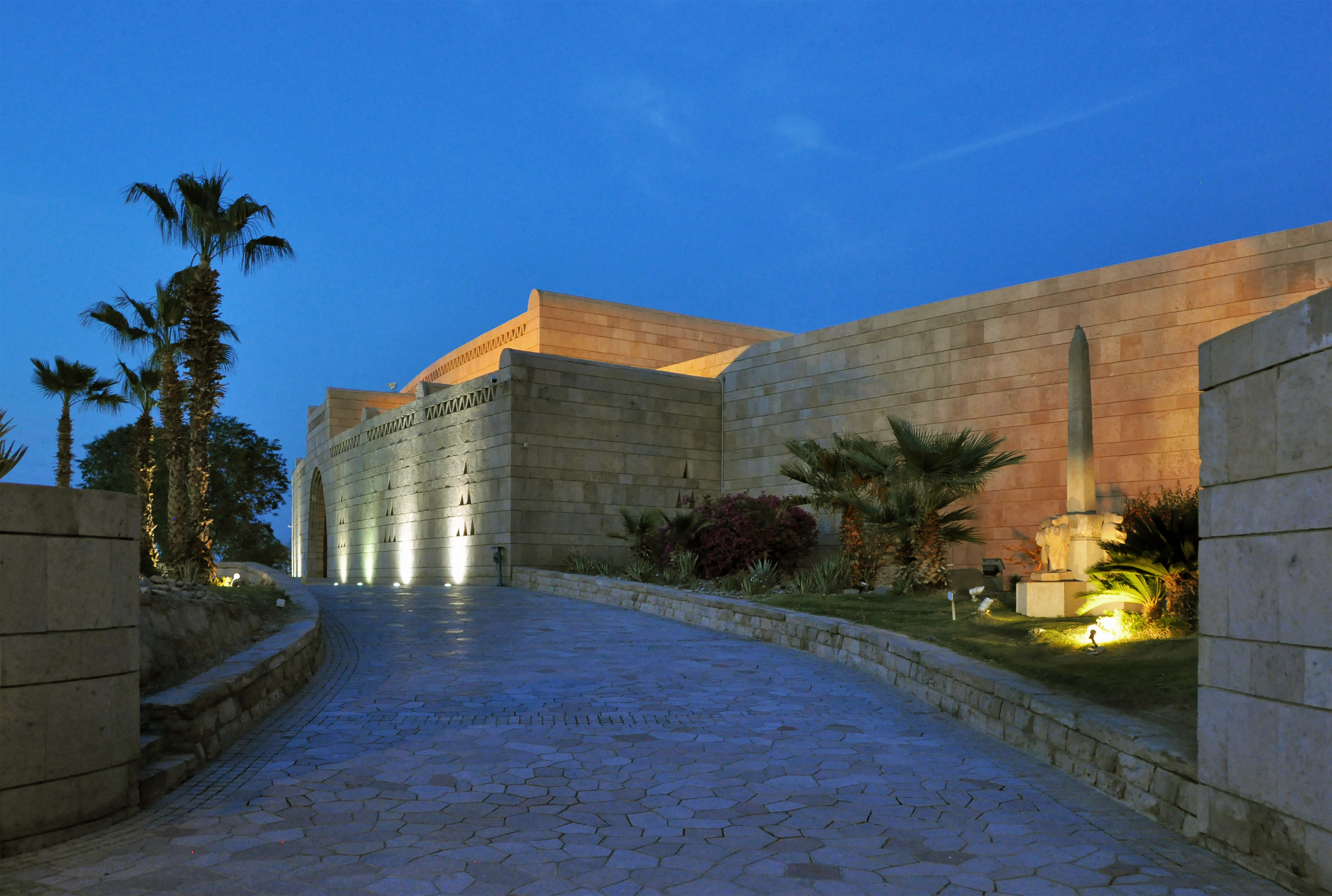
- Museum entrance
- Established: 23 November 1997
- Location: Aswan, Egypt
- Type: History Museum

The Nubian Museum (officially the International Museum of Nubia) is an archaeological museum in Aswan, Upper Egypt. It was built in 23 November 1997 following the UNESCO International Campaign to Save the Monuments of Nubia.

Dedicated to Nubian culture, heritage, and civilization, it was inaugurated on November 23, 1997, and was awarded the Aga Khan Award for Architecture in 2001. The museum was designed by Egyptian architect Mahmoud El-Hakim.

== Origin ==
The Nubian Museum was built after the Egyptian government requested its construction in 1960. Its development can be credited to specialists from UNESCO, and academics from universities throughout the nation. The request was a response to the International Campaign to Save the Monuments of Nubia, founded by UNESCO. Its creation allowed for a shared space to view and appreciate artifacts and monuments from Nubian history.

UNESCO's assistance in coordinating the logistical matters of funding and governmental affairs explains the museum's financing, development, and ultimate result. A trust fund, created in 1960, consisted of money from donor states and the governments of Sudan and Egypt. To this day, UNESCO and the executive board governing operations within the Nubian Museum continue to work towards the overarching goal of creating a space to appreciate the cultural heritage of ancient Nubia while preserving artifacts and practicing standard procedures of conservation on existing archeological sites throughout the region.

== Building ==
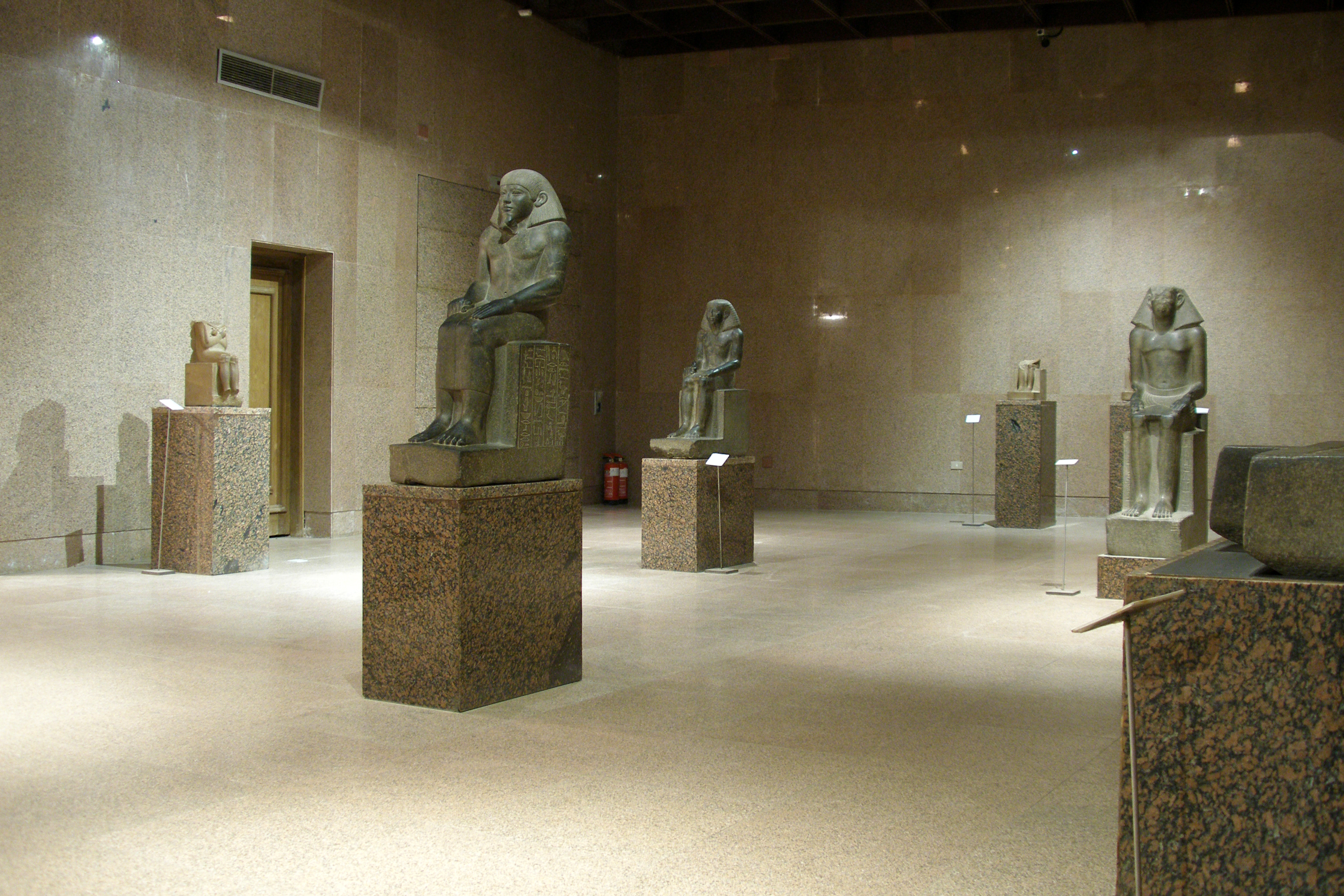
Pharaohs room.

The Nubian Museum covers an area of 50,000 square meters, 7,000 of which are devoted to the building, while the rest are devoted to gardens and other public spaces. The building has three floors for displaying and housing, in addition to a library and information center.

The museum was designed by the Egyptian architect Mahmoud El-Hakim for the Nubian Antiquities Salvage Fund and the Supreme Council of Antiquities, and was completed in 1997.[5] It is built of local stone on a rocky hill, and its plan and appearance draw on ancient temples, fortresses and the domestic architecture of the region.[5]

The largest part of the museum is occupied by the monumental pieces, reflecting phases of the development of Nubian culture and civilization.

== Contents ==
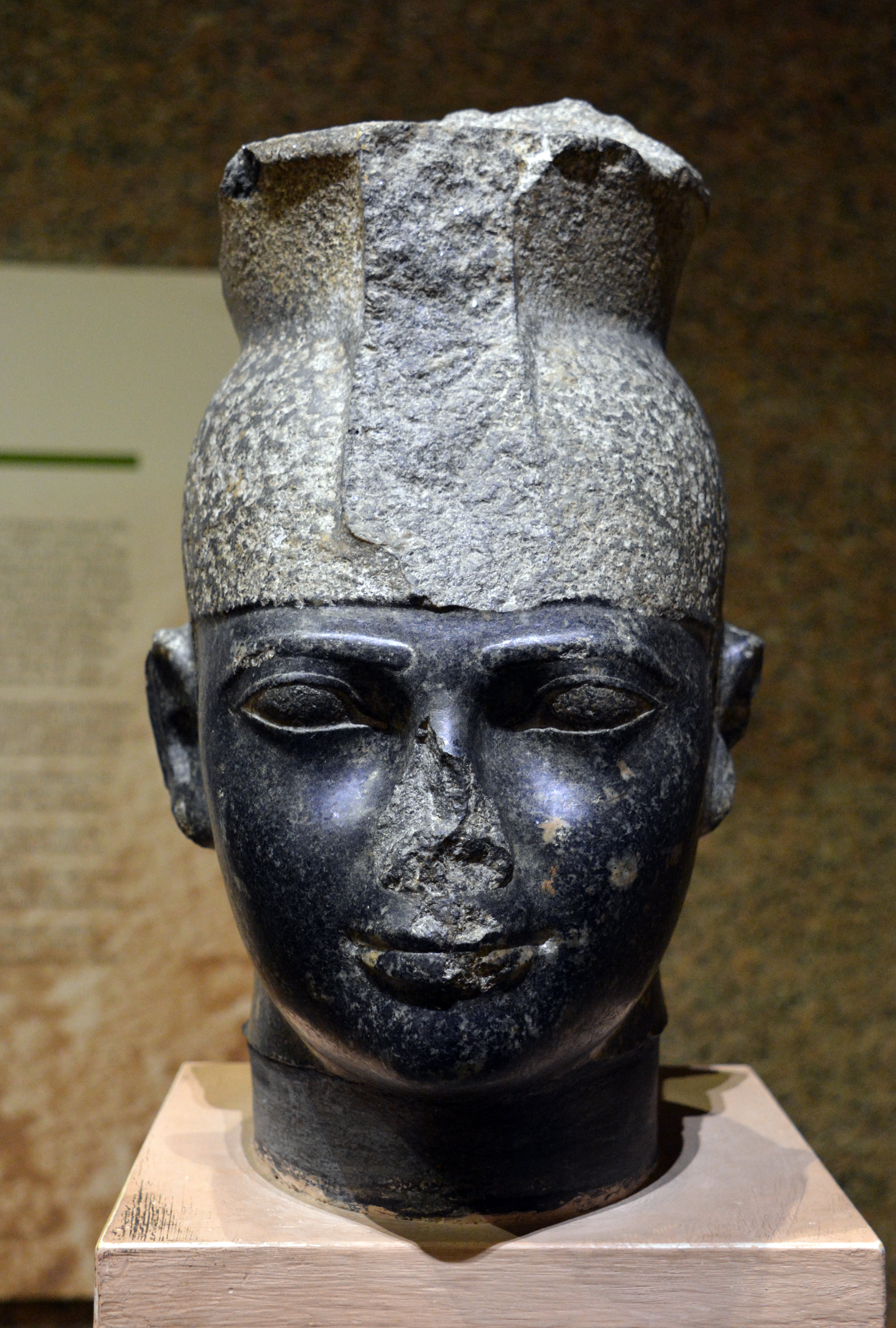
Portrait of Nubian King Taharqa, Nubian Museum.

Three thousand pieces of Egyptian antiquities, representing various ages; Geological, Pharaonic, Roman, Coptic and Islamic, were registered. The open-door exhibition includes 90 rare monumental pieces, while the internal halls contain 50 invaluable pieces dating back to pre-historic times, 503 pieces belong to the Pharaonic period, 52 to the Coptic era, 103 to the Islamic age, 140 to the Nubian era, in addition to 360 pieces reflecting the history of Aswan.

== Landscape ==
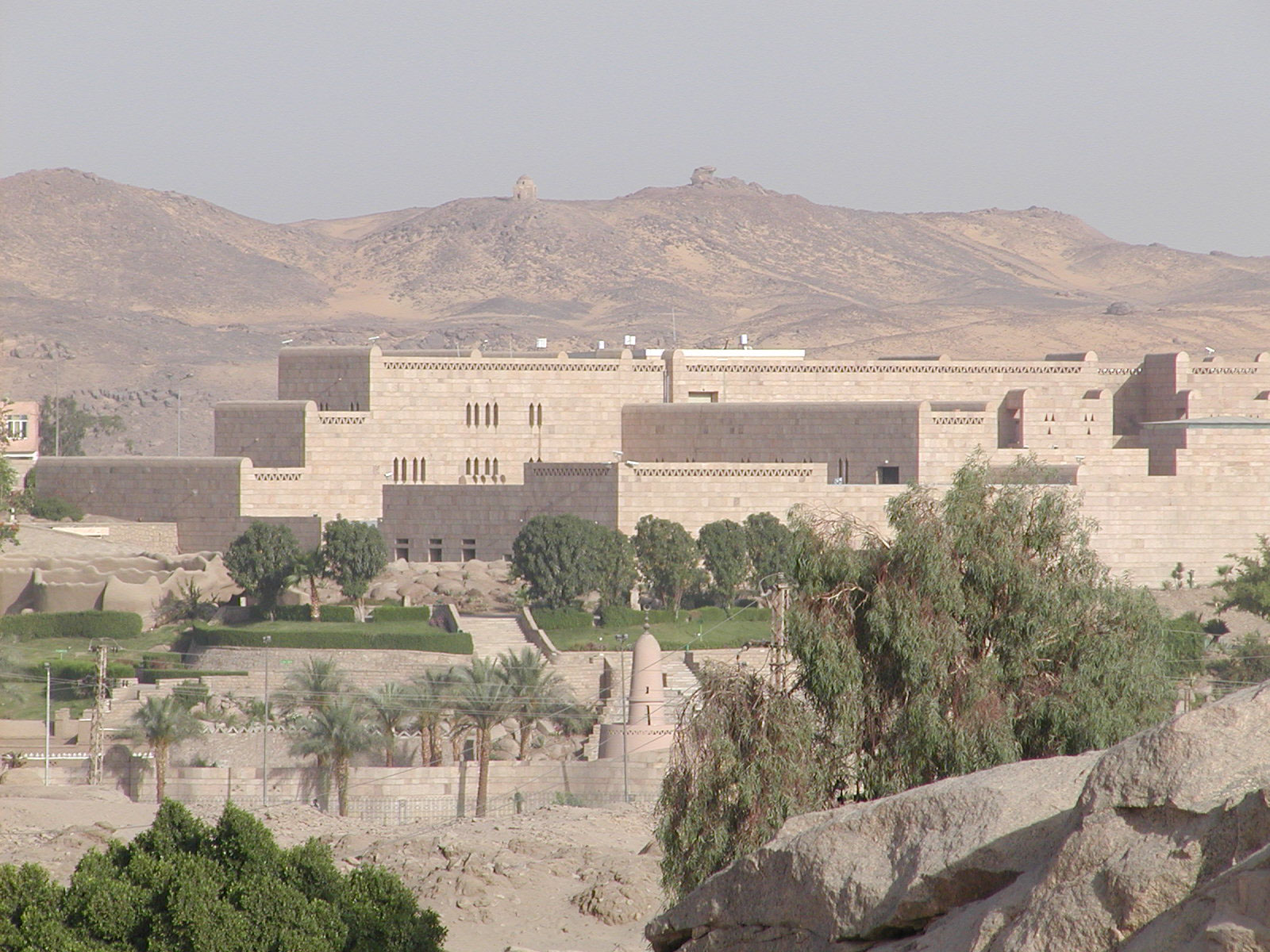
View of the museum

The Museum is built on a steep cliff, which enables it to embody a full scale design for the Nile river from its origins in Ethiopia and Sudan to Egypt. The edifice is surrounded by a Natural Botanical Garden, which contains a large variety of Egyptian flora.

== Administration ==
Since the museum opening, the administration has continued to upgrade their caretakers. The Head Director of Nubia Museum since opening has been Dr.Ossama A.W Abd El Maguid (known as "Ossama Hassoun"). He is an Egyptologist and a member of the International Council of Museums (ICOM) Saving Egyptian Culture Program.

== Community impact ==
The geographical scope of Ancient Nubia spanned across many modern-day nations and along the Nile River. The Nubian Museum depicts a shared history through archeological artifacts that connect a shared heritage continentally. The museum's creation permits individuals to appreciate and learn about the shared communal history that spans nations' borders.

The museum itself makes an effort to be involved within the local Aswan community. Locals are encouraged to visit during special hours to learn about Nubian history and research practices. Educational outreach brings in local students in an effort to encourage children to learn about research processes and ancient Nubian history. In addition to the educational side of museum outreach, there is a major push for community engagement through events. The museum space is used for community events and programs and results in a valuable relationship between the local community of Aswan and the museum.

== Major prizes ==
- Aga Khan Award for Architecture in 2001.

== See also ==
- List of museums in Egypt

== Bibliography ==
- 1982: Nubia Museum, Architectural and Exhibition Program, EAO-UNESCO, Unpublished report.
- 1997: Gaballa, Ali Gaballa, Nubia Museum, (Cairo: Ministry of Culture, The Higher Council of Antiquities, Museum Sector, Save Nubia Fund).
- 1998: Kaper, Olaf E. The New Nubia Museum of Aswan (http://www.assemblage.group.shef.ac.uk/4/4nubia.html.
- 2005: Abdel Wareth Abdel Meguid, O. “The Nubia Museum and Community”, Museum International, (Paris: UNESCO, May,), 225–226.
- 2000: Marino Giuseppe, De Simone, Costanza, Nubia Submerged: Through their Eyes with their Own Words. Cairo: Agenzia Italiana. (in cooperazione con Giuseppe Marino) (90 pp.).
- 2009: De Simone, Costanza, “The Documentation Center on Nubia at the Nubia Museum of Aswan”. Egyptian and Egyptological Documents, Archives (Università di Milano. Pontetremoli, Milano), 173–178.
- 2015: De Simone, Costanza, Nubia and Nubians: The ‘Museumization’ of a Culture. Saarbrücken, Germania: Lambert Academic Publishing (110, 305 pp.).
