= El Nabatat Island =

Island in the Nile River at Aswan, Egypt

Coordinates: 24°05′37″N 32°53′13″E

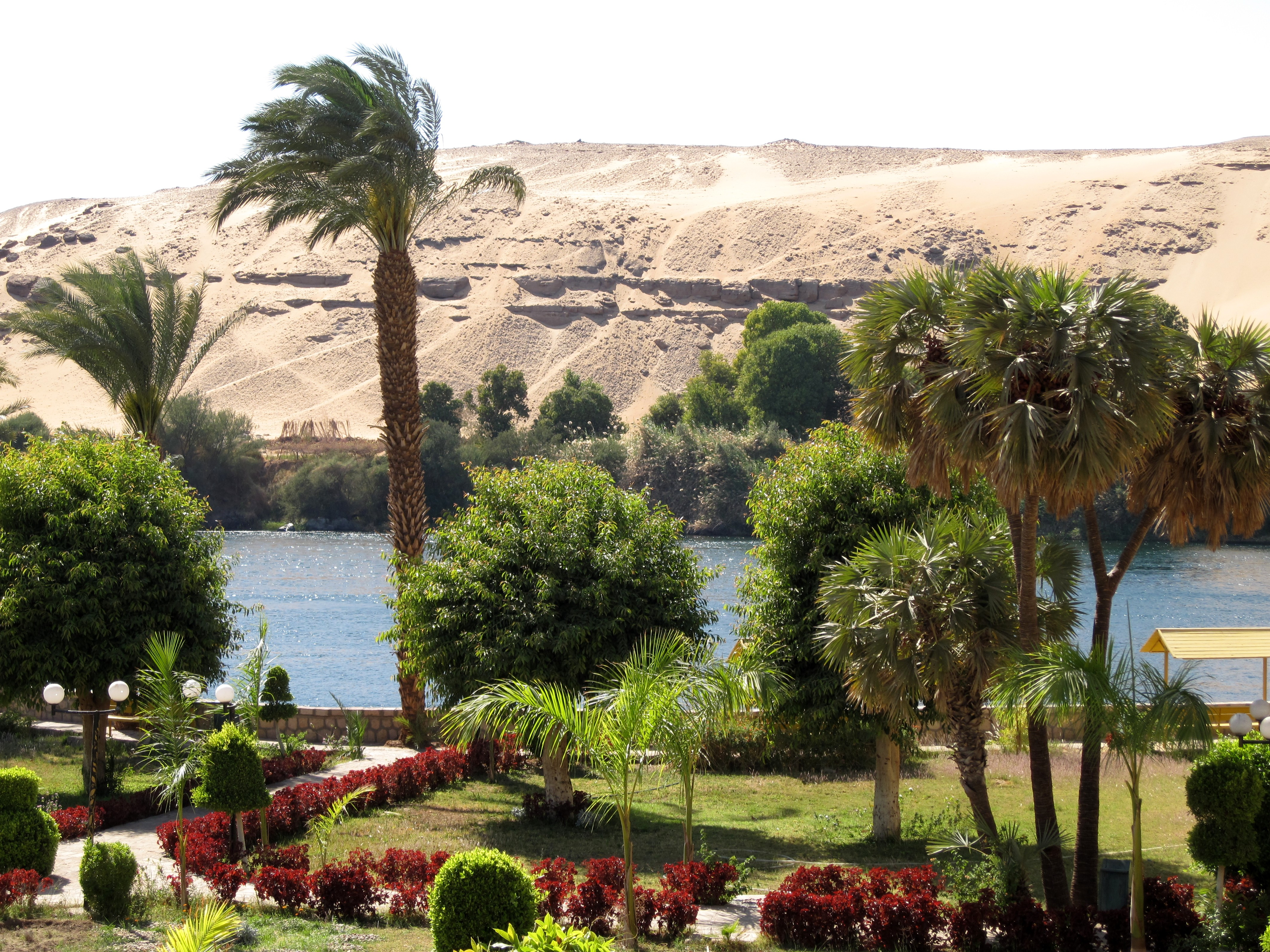
View on El Nabatat Island of the Aswan Botanical Garden and west bank of the Nile.

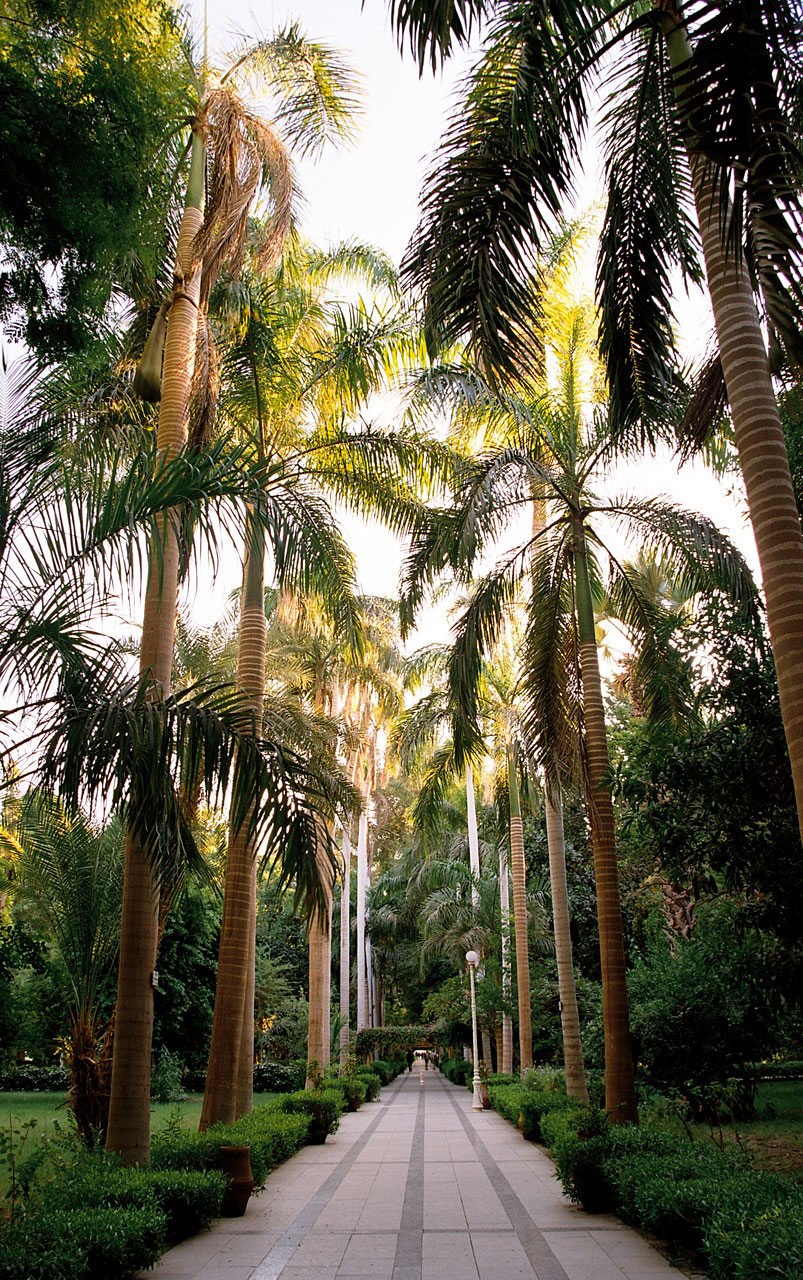
Palm tree allée (landscape avenue), in the Aswan Botanical Garden.

El Nabatat Island or Kitchener's Island (جزيرة النباتات Geziret En Nabatat (Plant Island) or the Botanical Island) is a small, oval-shaped island in the Nile at Aswan, Egypt. It is less than a kilometer long and its width is less than ½ a kilometer. The Aswan Botanical Garden is located on the island.

== Geography ==
El Nabatat Island is one of two major islands on the Nile in the vicinity of Aswan, the other one being Elephantine. Elephantine is the larger one, and is located between El Nabatat Island and the city of Aswan (east bank). Therefore, it can be hard to see the smaller El Nabatat Island from Aswan: "Aswan disappears behind Elephantine Island".

== History ==
The island was previously known as Kitchener's Island, named after Lord Kitchener who owned it. He was gifted the island when he served as Consul-General in Egypt from 29 September 1911 to June 1914.

With the aid of the Ministry of Irrigation, Kitchener rapidly transformed the small 750 metres (2,460 ft) long island into a paradise of exotic trees, many from India, and plants in gardens with view walkways. It later passed into the property of the Egyptian government and was used as a research station called the Botanical Research Institute, Aswân Botanic Island.

== Aswan Botanical Garden ==
The island, as a whole, constitutes the Aswan Botanical Garden. One can view the many types of subtropical, exotic, and rare plantings and trees such as the royal palm tree and the sabal palm tree. The collection was begun by Lord Kitchener and has been cared for since. The gardens are popular among the local people and tourists as a place to go for a quiet afternoon away from the noise of the city, and for weekend picnics. The island and gardens can be reached by felucca that reach the southeastern side of the small island.

== Gallery ==
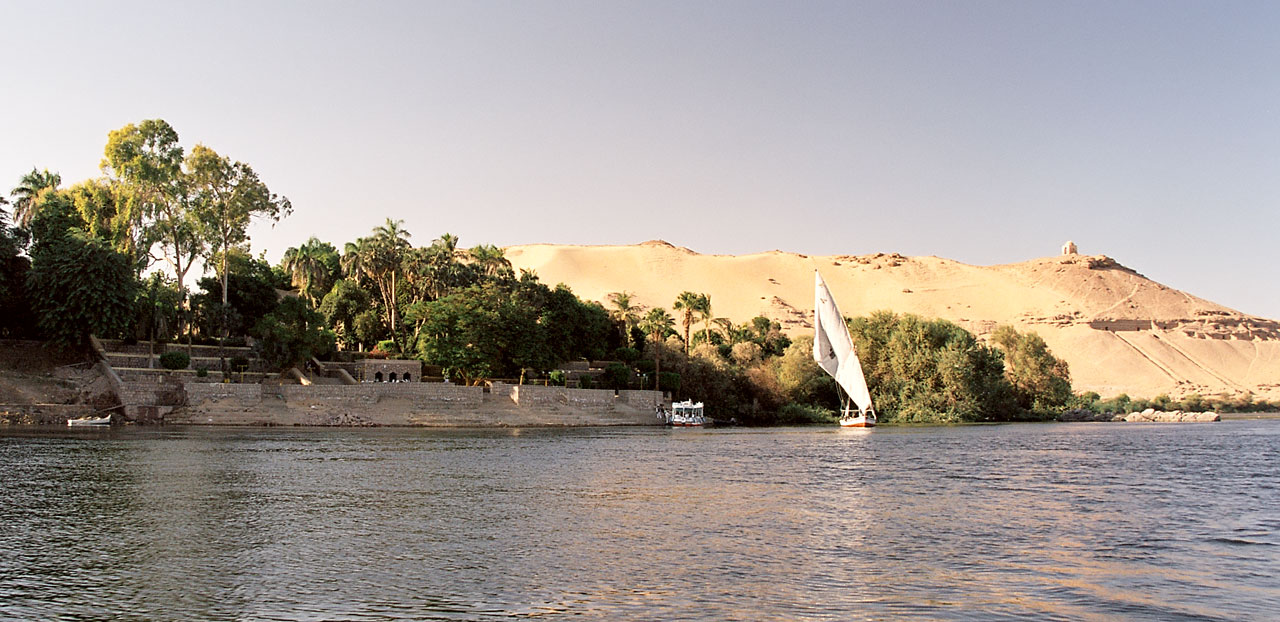
A view to the inbound felucca wharf on El Nabatat Island

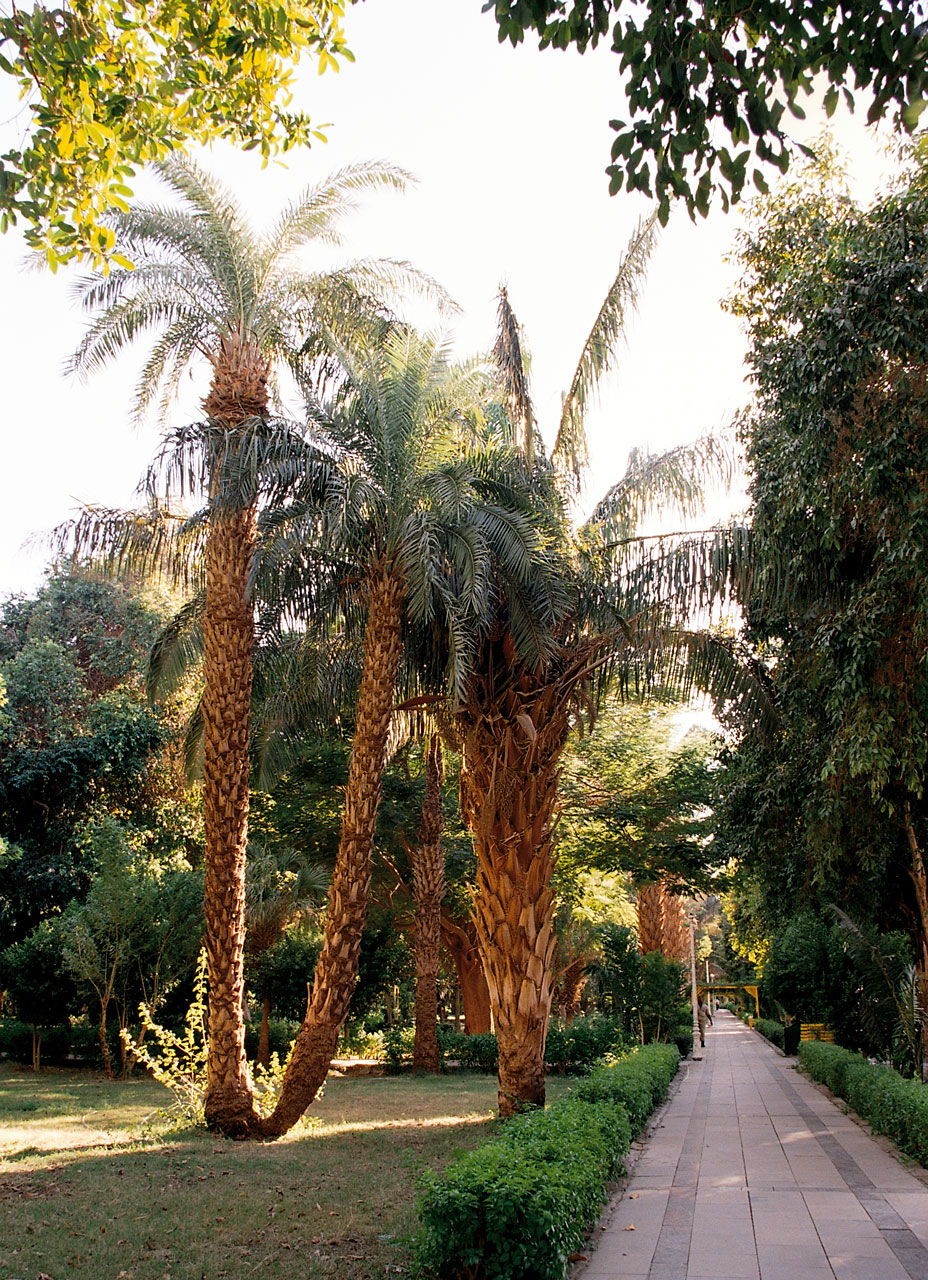
Palm trees at Aswan Botanical Garden

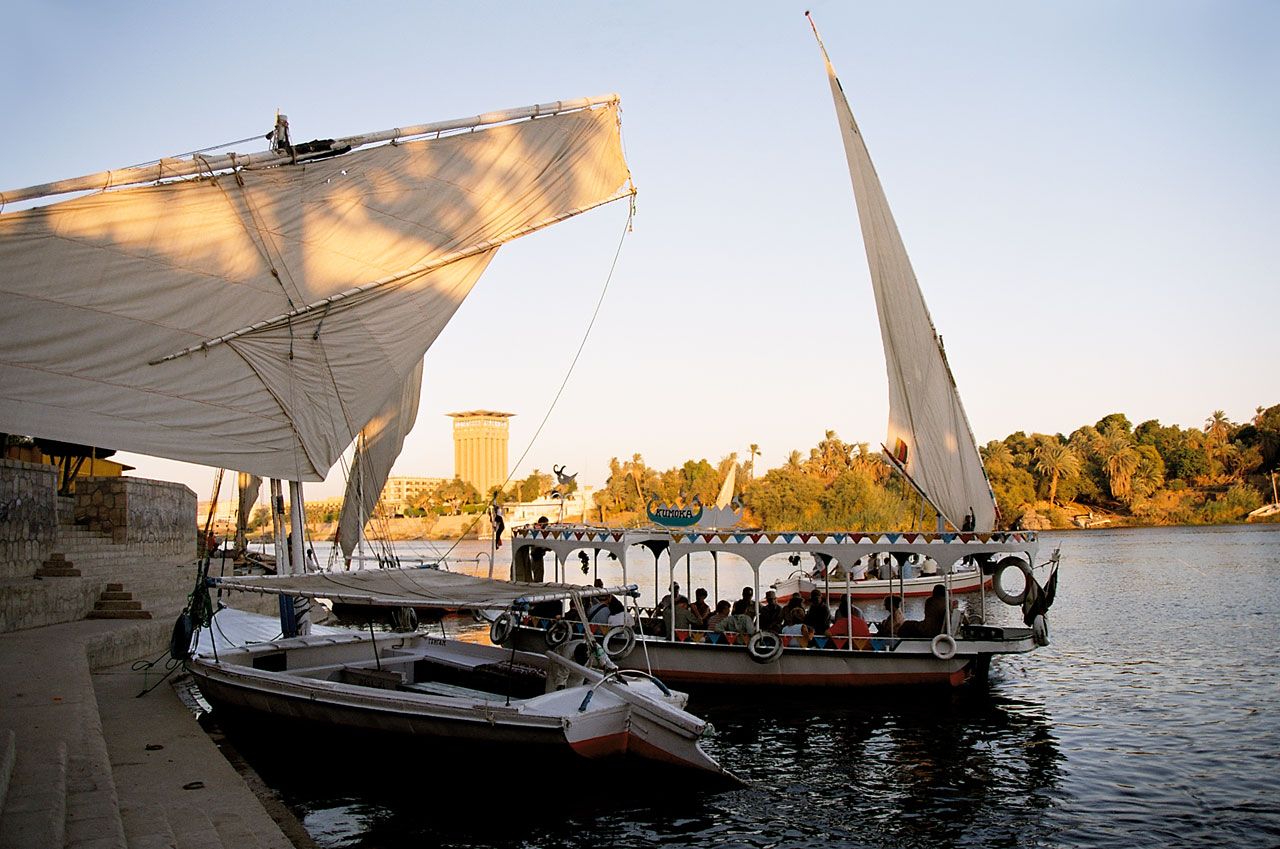
An outbound felucca wharf on El Nabatat Island

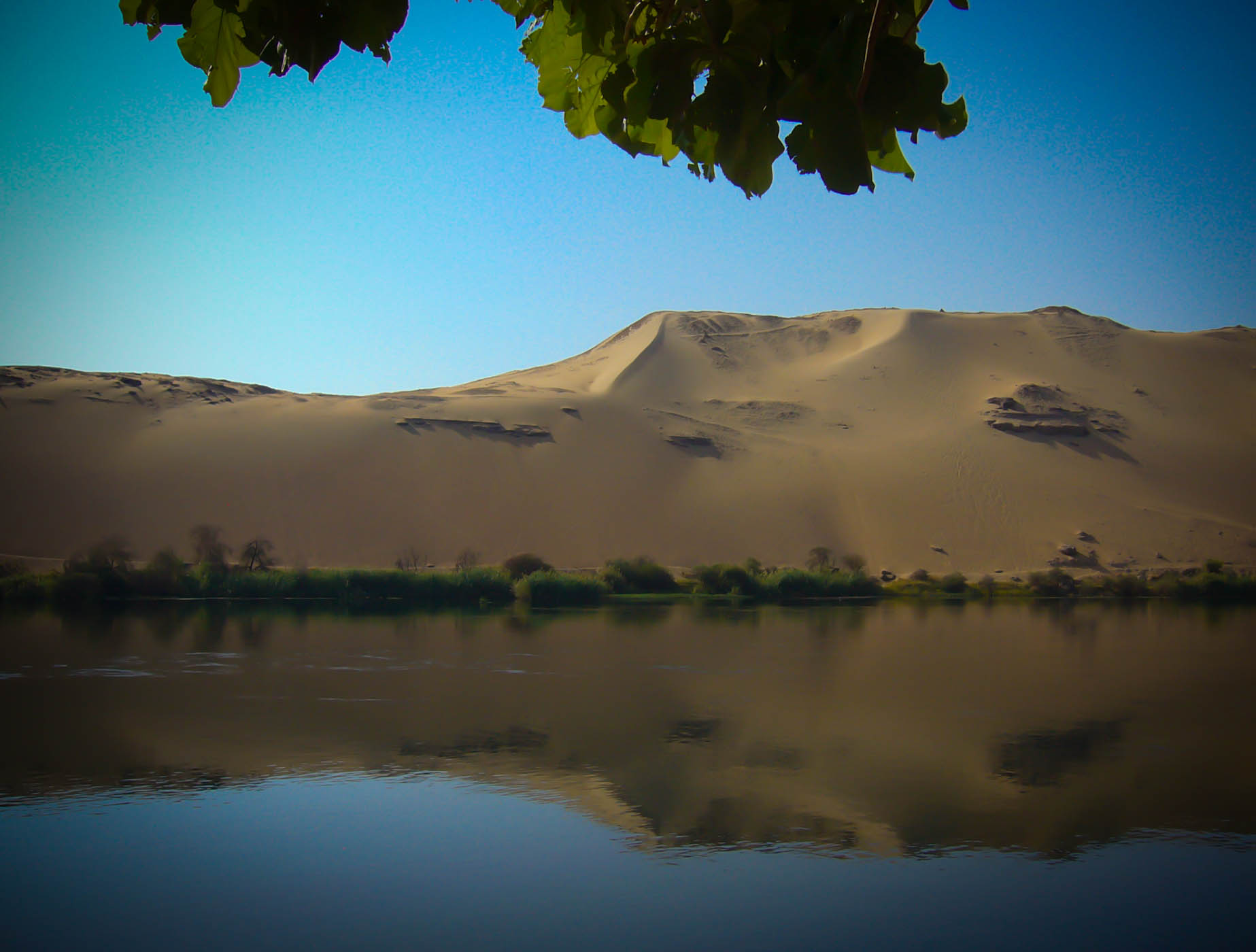
A view to the Nile's west bank from El Nabatat Island
