= Khalil Kalfat =

- Born: November 26, 1942; Aswan
- Died: November 9, 2015 (aged 72)
- Occupations: Intellectual; Translator; Writer

Khalil Kalfat (Arabic: خليل كلفت) (November 26, 1942 – November 9, 2015) was an Egyptian author, political thinker and translator. He was born in Nubia, Aswan in Egypt.
