= Aswan =

City in Egypt

Aswan أسوان Swenett
- City
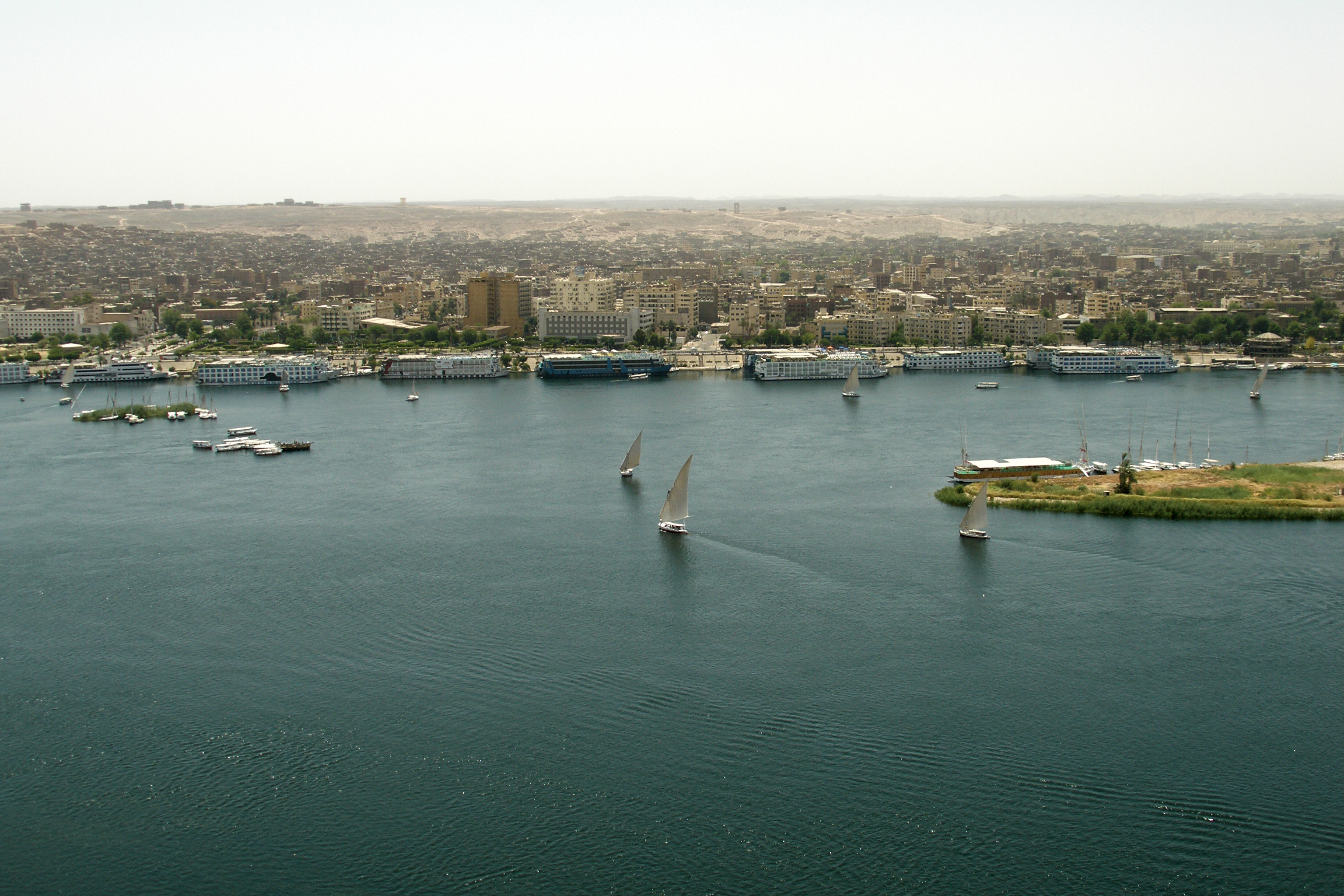
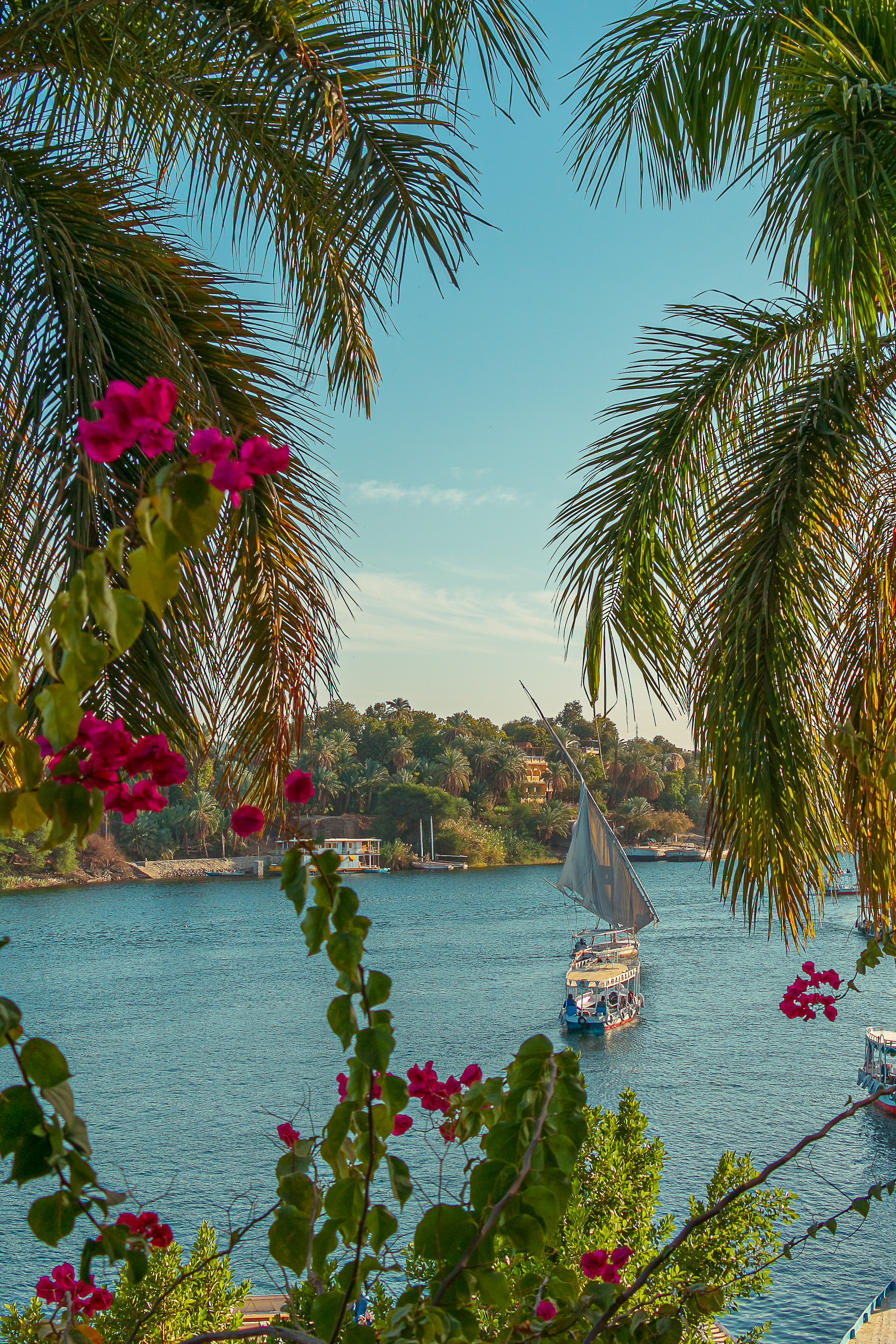
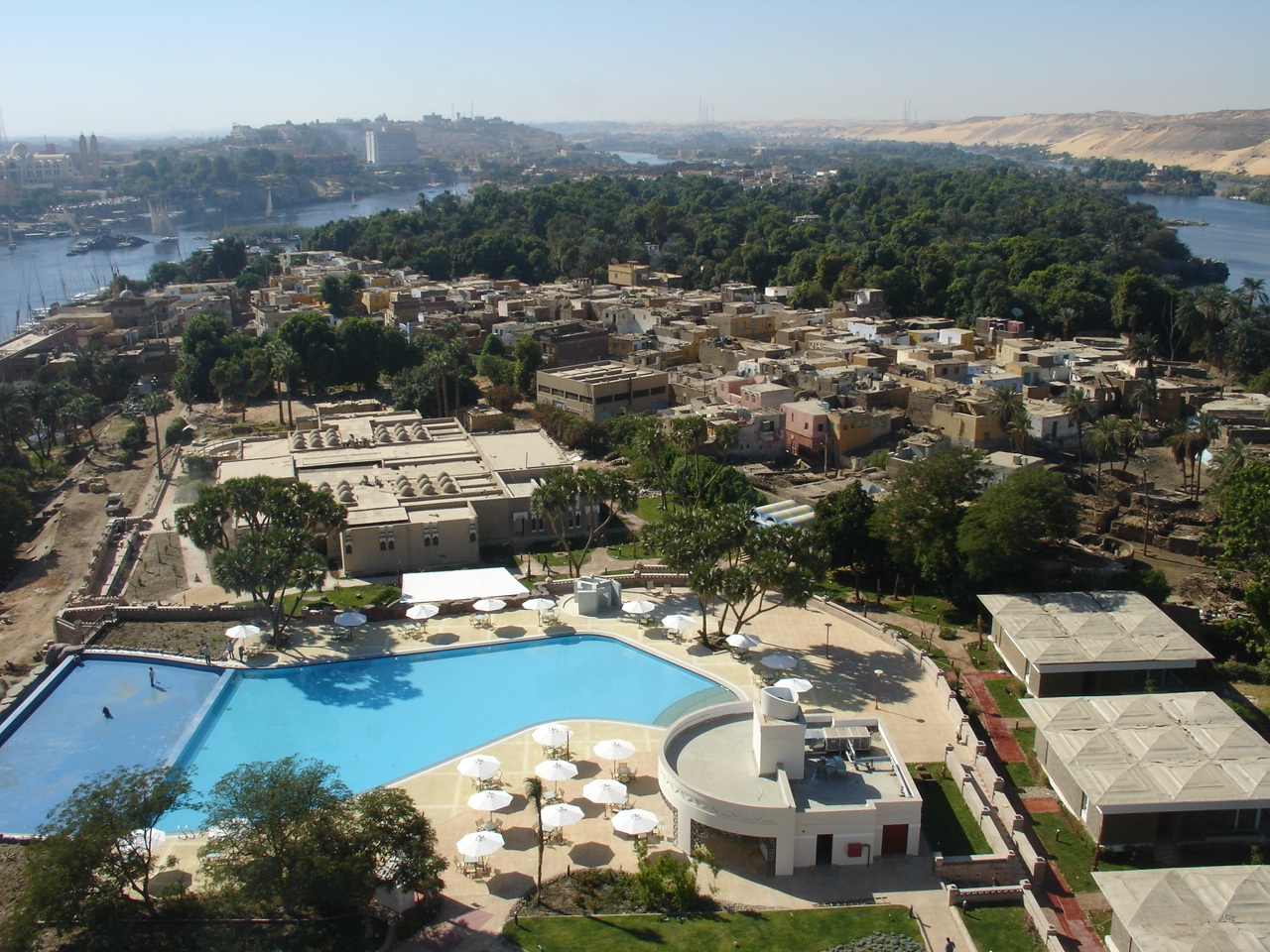
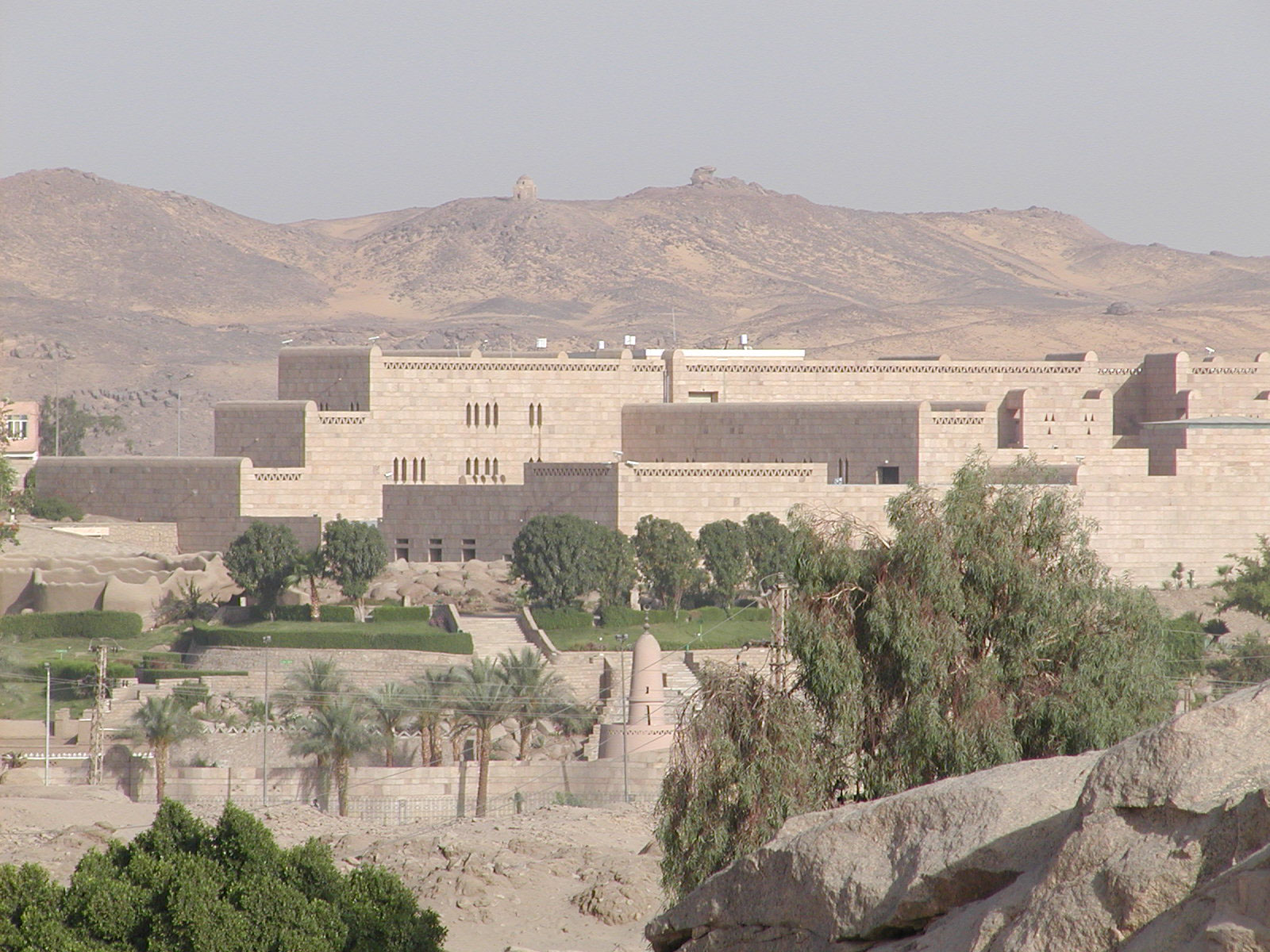
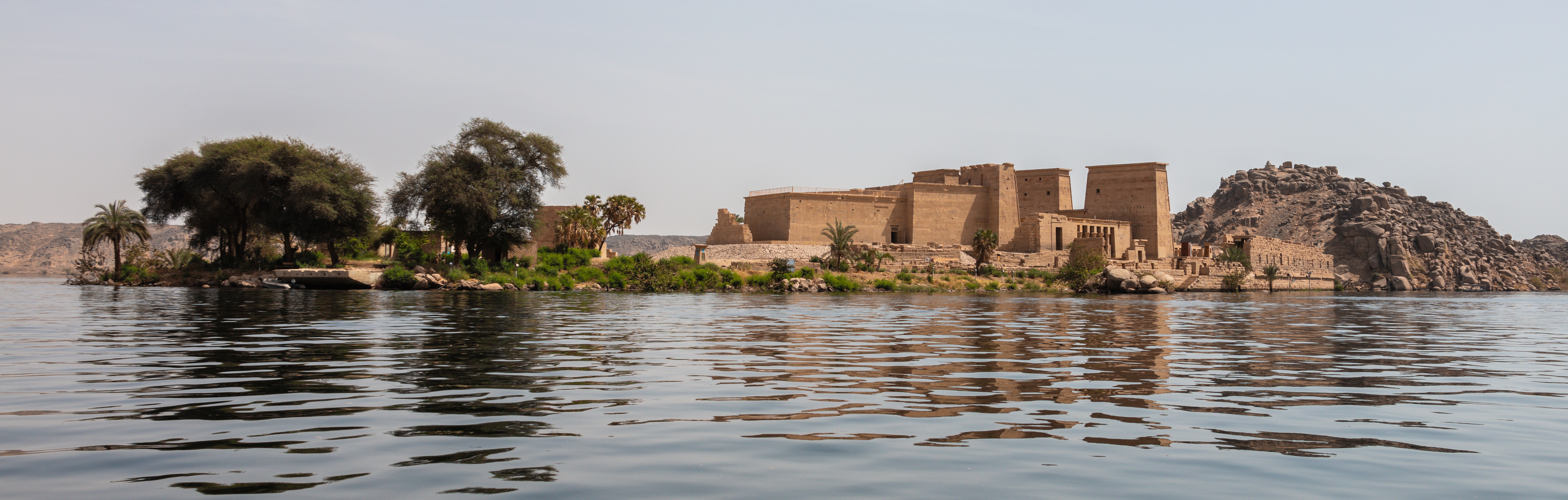
- View of the city from the Nile El Nabatat Island Aswan High Dam Aswan Bridge Elephantine Island Nubian Museum Philae temple complex

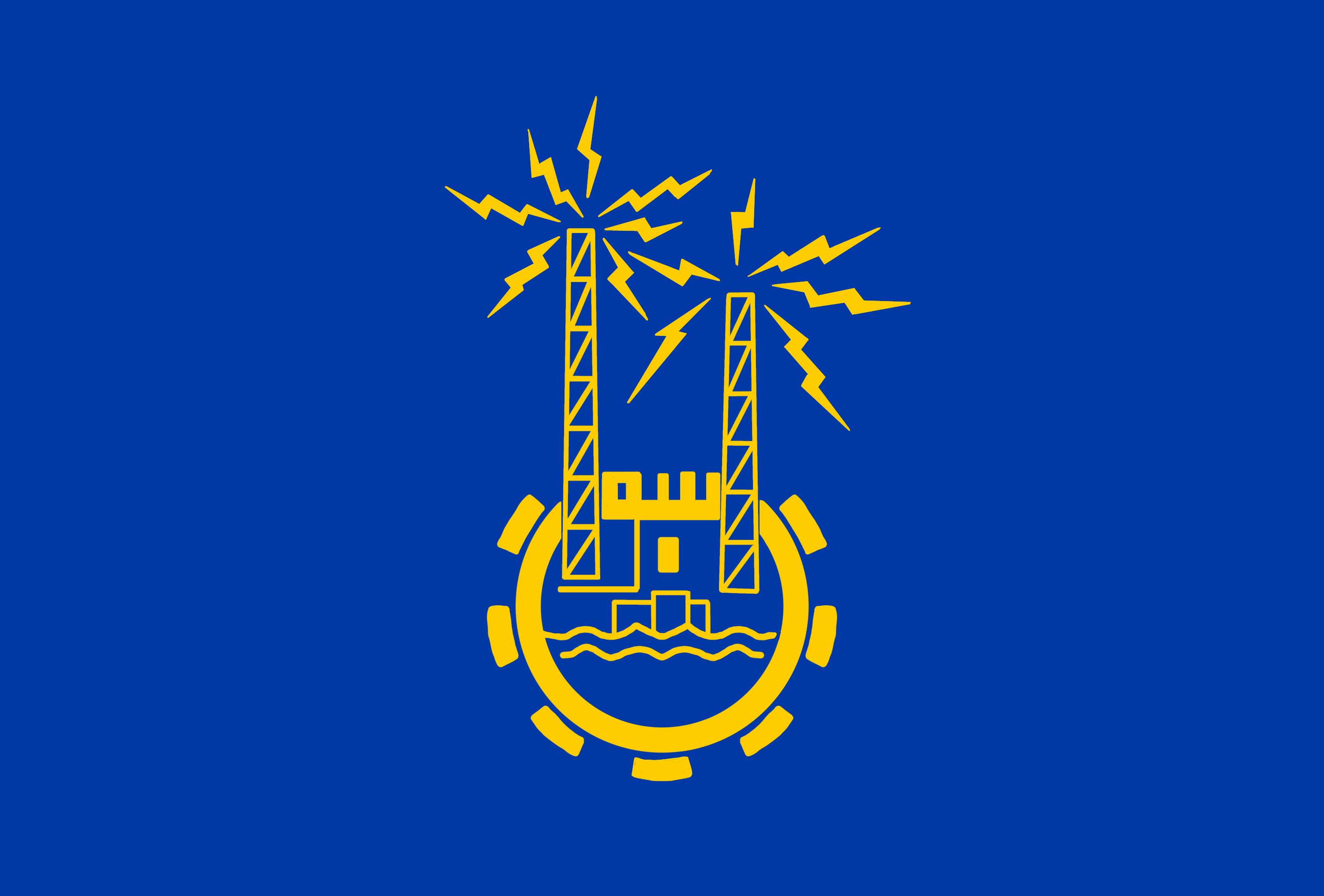
- Flag Seal

- Location within Egypt
- Coordinates: 24°05′20″N 32°53′59″E
- Country: Egypt
- Governorate: Aswan
- Settled: 600 BC

Area
  - Total: 375.39 km^{2} (144.94 sq mi)
- Elevation: 99 m (325 ft)

Population (2024)
  - Total: 370,000
  - Density: 990/km^{2} (2,600/sq mi)
- Demonym(s): Aswani (Male, Arabic: أسواني) Aswaniyah (Female, Arabic: أسوانية)

GDP (nominal, constant 2015 values)
  - Year: 2024
  - Total: $2.0 billion
  - Per capita: $5,405
- Time zone: UTC+2 (EET)
  - Summer (DST): UTC+3 (EEST)
- Area code: (+20) 97
Designations
UNESCO World Heritage Site
- Official name: Nubian Monuments from Abu Simbel to Philae
- Type: Cultural
- Criteria: i, iii, vi
- Designated: 1979 (3rd session)
- Reference no.: 89
- Region: Egyptian Governorates, Northern Africa, African Union

Aswan (Note: Egyptian Arabic: أسوان, romanized: ʾAswān [ʔɑsˈwɑːn], (/æsˈwɑːn, ɑːs-/, US: /ˈæswɑːn, ˈɑːs-, ˈæz-/) is a city in Upper Egypt and the capital of the Aswan Governorate. The city of Aswan is among the oldest continuously inhabited cities, with its recorded history spanning over 2,600 years.

Aswan is a busy market and tourist centre located just north of the Aswan Dam on the east bank of the Nile at the first cataract. The city was the southern frontier of Ancient Egypt. Aswan's local quarries supplied granite to many ancient Egyptian monuments, and these quarries are still operating today. The modern city has expanded and includes the formerly separate community on the island of Elephantine. Aswan is considered a global tourist winter destination.

Aswan includes five monuments within the UNESCO World Heritage Site of the Nubian Monuments from Abu Simbel to Philae; these are the Old and Middle Kingdom tombs of Qubbet el-Hawa, the town of Elephantine, the stone quarries and Unfinished Obelisk, the Monastery of St. Simeon and the Fatimid Cemetery. The city's Nubian Museum is an important archaeological center, containing finds from the International Campaign to Save the Monuments of Nubia before the Aswan Dam flooded all of Lower Nubia.

The city is part of the UNESCO Creative Cities Network in the category of craft and folk art. Aswan joined the UNESCO Global Network of Learning Cities in 2017.

== Other spellings and variations ==
Aswan was formerly spelled Assuan or Assouan. Names in other languages include (Arabic: أسوان, romanized: ʾAswān; Ancient Egyptian: Swenett; Coptic: Ⲥⲟⲩⲁⲛ, romanized: Souan; Ancient Greek: Συήνη, romanized: Suēnē; proposed Biblical Hebrew: סְוֵנֵה Sǝwēnê). The Nubians also call the city Dib which means "fortress, palace" and is derived from the Old Nubian name ⲇⲡ̅ⲡⲓ.

== History ==
s wn n t niwt
swnt
in hieroglyphs
Era: Late Period
(664–332 BC)

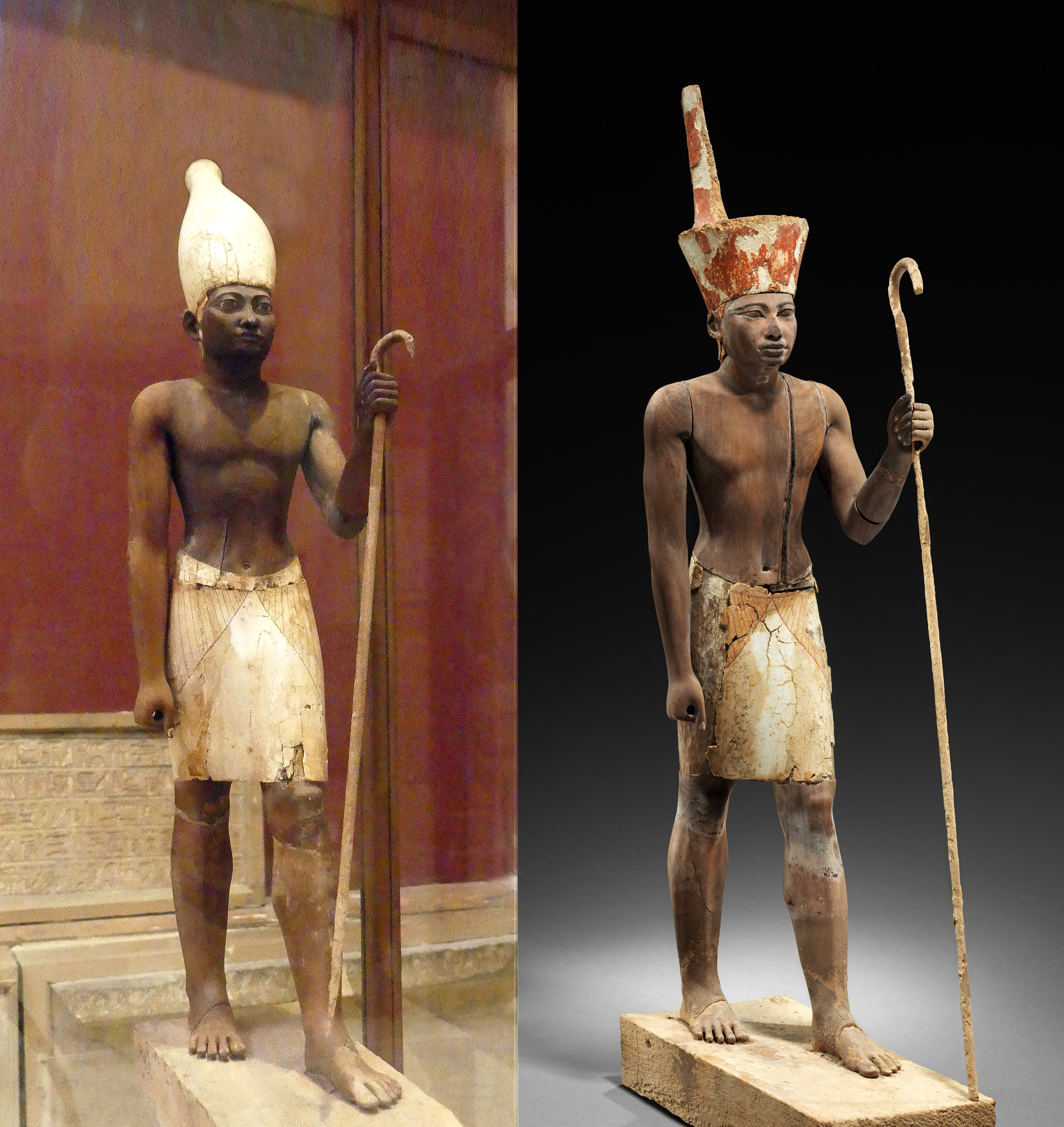
Pair of guardian statuettes, depicting Middle Kingdom pharaohs, presumably Senusret I or Amenemhat II, with the white crown of Upper Egypt (left), the other with the red crown of Lower Egypt. The 12th dynasty had origins in Ta-Seti, located in the modern Aswan territory.

Aswan is the ancient city of Swenett, later known as Syene, which in antiquity was the frontier town of Ancient Egypt facing the south. Swenett is supposed to have derived its name from an Egyptian goddess with the same name. This goddess later was identified as Eileithyia by the Greeks and Lucina by the Romans during their occupation of Ancient Egypt because of the similar association of their goddesses with childbirth, and of which the import is "the opener". The ancient name of the city also is said to be derived from the Egyptian symbol for "trade", or "market".

Because the Ancient Egyptians oriented themselves toward the origin of the life-giving waters of the Nile in the south, and as Swenett was the southernmost town in the country, Egypt always was conceived to "open" or begin at Swenett. The city stood upon a peninsula on the right (east) bank of the Nile, immediately below (and north of) the first cataract of the flowing waters, which extended to it from Philae. Navigation to the delta was possible from this location without encountering a barrier.

The stone quarries of ancient Egypt located here were celebrated for their stone, and especially for the granitic rock called syenite. They furnished the colossal statues, obelisks, and monolithic shrines that are found throughout Egypt, including the pyramids; and the traces of the quarrymen who worked (alongside domesticated draft animals) in these 3,000 years ago are still visible in the native rock. They lie on either bank of the Nile, and a road, 6.5 km (4.0 mi) in length, was cut beside them from Syene to Philae.

Swenett was equally important as a military station and for its position on a trade route. Under every dynasty it was a garrison town; and here tolls and customs were levied on all boats passing southwards and northwards. Around 330, the legion stationed here received a bishop from Alexandria; this later became the Coptic Diocese of Syene. The city is mentioned by numerous ancient writers, including Herodotus, Strabo, Stephanus of Byzantium, Ptolemy, Pliny the Elder, Vitruvius, and it appears on the Antonine Itinerary. It may also be mentioned in the Book of Ezekiel and the Book of Isaiah.

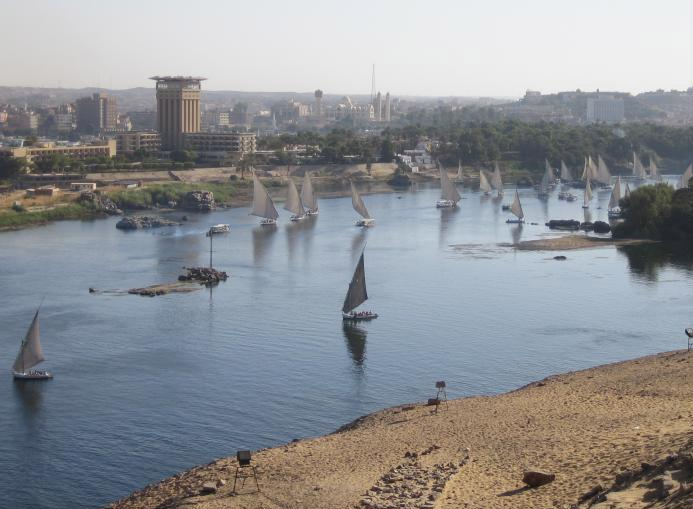
View from the west bank of the Nile, islands, and Aswan

The Nile is nearly 650 m (0.40 mi) wide above Aswan. From this frontier town to the northern extremity of Egypt, the river flows for more than 1,200 km (750 mi) without bar or cataract. The voyage from Aswan to Alexandria usually took 21 to 28 days in favorable weather.

=== Archaeological findings ===
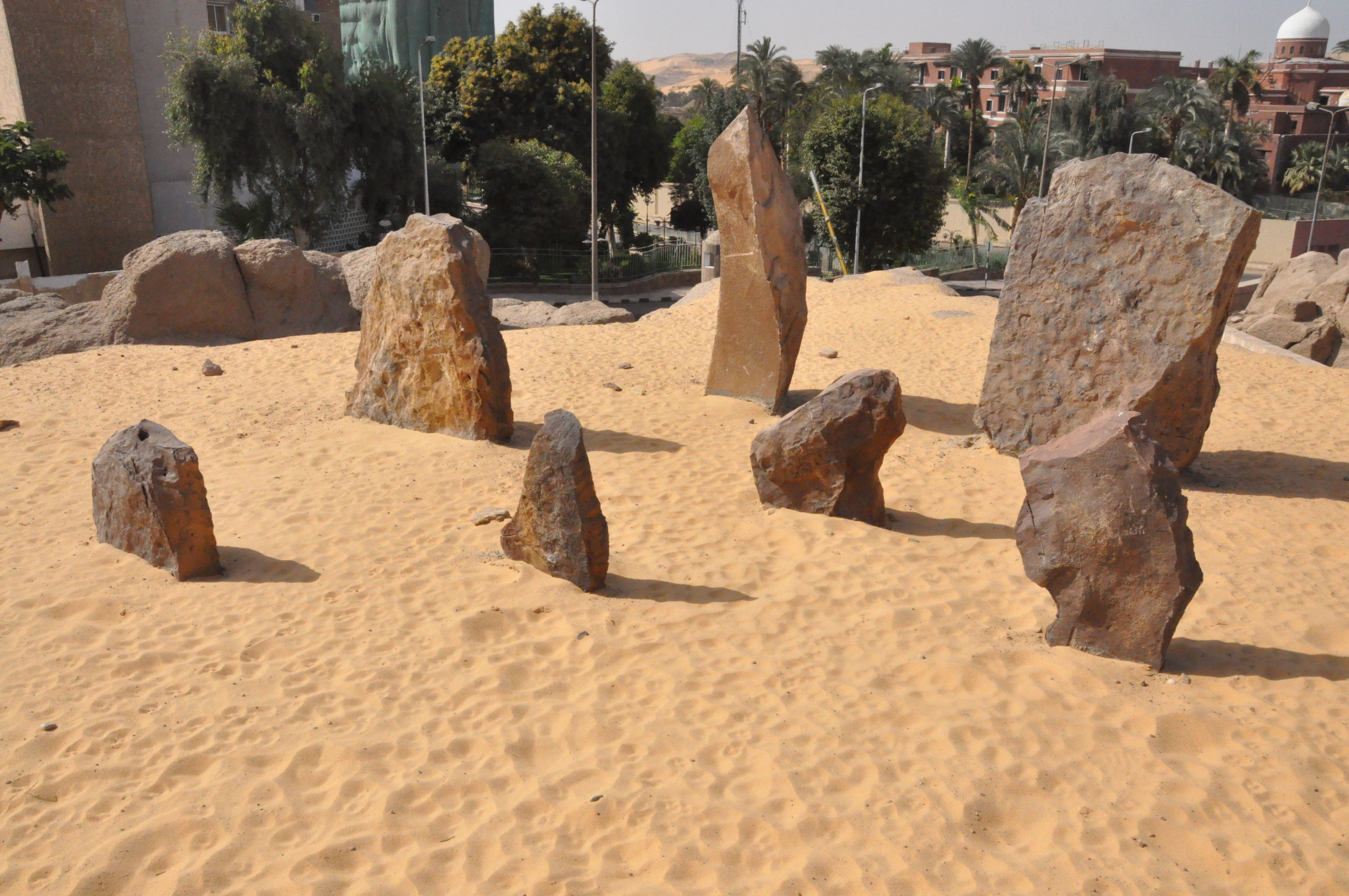
Megaliths from Nabta Playa displayed in Aswan, Upper Egypt

In April 2018, the Egyptian Ministry of Antiquities announced the discovery of the head of the bust of Roman Emperor Marcus Aurelius at the Temple of Kom Ombo during work to protect the site from groundwater.

In September 2018, the then Egyptian Antiquities Minister Khaled el-Enany announced that a sandstone sphinx statue had been discovered at the temple of Kom Ombo. The statue, measuring approximately 28 cm (11 in) in width and 38 cm (15 in)) in height, probably dates to the Ptolemaic Dynasty.

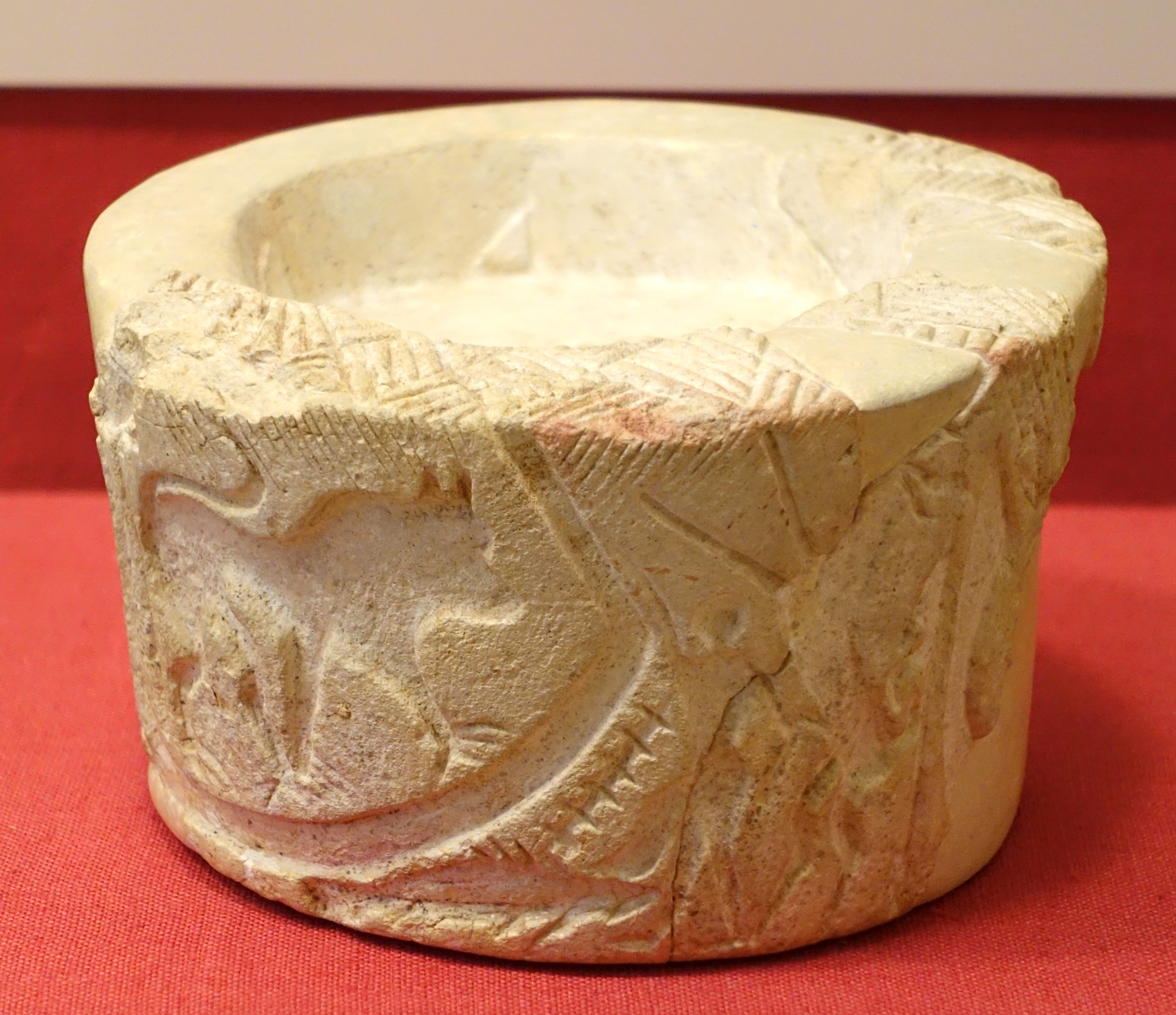
Qustul Incense Burner, excavated from a royal Nubian tomb in Lake Nasser, considered among the earliest representations of the White Crown Hedjet in Upper Egypt.

Archaeologists discovered 35 mummified remains of Egyptians in a tomb in Aswan in 2019. Italian archaeologist Patrizia Piacentini and El-Enany both reported that the tomb, where the remains of ancient men, women and children were found, dates back to the Greco-Roman period between 332 BC and 395 AD. While the findings assumed to belong to a mother and a child were well preserved, others had suffered major destruction. Other than the mummies, artifacts including painted funerary masks, vases of bitumen used in mummification, pottery and wooden figurines were revealed. Thanks to the hieroglyphs on the tomb, it was detected that the tomb belongs to a tradesman named Tjit.

Piacentini commented "It's a very important discovery because we have added something to the history of Aswan that was missing. We knew about tombs and necropoli dating back to the second and third millennium, but we didn't know where the people who lived in the last part of the Pharaonic era were. Aswan, on the southern border of Egypt, was also a very important trading city".

Stan Hendrick, John Coleman Darnell and Maria Gatto in 2012 excavated petroglyphic engravings from Nag el-Hamdulab in Aswan which featured representations of a boat procession, solar symbolism and the earliest depiction of the White Crown with an estimated dating range between 320 0BC and 3100 BC.

In February 2021, archaeologists from the Egyptian Ministry of Antiquities announced significant discoveries at an archaeological site called Shiha Fort in Aswan, namely a Ptolemaic period temple, a Roman fort, an early Coptic church and an inscription in hieratic script. According to Mostafa Waziri, the crumbling temple was decorated with palm leaf carvings and an incomplete sandstone panel that described a Roman emperor. Researcher Abdel Badie states more generally that the church contained ovens used to bake pottery, four rooms, a long hall, stairs, and stone tiles.

In July 2024, a joint Egyptian–French archaeological expedition conducting an underwater photographic survey between the old Aswan Dam and the Aswan High Dam uncovered a trove of rock carvings, stelae, inscriptions, and miniature royal images submerged in the Nile near Aswan. The discoveries include representations of New Kingdom pharaohs Amenhotep III and Thutmose IV and Late Period rulers Psamtik II and Apries. Initial research suggests these finds, dating back to the Eighteenth Dynasty (c. 1550–1295 BC) through the Late Period (c. 747–332 BC), may shed new light on shifting political and religious practices in southern Egypt. These artifacts were initially discovered during the Nubian Monuments Rescue Campaign in the 1960s.

In June 2025, archaeologists announced the discovery of three Old Kingdom tombs at the Qubbet el-Hawa necropolis. The tombs, dated to the late 6th Dynasty (circa 2300–2100 BC), consist of vertical shafts, small courtyards, false doors, offering tables, and pottery vessels. Human remains were also recovered, with evidence suggesting that the tombs were later reused during the Middle Kingdom. Although some of the tombs lacked inscriptions, they still exhibited traditional burial architecture and customs, which, according to the archaeologists, may indicate that the individuals buried there had limited economic means.

== Geography ==
=== Northern Tropic boundary ===
The latitude of the city that would become Aswan – located at 24° 5′ 23″ – was an object of great interest to the ancient geographers and mathematicians. They believed that it was seated immediately under the tropic, and that on the day of the summer solstice, a vertically positioned staff cast no shadow. They noted that the sun's disc was reflected in a deep well (or pit) at noon. This statement is only approximately correct. At the summer solstice, the shadow was only 1/400 of the staff, and so could scarcely be discerned, and the northern limb of the Sun's disc would be nearly vertical. Around 240 BC, Greek polymath Eratosthenes used this information to calculate Earth's circumference.

=== Climate ===
Aswan has a hot desert climate (Köppen climate classification BWh) like the rest of Egypt. Aswan and Luxor have the hottest summer days of any city in Egypt. Aswan is one of the hottest, sunniest and driest cities in the world. Average high temperatures are consistently above 40 °C (104.0 °F) during summer (June, July, August and also September) while average low temperatures remain above 25 °C (77.0 °F). Average high temperatures remain above 23 °C (73.4 °F) during the coldest month of the year while average low temperatures remain above 8 °C (46.4 °F). Summers are very prolonged and extremely hot with blazing sunshine although desert heat is dry. Winters are brief and pleasantly mild, though nights may be cool at times.

The climate of Aswan is extremely dry year-round, with less than 1 mm (0.04 in) of average annual precipitation. The desert city is one of the driest ones in the world, and rainfall does not occur every year; in early 2001, the last rain in Aswan had been seven years earlier. When heavy precipitation does occur, as in a November 2021 rain and hail storm, flash flooding can drive scorpions from their lairs to deadly effects. Aswan is one of the least humid cities on the planet, with an average relative humidity of only 26%, with a maximum mean of 42% during winter and a minimum mean of 16% during summer.

The weather of Aswan is extremely clear, bright and sunny year-round in all seasons, with low seasonal variation and almost 4,000 hours of annual sunshine – very close to the maximum theoretical sunshine duration. Aswan is one of the sunniest places on Earth.

The highest record temperature was 51 °C (124 °F) on July 4, 1918, and the lowest record temperature was −2.4 °C (27.7 °F) on January 6, 1989.

Climate data for Aswan (1991–2020, extremes 1918–present)
Month	Jan	Feb	Mar	Apr	May	Jun	Jul	Aug	Sep	Oct	Nov	Dec	Year
Record high °C (°F)	35.3 (95.5)	38.5 (101.3)	44.0 (111.2)	46.1 (115.0)	49.4 (120.9)	50.9 (123.6)	51.0 (123.8)	48.6 (119.5)	47.8 (118.0)	45.4 (113.7)	42.2 (108.0)	38.6 (101.5)	51.0 (123.8)
Mean maximum °C (°F)	29.8 (85.6)	33.6 (92.5)	38.7 (101.7)	42.4 (108.3)	45.1 (113.2)	46.5 (115.7)	46.3 (115.3)	45.8 (114.4)	43.9 (111.0)	41.2 (106.2)	35.6 (96.1)	31.0 (87.8)	47.2 (117.0)
Mean daily maximum °C (°F)	23.2 (73.8)	25.9 (78.6)	30.3 (86.5)	35.5 (95.9)	39.5 (103.1)	41.6 (106.9)	41.9 (107.4)	41.9 (107.4)	40.0 (104.0)	36.4 (97.5)	29.8 (85.6)	24.5 (76.1)	34.2 (93.6)
Daily mean °C (°F)	16.3 (61.3)	18.6 (65.5)	22.9 (73.2)	28.0 (82.4)	32.2 (90.0)	34.4 (93.9)	35.1 (95.2)	35.0 (95.0)	32.7 (90.9)	29.2 (84.6)	22.7 (72.9)	17.6 (63.7)	27.0 (80.6)
Mean daily minimum °C (°F)	10.0 (50.0)	11.7 (53.1)	15.5 (59.9)	20.1 (68.2)	24.6 (76.3)	26.7 (80.1)	27.8 (82.0)	27.9 (82.2)	25.5 (77.9)	22.3 (72.1)	16.2 (61.2)	11.4 (52.5)	20.0 (68.0)
Mean minimum °C (°F)	5.3 (41.5)	6.6 (43.9)	9.4 (48.9)	13.8 (56.8)	17.6 (63.7)	20.9 (69.6)	22.3 (72.1)	22.4 (72.3)	20.4 (68.7)	16.7 (62.1)	11.2 (52.2)	7.0 (44.6)	4.5 (40.1)
Record low °C (°F)	−2.4 (27.7)	3.8 (38.8)	5.0 (41.0)	7.8 (46.0)	13.4 (56.1)	18.9 (66.0)	20.0 (68.0)	20.0 (68.0)	16.1 (61.0)	12.2 (54.0)	6.1 (43.0)	0.6 (33.1)	−2.4 (27.7)
Average rainfall mm (inches)	0.1 (0.00)	0.0 (0.0)	0.6 (0.02)	0.3 (0.01)	0.1 (0.00)	0.0 (0.0)	0.0 (0.0)	0.0 (0.0)	0.1 (0.00)	0.7 (0.03)	0.0 (0.0)	0.1 (0.00)	2.0 (0.08)
Average rainy days (≥ 1 mm)	0.0	0.0	0.1	0.1	0.0	0.0	0.0	0.0	0.0	0.1	0.0	0.0	0.4
Average relative humidity (%)	40	32	24	19	17	16	18	21	22	27	36	42	26.2
Average dew point °C (°F)	1.4 (34.5)	0.1 (32.2)	0.0 (32.0)	0.5 (32.9)	2.2 (36.0)	3.1 (37.6)	5.7 (42.3)	7.2 (45.0)	6.5 (43.7)	6.4 (43.5)	4.6 (40.3)	3.1 (37.6)	3.4 (38.1)
Mean monthly sunshine hours	298.2	281.1	321.6	316.1	346.8	363.2	374.6	359.6	298.3	314.6	299.6	289.1	3,862.8
Percentage possible sunshine	82	85	86	89	92	94	93	92	90	88	86	81	88
Source 1: NOAA (humidity, dew point, sun 1961–1990)
Source 2: Meteo Climat (record temperatures)and Egyptian Meteorological Authority / NOAA

== Economy ==
=== Overview ===
Aswan's economy relies on a mix of tourism (archaeological and Nile-based), agriculture, such as; date palms, hibiscus, and seasonal crops, and diverse industries such as; quarries (stone and aggregates) and mines. This is further supported by significant government efforts to promote development through logistics zones, industrial areas, and their connection to the high-speed electric rail network to serve trade and industry and create jobs. The focus is on investing in infrastructure and developing key economic sectors to achieve sustainable development.

Agriculture outside the city include Date palm cultivation, hibiscus (a signature product), tamarind, vegetables. In the industrial sector, the quarries (stone and aggregates), manufacturing industries, such as; Egyptian Chemical Industries, and the El-Alaqi industrial zone. The development of Aswan International Airport, establishment of logistics zones in Wadi Karkar, and high-speed electric rail services to facilitate trade with Africa.

The Egyptian Chemical Industries Company, known as KIMA, was established by a decision of the Egyptian Government in March 1956. It is a company that operates in the materials sector with a focus on various chemical materials.

=== Tourism ===
Old Cataract Hotel

Tourism is considered a vital sector for the city's economy and is generally based on archaeological sites and the Nile's natural beauty with its broad views across the city, with plans for sustainable infrastructure development and promotion. Aswan is one of the world's premier destinations for archaeological tourism; the city is renowned for its ancient Egyptian and Nubian cultures, and its massive ancient temples, such as the Philae temple complex.

The city’s hotels are clustered along the Nile river, including large hotels, island-based resorts and Nubian guesthouses on the West Bank of the Nile. Premium accommodations span from historic Victorian-era palaces to colorful, community-run eco-lodges, all situated near ancient Egyptian monuments and riverside tourist attractions. Aswan named the Tourist City of the Year for 2026 by the D-8 Organization for Economic Cooperation.

=== Water resources ===
==== Aswan High Dam ====
Road to the Aswan High Dam and Lake Nasser

The symbol of friendship is in the form of an open lotus flower with five petals. It was created by the Egyptian Reinforced Cement Company. The designer chose the lotus flower for its sacred significance to the ancient Egyptians, representing its rising above the water's surface with its five petals open at sunrise and closing them at sunset before submerging again. Its creation came after the United States and Britain refused to finance the project. The dam was seen as pivotal to the country's industrialization plans. Like the earlier implementation, the High Dam has had a significant effect on the economy and culture of Egypt.

==== Lake Nasser ====
Lake Nasser, is one of the world's largest artificial lakes, located in south of Aswan, and extending into northern Sudan. The name Lake Nasser refers to the larger portion within Egypt, representing 83% of the lake's total area, while the remaining portion within Sudan is called Lake Nubia. It was formed by the waters impounded behind the Aswan High Dam after its construction (which lasted from 1958 to 1970), and was named after the former Egyptian President Gamal Abdel Nasser (1918–1970).

==== Aswan Low Dam ====
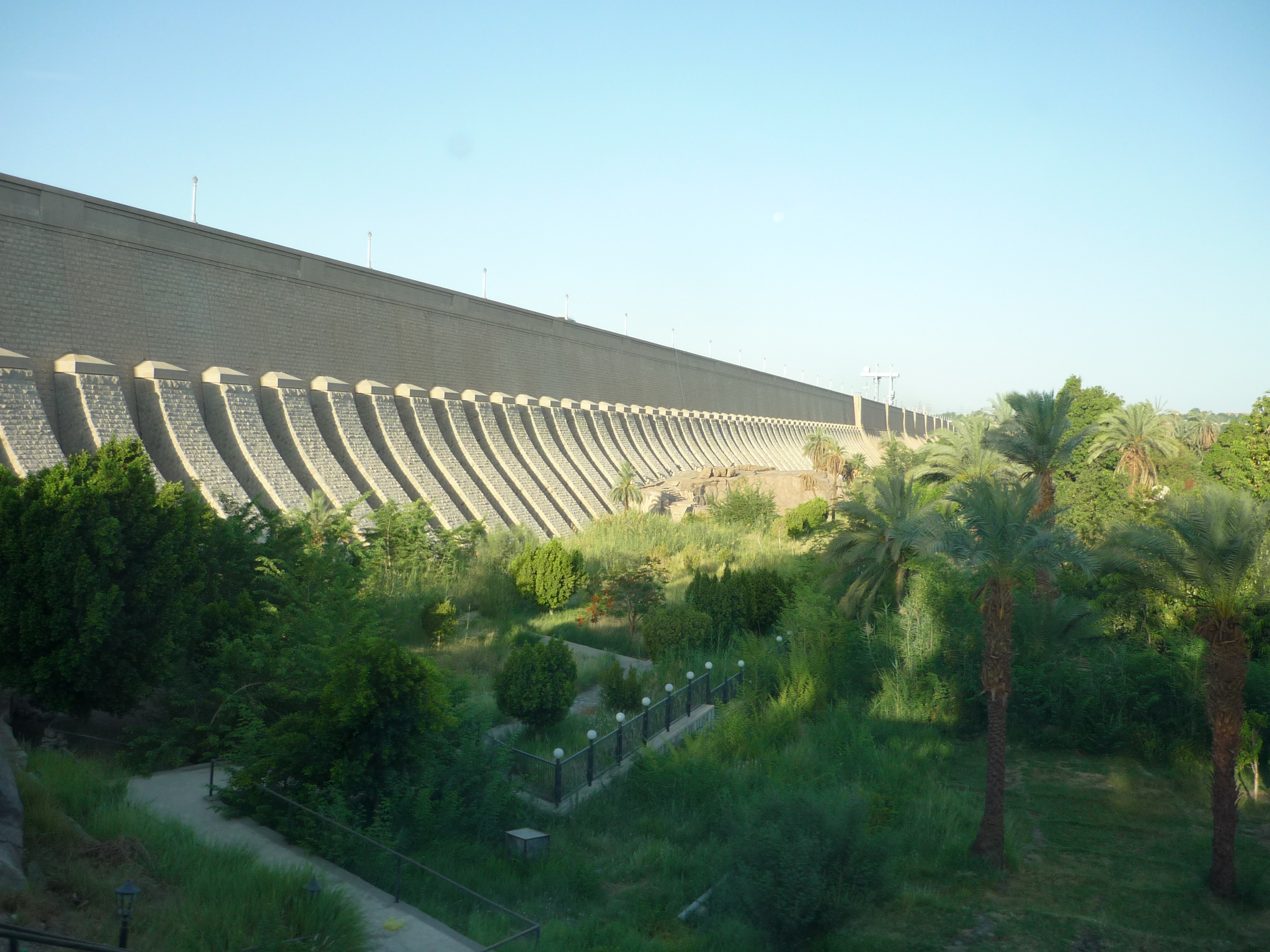
Aswan Low Dam

It differs from the Aswan High Dam. Construction began in between 1899 and 1906. Its foundation stone was laid by Khedive Abbas Helmi II, and it was inaugurated during his reign. The old Aswan Dam was the first dam built of its size and the largest dam in the world at the time. It was raised in 1912 and again in 1926 to impound water during the Nile flood season, releasing it in the quantities needed for irrigation during the dry season. The reservoir is 2,141 meters long and 9 meters wide, with 180 gates, and is constructed of granite, a stone readily available in the region. The water released from the reservoir is used to power two hydroelectric stations: Aswan I and Aswan II. A road was also built across the reservoir, connecting the east and west banks of the Nile.

== Cityscape ==
=== Architecture ===
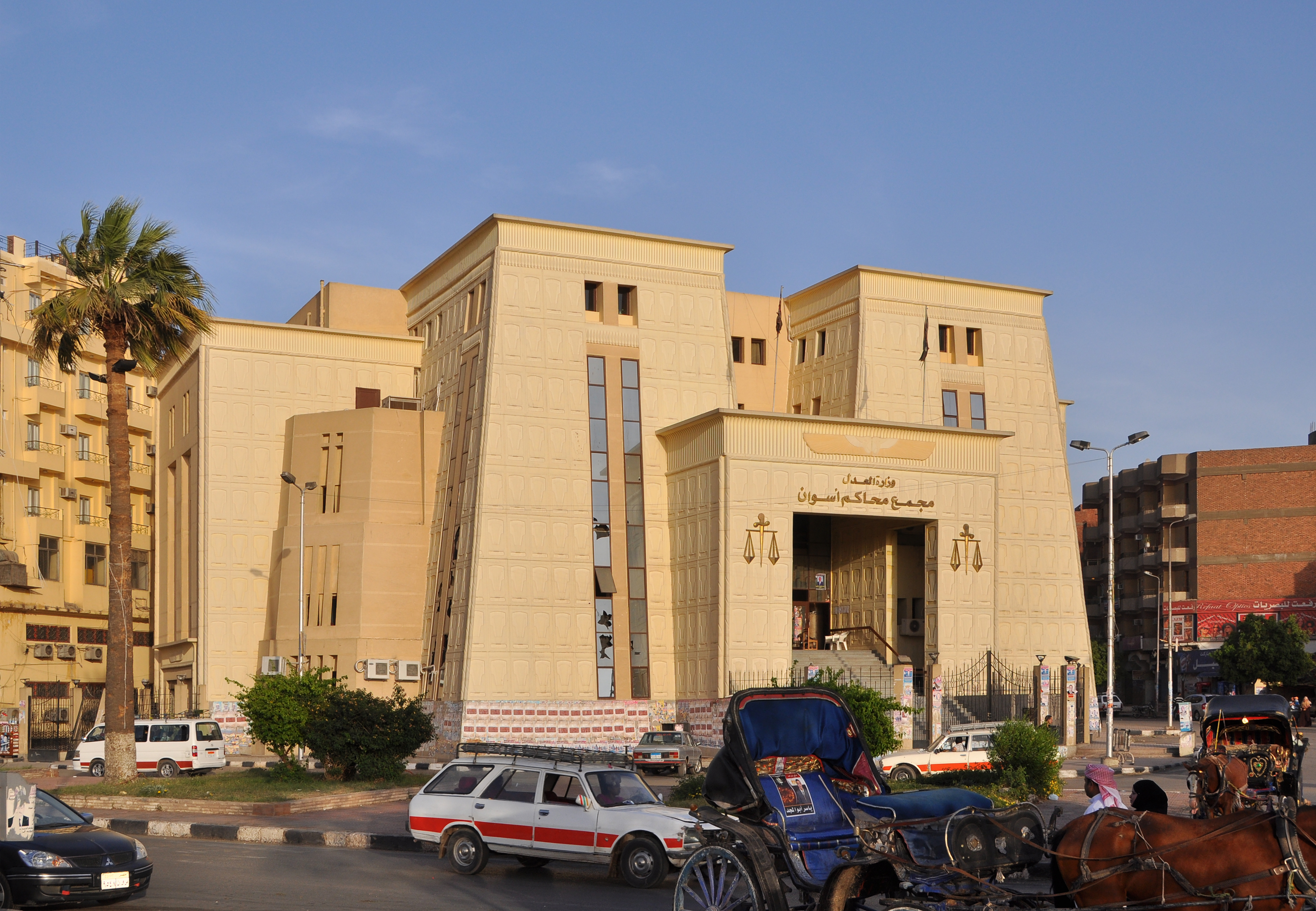
Aswan Courthouse

Egyptian architecture is known for its monumental stone structures, decorated with hieroglyphics and designed with symmetry and religious symbolism. Key features include massive pylons, grand courtyards, and hypostyle halls with columns inspired by plants like the papyrus and lotus. The following roundup looks at contemporary projects built across Egypt.

=== Landmarks ===
==== Elephantine Island ====
Located on a plateau on the west bank of the Nile, opposite the southern part of the Botanical Garden, the mausoleum was built by Aga Khan III at the request of the then-governor of Aswan. The governor had requested the purchase of the area where Aga Khan was receiving medical treatment, and Aga Khan then brought in engineers, architects, and workers to build him a magnificent mausoleum of limestone and marble. He was buried there. In 1959, according to his will, this tomb was inspired by the design of Fatimid Egyptian tombs.

==== Philae temple complex ====
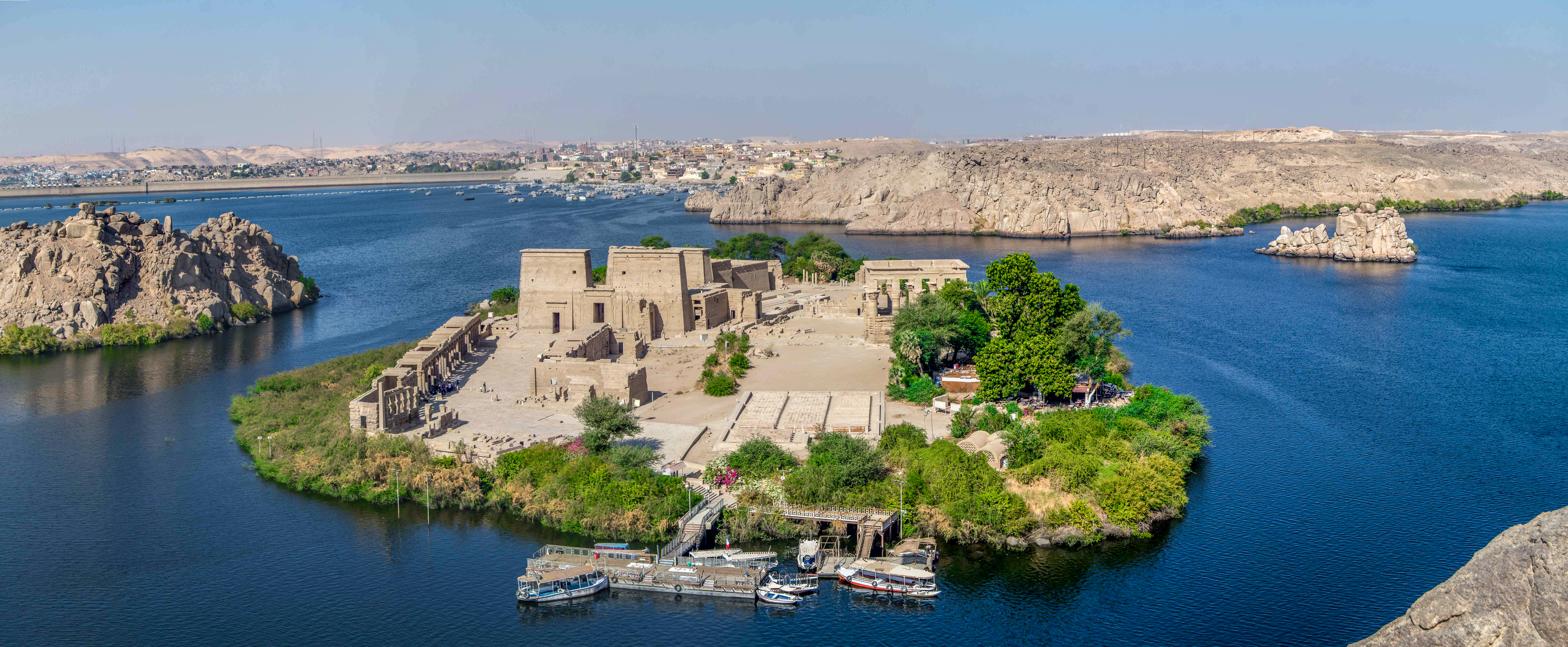
The Philae temple complex

The Philae Island was an island in the middle of the Nile River and one of the strongest fortresses along Egypt's southern border. It divides the Nile into two opposing channels at Aswan. The Philae temple complex was located there and was moved from its original location on Philae Island and reassembled on Agilkia Island following the construction of the Aswan High Dam. The temple was submerged by the Nile's waters. Its buildings include a temple to Hathor.

==== Abu Simbel Temple ====
An archaeological site located on the west bank of Lake Nasser, about 290 km southwest of Aswan. It is one of the Nubian Monuments listed on the UNESCO World Heritage List, which extends from Abu Simbel along the Nile to Philae.

Construction of the temple complex began around 1244 BC and continued for approximately 21 years. Dismantled, and reassembled at a new location 65 meters and 200 meters higher than the river level, some structures were even rescued from beneath the waters of Lake Nasser. Convoys of buses and escorted cars depart twice a day from Aswan, and many visitors arrive by plane at the Abu Simbel Airport, built specifically for the temple complex.

==== Nile Corniche ====
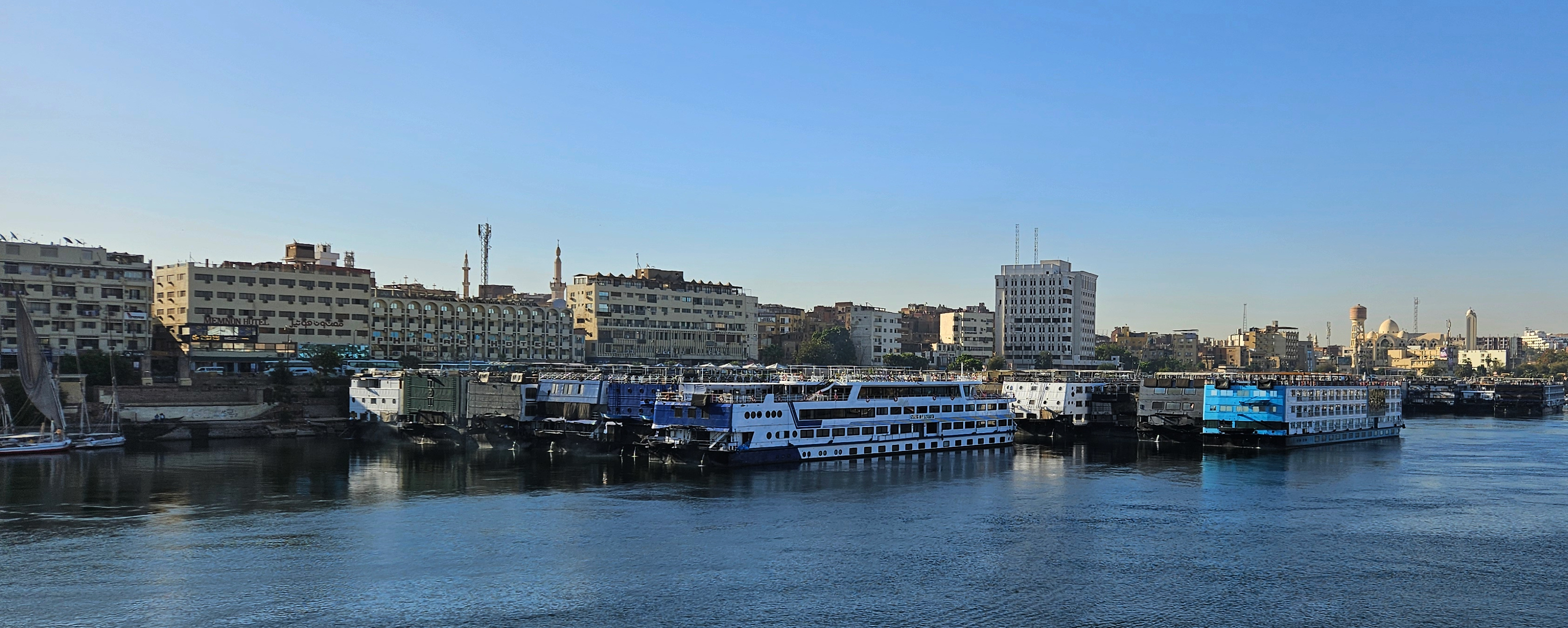
Nile Corniche in the Aswan city center

The Aswan Nile Corniche is a spacious promenade stretching along the eastern bank of the Nile. It has recently undergone a redevelopment project to become the Ahl Misr Walkway, now featuring modern cafes, shops, and bazaars, alongside a multi-level glass walkway that offers panoramic views of Elephantine Island and the feluccas gliding gently across the river. The recent development added 56 new commercial units, elevators, accessible pathways for people with special needs, and a third-level glass walkway.

==== Gharb Soheil ====
It is one of the Nubian communities in the city and is located on a sandy slope west of the Nile River. The village was established about one hundred years ago, when the old Aswan Dam was built in 1902, and its first heightening in 1912. The village's name is due to its location west of Soheil Island.

==== The Unfinished Obelisk ====
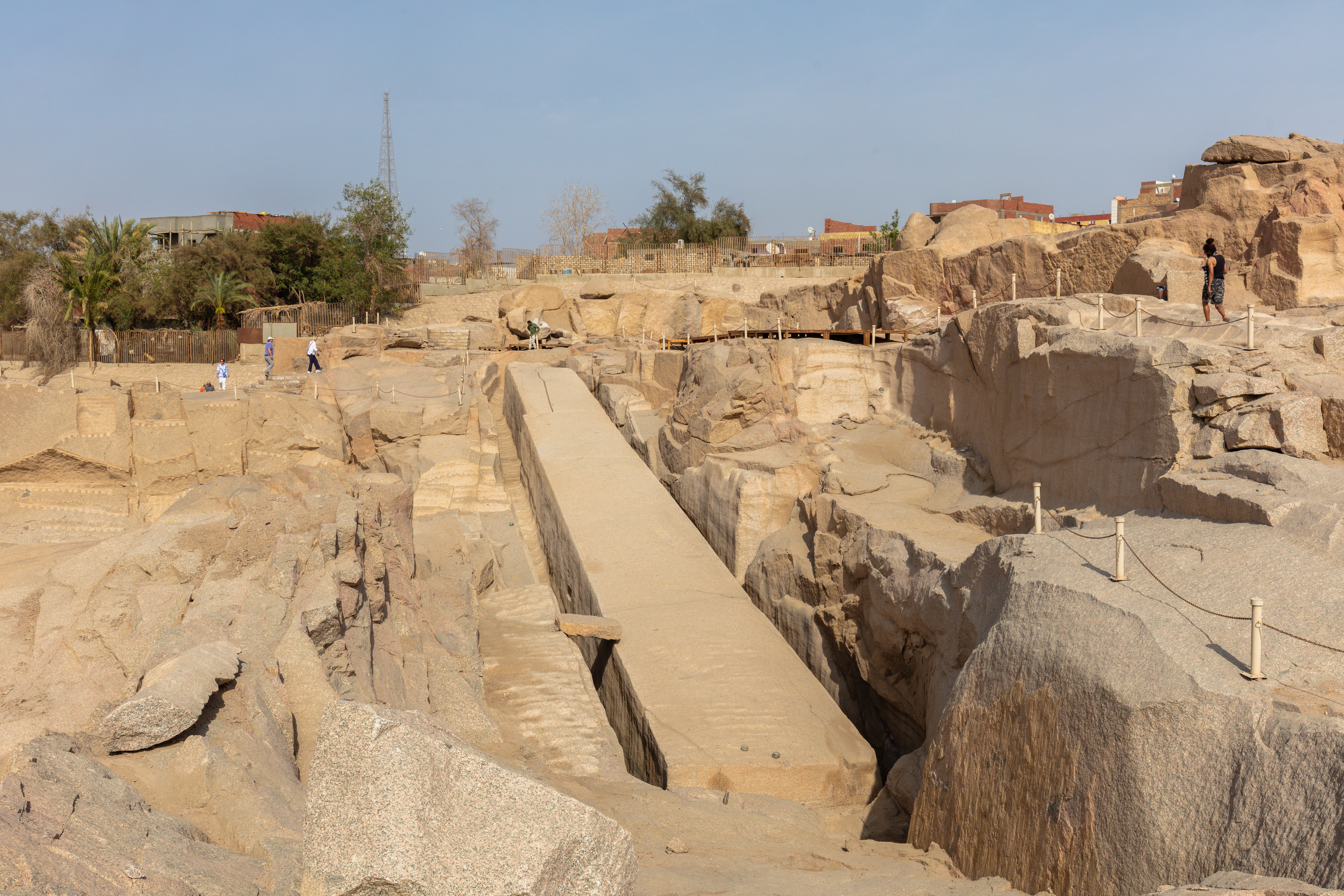
The Unfinished Obelisk

A pink granite obelisk, located in the northern part of a quarry near the city, on the east bank of the Nile, about 1 kilometer east of the river. The obelisk was intended to reach a height of approximately 41.7 meters, with a cross-sectional area of 4.2 meters by 4.2 meters at its base. Upon completion, it was projected to weigh around 1168 tons. It is believed that work on the obelisk began during the reign of Queen Hatshepsut, with the intention of transporting and erecting it at the Karnak Temple in the city of Luxor.

==== Qubbat el-Hawa ====
Qubbat el-Hawa is a rocky hill located on the west bank of the Nile near Aswan. The hill is about 130 meters high and contains carved tombs of nobles and priests of Aswan from the time of the ancient Egyptians. Also located on the southern summit of the mountain is the tomb of a Sidi Ali ibn al-Hawa, after whom the dome is named. It is a white shrine with a dome visible from afar, and below it lie the remains of a Coptic monastery (St. George).

The tombs of the ancient Egyptian nobles are located in three tiers high in the center of the mountain. The number of tombs from the time of the ancient Egyptians exceeds 100, containing the remains of approximately 1,000 men, women, and children, most of whom date back to the Old and New Kingdoms.

==== El Nabatat Island ====
View of El Nabatat island from the Nile banks.

It is considered one of the most important tourist attractions in Aswan and one of the oldest and largest botanical gardens in the world. The Garden covers an area of 17 acres and is divided into seven sections showcasing rare and perennial plant life. Suitable climatic conditions are created for these plants using greenhouses. The Aswan Botanical Garden occupies the entire island. It contains many rare trees and plants. Botanical Garden has been visited by many prominent historical figures, most notably: Jawaharlal Nehru, Joseph Tito, and Elizabeth II.

== Culture ==
=== Libraries ===
The Aswan branch of the Misr Public Library was inaugurated in 2001, as Aswan Public Library, was opened to the public in 2001. The library houses more than 60,000 books in diverse fields such as science, literature, history, and the arts. It offers services including book lending, cultural and training workshops, literary and intellectual events, as well as internet access and online research. The Misr Public Library in Aswan hosts events and workshops, including concerts. The library also welcomes student trips from schools and universities across Egypt.

=== Music ===
Aswan's music history is deeply rooted in ancient Egyptian traditions with vibrant Nubian culture, marked by sacred rituals and the Nile's influence, but dramatically impacted by the Aswan High Dam's construction, displacing communities and changing musical styles. Today, revitalization efforts like the Aswan Music Project blend traditional Nubian folk, devotional songs, and contemporary Egyptian sounds such as Shaabi music, preserving heritage while adapting for new generations, making music a key to Nubian identity and memory.

Music in Aswan was tied to religion, life, and cosmic beliefs, using harps, drums, and flutes in ceremonies, a legacy seen in temple art. Music is central to Nubian culture, with distinct styles like lament songs reflecting loss and connection to the land, often using instruments like the tambour.

Key figures from Aswan emerged in Cairo in the music industry, such as Mohamed Mounir and Ahmed Mounib, becoming major contributors to Egyptian music. Folk Genres's local styles include Fann al-Kaff (the art of clapping), where poets improvise verses to a rhythmic group, and Saidi music, often featuring the mizmar and rababa. As of 2025, Aswan has emerged as a destination for international electronic music events.

=== Aswan International Women's Film Festival ===
The annual Aswan International Women's Film Festival, established in 2017, is one of Egypt's premier film events. The festival is held under the patronage of the Egyptian ministries of Culture, Tourism, and Social Solidarity, and in association with the National Council for Women, the Aswan Governorate, and Aswan University, among other institution.

=== Museums ===
==== Nubian Museum ====
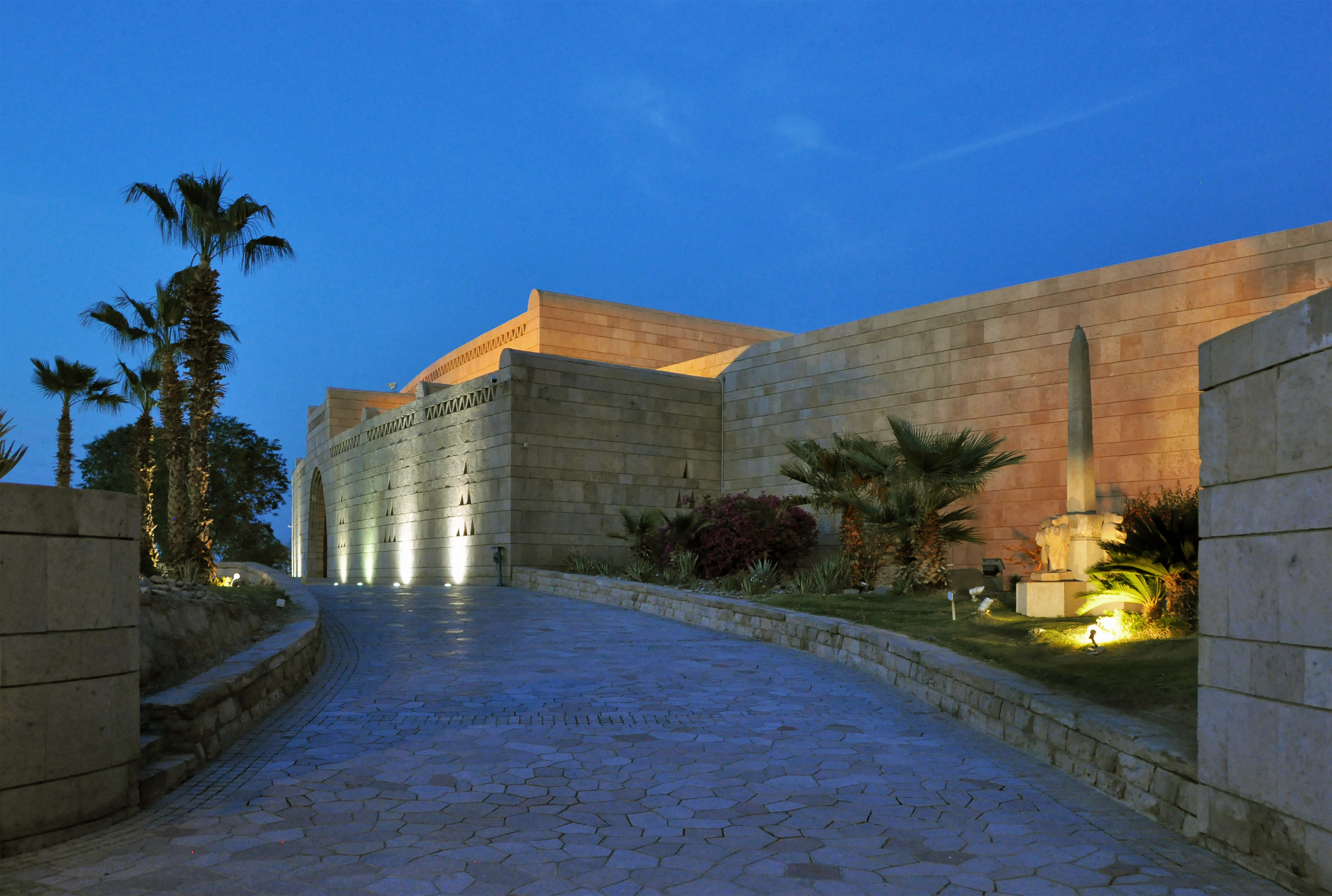
Museum entrance

The Nubian Museum (officially the International Museum of Nubia), an archaeological museum located in Aswan. It was built following the UNESCO International Campaign to Save the Monuments of Nubia. Dedicated to Nubian culture, heritage, and civilization, it was inaugurated in 1997.

==== The Nile Museum ====
The Nile Museum represents the culture of the eleven African countries that surrounds the Nile River. Opened to visitors in 2016, the museum is located on an area of 146,000 square meters, with 129,000 square meters were allocated for the museum's display. The museum includes exhibition halls, conferences, a library, a VIP hall, and administrative offices, in addition to a public site that includes the Magra El-Oyoun area and green spaces.

==== Aswan Museum ====
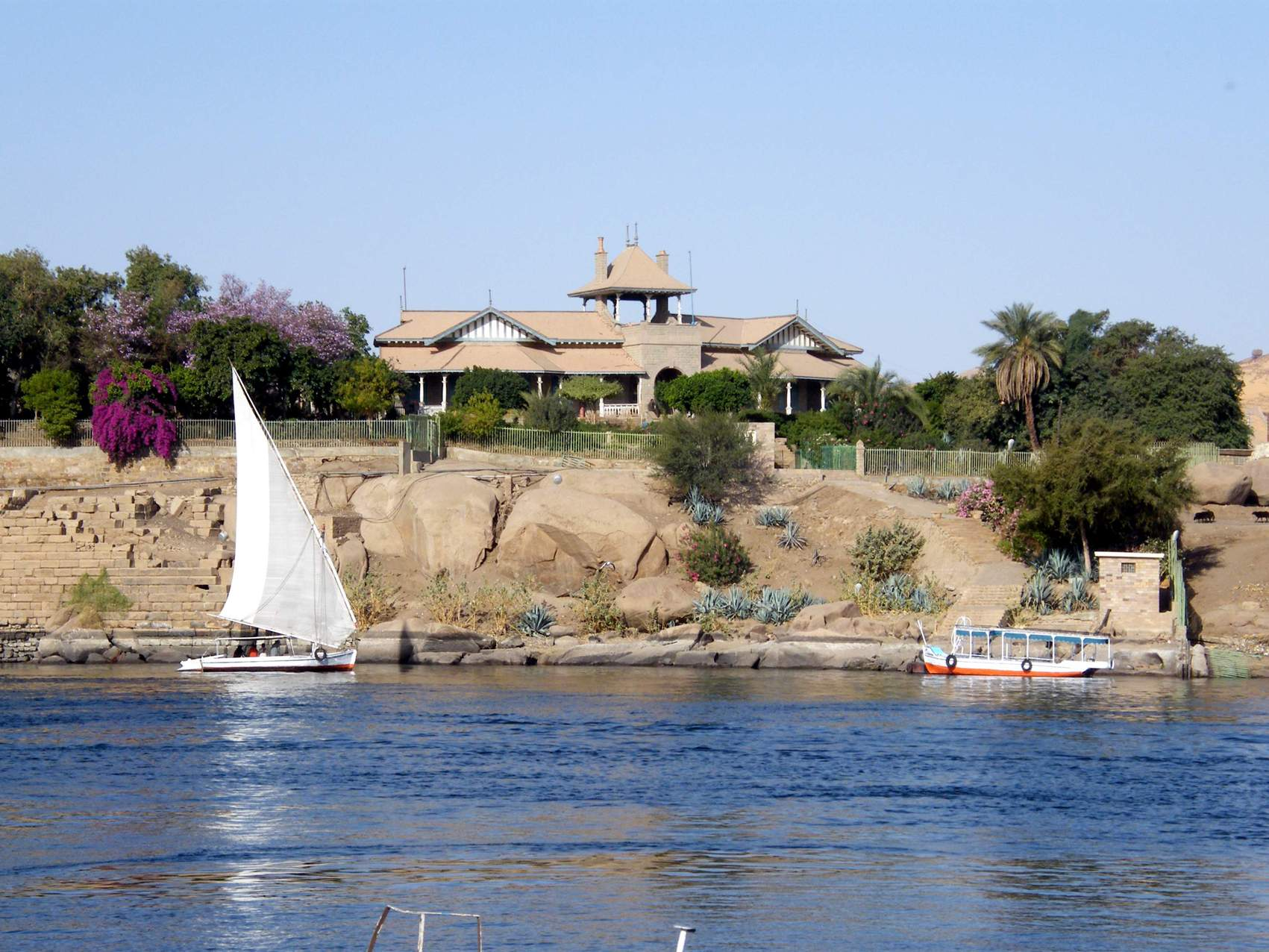
View of museum's facade from the Nile

The museum houses numerous statues of kings and individuals, some mummies of the ram, the symbol of the god Khnum, various types of pottery, architectural and decorative elements, a number of sarcophagi, everyday objects, and some funerary stelae. The newly established annex contains some of the artifacts discovered by the mission during its many years of excavation on the island.

The museum also includes a garden, caves inscribed with rock carvings, minarets in the Islamic style, a Nubian house surrounded by a lake, the Temple of the goddess Satet, the Temple of Hekaib, and a Nilometer.

=== Religious landmarks ===
El Tabia Mosque

The name originates from the area where the mosque was built. The history of the fort dates back to the beginning of the 19th century when it was a military fortification intended to house the first military academy in Modern Egypt. It was one of two military forts in Aswan built during the reign of Muhammad Ali Pasha, most of which have since fallen into ruin. Construction of the mosque began during the presidency of Gamal Abdel Nasser and it was inaugurated during the presidency of Anwar Sadat.

Archangel Michael's Coptic Orthodox Cathedral

The Archangel Michael's Coptic Orthodox Cathedral is a Coptic church is the second largest Coptic Orthodox cathedral in Egypt. Consecrated in 2006, the church is dedicated to Archangel Michael.

Monastery of St. Simeon

The Monastery of St. Simeon is the name given to the ruins of a 6th-century Coptic monastery west of the city. Earlier Coptic and Arabic sources called the monastery Deir Anba Hadra, after the 4th-century hermit and later Bishop of Syene (modern-day Aswan), Anba Hadra. It was later renamed Deir Anba Samaan after Simon (Simeon), a Coptic saint known as Simon the Tanner. This name was adopted by archaeologists and travelers for the ruined monastery.

Fatimid Cemeteries

The southern cemetery is located on the Aswan Reservoir Road, next to the Nubian Museum, while the northern cemetery is located in the Anani area. The domes are distinguished by their octagonal faces, known as horns, which face the dome, dating back to the 4th century AH (10th century AD).

Mausoleum of Aga Khan

The Mausoleum of Aga Khan is the mausoleum of Aga Khan III (Sir Sultan Muhammed Shah, who died in 1957). The mausoleum is located along the Nile, since Egypt was formerly the centre of power of the Fatimids. It is now also the resting place of Aga Khan IV.

== Infrastructure ==
=== Education ===
Aswan University

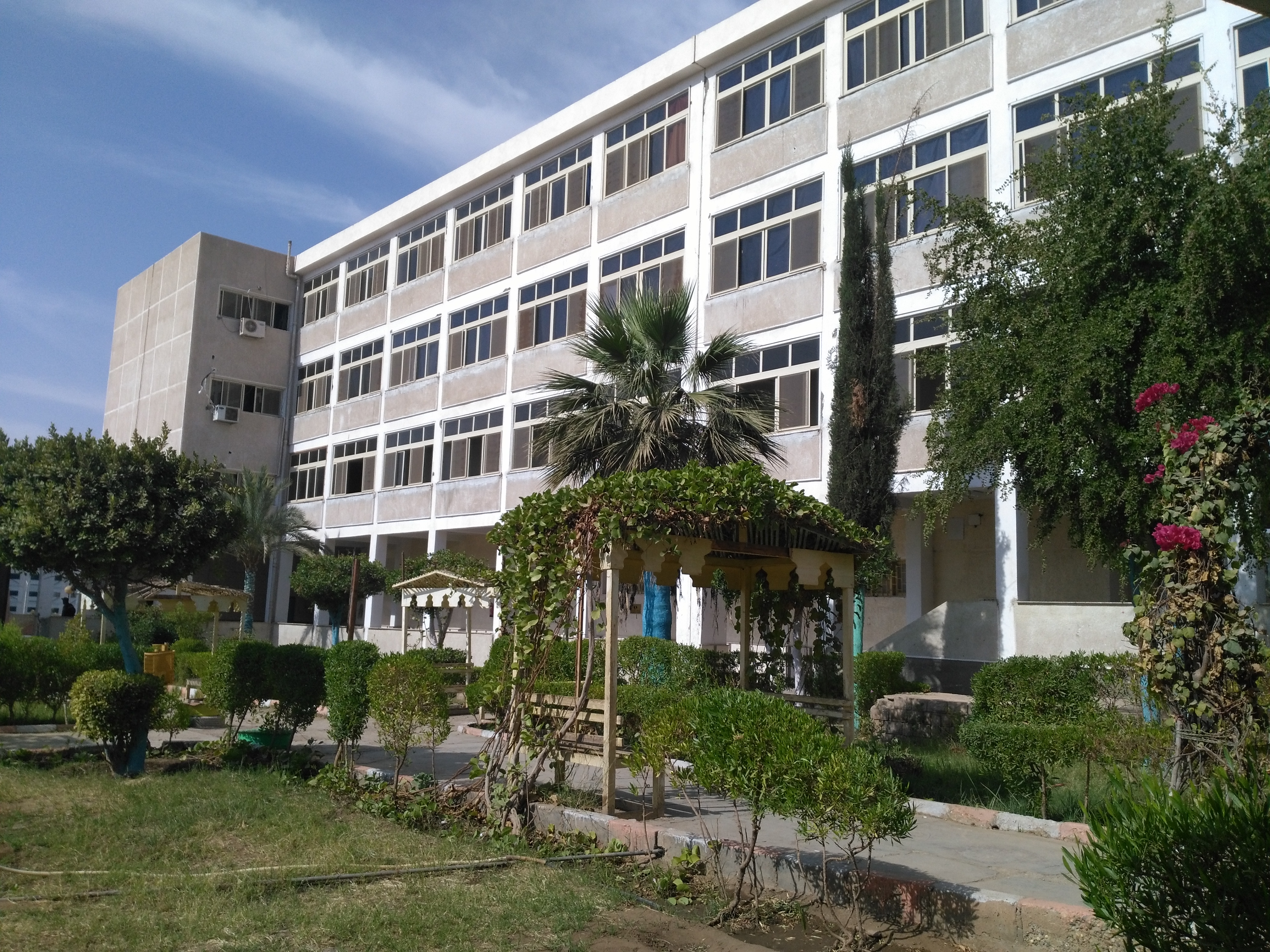
Faculty of Engineering, Aswan University

In 2012, the Aswan University was inaugurated, which is headquartered in the city. Aswan is also home to the Aswan Higher Institute of Social Work, which was established in 1975.

Arab Academy for Science, Technology and Maritime Transport

The Aswan Governorate invited the Academy to establish a branch in Aswan in 2005, in order to serve as a center for promoting human development in the South region, which includes the governorates of Aswan, Luxor, Qena, Sohag, Assiut, Minya, the Red Sea, and New Valley. Studies commenced in the academy in October 2006.

Al-Azhar University

The Faculty of Islamic and Arabic Studies (Boys Branch), includes various departments of Islamic Theology (Quranic Exegesis and Sciences, Hadith and its Sciences, Creed and Philosophy) and Islamic Law. The Al-Azhar Girls' College in Aswan, includes other cultural specializations in addition to Sharia sciences.

=== Health ===
Health care and emergency medical service in the City of Aswan and its suburbs are provided by several hospitals such as Aswan University Hospitals. Other medical facilities include; Aswan Specialized Hospital, AMC Aswan, Evangelical Mission Hospital, Aswan Heart Center, Magdy Yacoub Foundation, Aswan General Hospital, Military Hospital, Aswan, Health Insurance Hospital, Nile Specialized Hospital, Red Crescent Specialized Hospital, Aswan Mental Health Hospital and other medical facilities.

=== Transport ===
==== Air ====
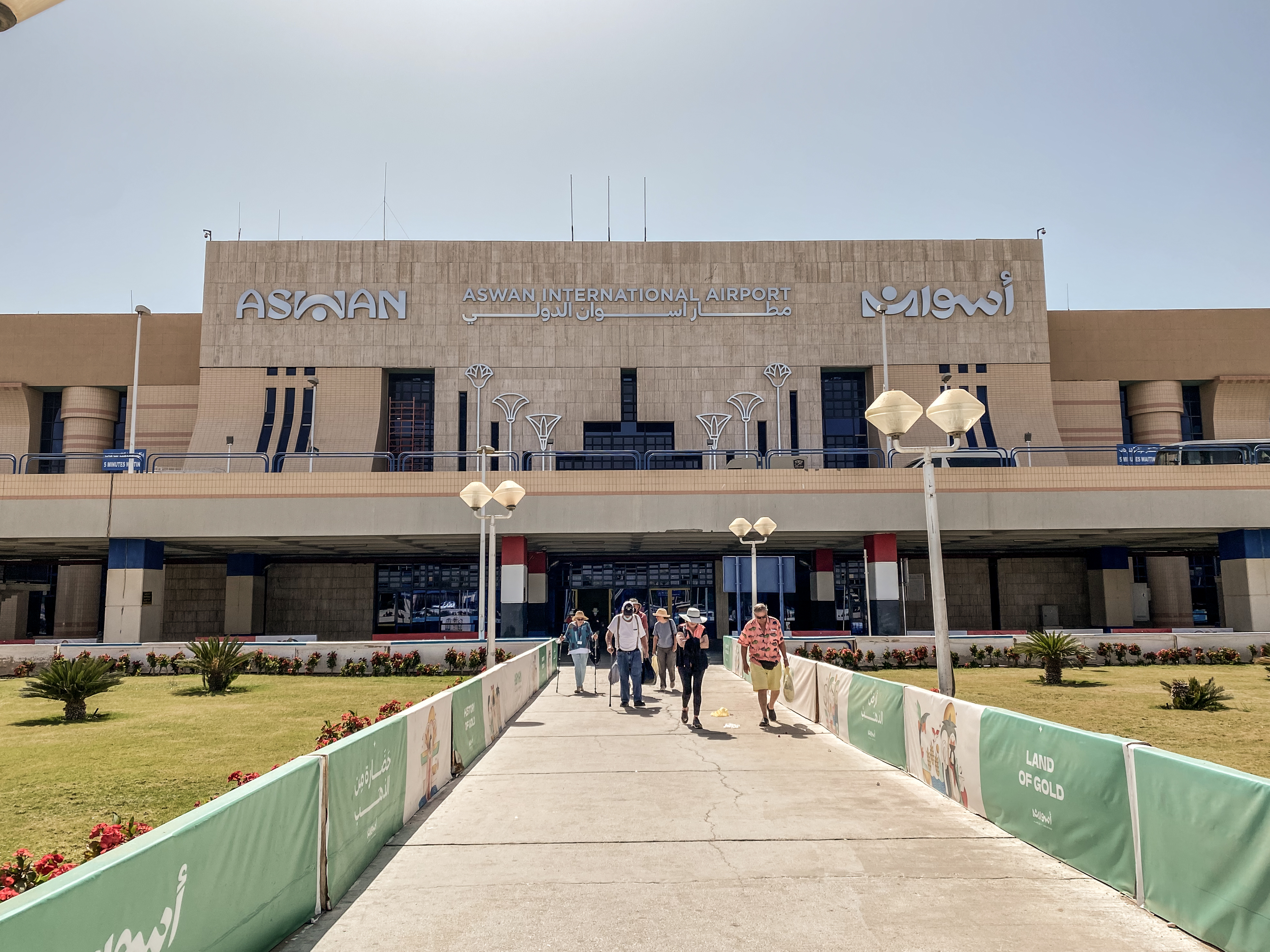
Aswan International Airport terminal 1 entrance

Located in Aswan, the airport is an international airport serving the southern region of Egypt, in addition to Abu Simbel Airport. It is around 10 km from the city and is part of the Aswan Air Base, began operating from 1960.

==== Rail ====
In 1898, construction began on the third railway line from Cairo to Luxor. The Qena-Aswan Railway Company extended the line to Aswan, the southernmost point of the railway network.

Aswan is linked to Cairo by the Cape to Cairo Railway, which also connects it with Wadi Halfa. The railway is incomplete towards the south. Other key transport infrastructures are the Port of Aswan, the largest river port in the region, and Aswan International Airport.

==== Road system, bus, taxi and water taxi ====
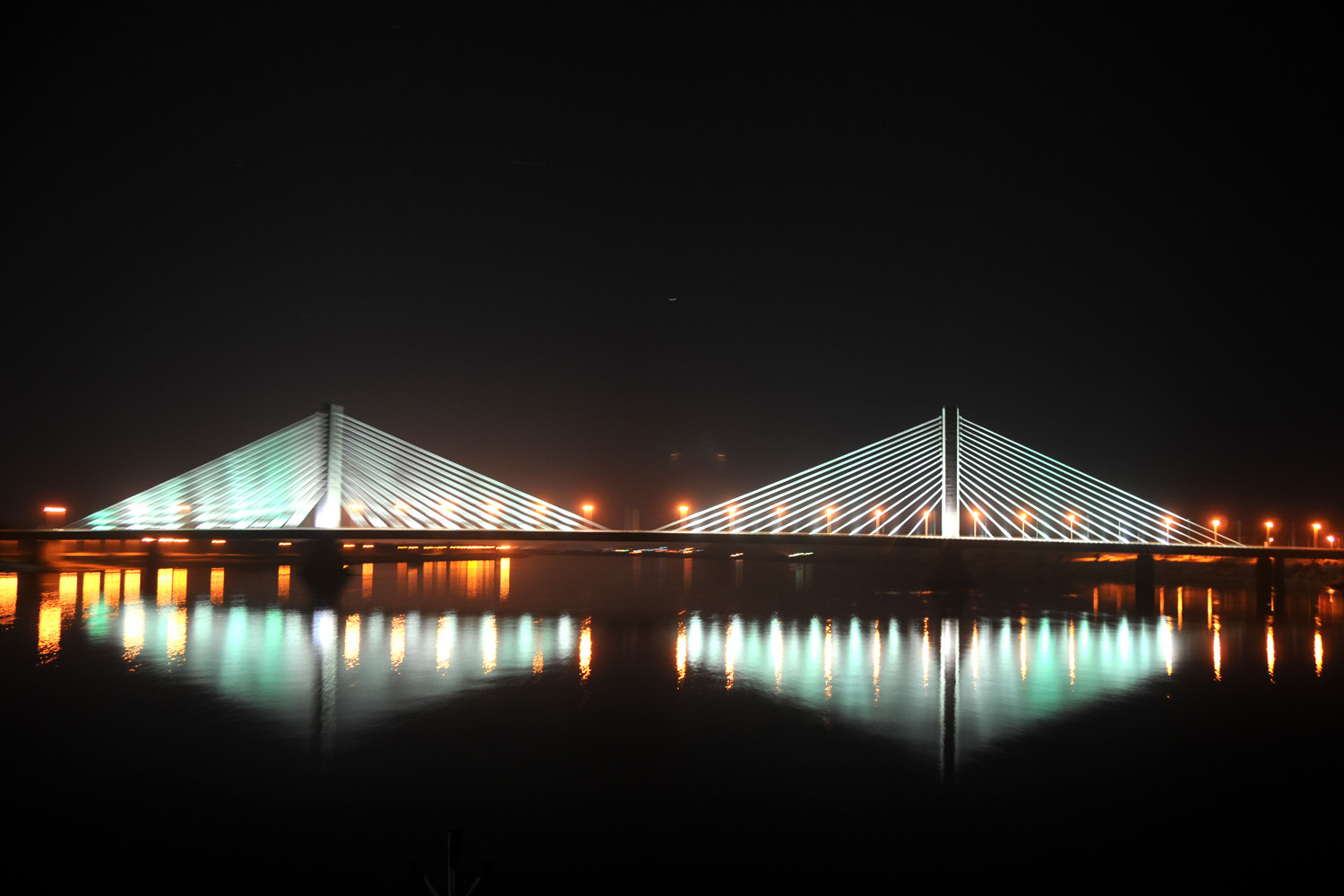
Aswan Bridge

The city is crossed by the Cape to Cairo Road, which connects it to Luxor and Cairo to the north, and Abu Simbel and Wadi Halfa to the south. Also important is the Aswan-Berenice highway, which connects with the ports of the Red Sea. The construction of the Aswan Bridge dates back to 1996, completed in 2002. The Aswan Dam Replacement Bridge aims to divert heavy traffic from the top of the dam, which, according to studies, can no longer withstand the increased loads passing over it. Also, an extensive road network connects Aswan with other Egyptian cities and villages. There is the new Kalabsha axis that surrounds the outskirts of the city, with exits that reach outer Aswan districts. Aswan is served by its white and blue taxis, run by individuals. These taxis cover the whole city. However water taxis are an important feature of transportation in Aswan as many destinations are in the Nile, as the city contains several islands.

== International relations ==
=== Twin towns – sister cities ===
Aswan is twinned with:

- Sonoma, California, United States
- Chongqing, China

== Notable people ==
- Al-Aswani, diplomat
- Idris Ali, author
- Abbas Mahmoud al-Aqqad, journalist and poet
- Yakan Hussein, footballer
- Al-Shater Bossely Abdul Jalil, historian
- Makram N. Kaiser, acarologist and parasitologist
- Khalil Kalfat, writer
- Ahmed Mostafa, footballer
- Mohamed Mounir, singer
- Ashraf Rabie, basketball player
- Omar Sharaf, diplomat
- Shikabala, footballer

== See also ==
- Wadi Allaqi national park
- Abu Simbel
- Aswan Dam
- Elephantine
- Philae
- Luxor
- El Nabatat Island
- Temple of Kalabsha
- Tombs of Nobles in Aswan
- Nubia
- Banu Kanz
- Coptic Diocese of Syene
- Ta-Seti
