= Aswan scorpion invasion =

2021 scorpion invasion in Aswan, Egypt

Egypt scorpions attack
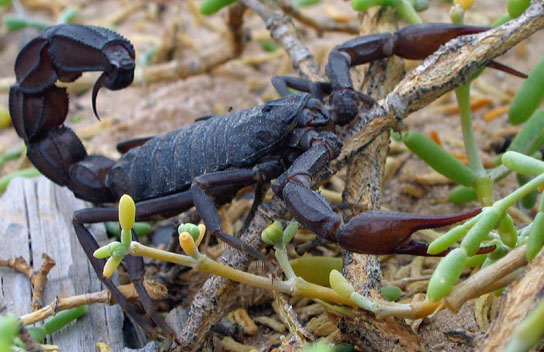
- Black scorpion
- Date: 12 November 2021
- Location: Aswan, Egypt
- Deaths: 3
- Injuries: 500+

The Aswan scorpion invasion came on 12 November 2021 in Egypt's Aswan region after flooding caused by heavy rains. More than 500 people were reported injured by stings.

The incident took place in the southern Egyptian city of Aswan. Heavy rains began to fall near the Nile River. Strong winds began to blow. Floodwater swept the Androctonus crassicauda scorpions out of their habitats and into remote areas. The scorpions injured more than 500. The incidents were at their peak on 11 and 12 November when large numbers of people rushed to hospitals.

Early news reports attributed three deaths to scorpion stings, but later reports stated the victims had been electrocuted from fallen wires.

According to Egyptian media, extra doses of anti-venom were delivered to nearby medical centers. The Health Department told people not to go near the desert, vegetation and trees and to stay home.
