= Coptic Diocese of Syene =

The Diocese of Syene is an ancient see of the Coptic Church in Aswan, Egypt. As its first bishop Neilammon was not mentioned as a new one in the Festal Letter of 339, it is assumed the diocese was established in the early 330s. Appion referred to himself as the "Bishop of the Legions of Syene, Contra Syene, and Elephantine," indicating an affiliation with the border guards at Aswan, but this may have been an error for "region."

The current bishop is Hedra, Metropolitan of Aswan (Syene and Elephantine) and Kom Ombo.

== Bishops of Syene ==
- Neilammon I, died 346
- Neilammon II, 346–356 (banished to the Siwa Oasis by Arian archbishop George of Cappadocia
- Unknown?
- Saint Hatre, c. 385–412 (Saint's Day: 12 Choiak)
- Unknown?
- Appion, 425–450
- Unknown?
- Valerius
- Ammonius, c. 460
- Macrinus
- Unknown?
- Iosephios, 5th or 6th century
- Hedra, 1975–2021
