= Tomb of Nefertari =

Ancient Egyptian tomb

QV66
- Burial site of Nefertari
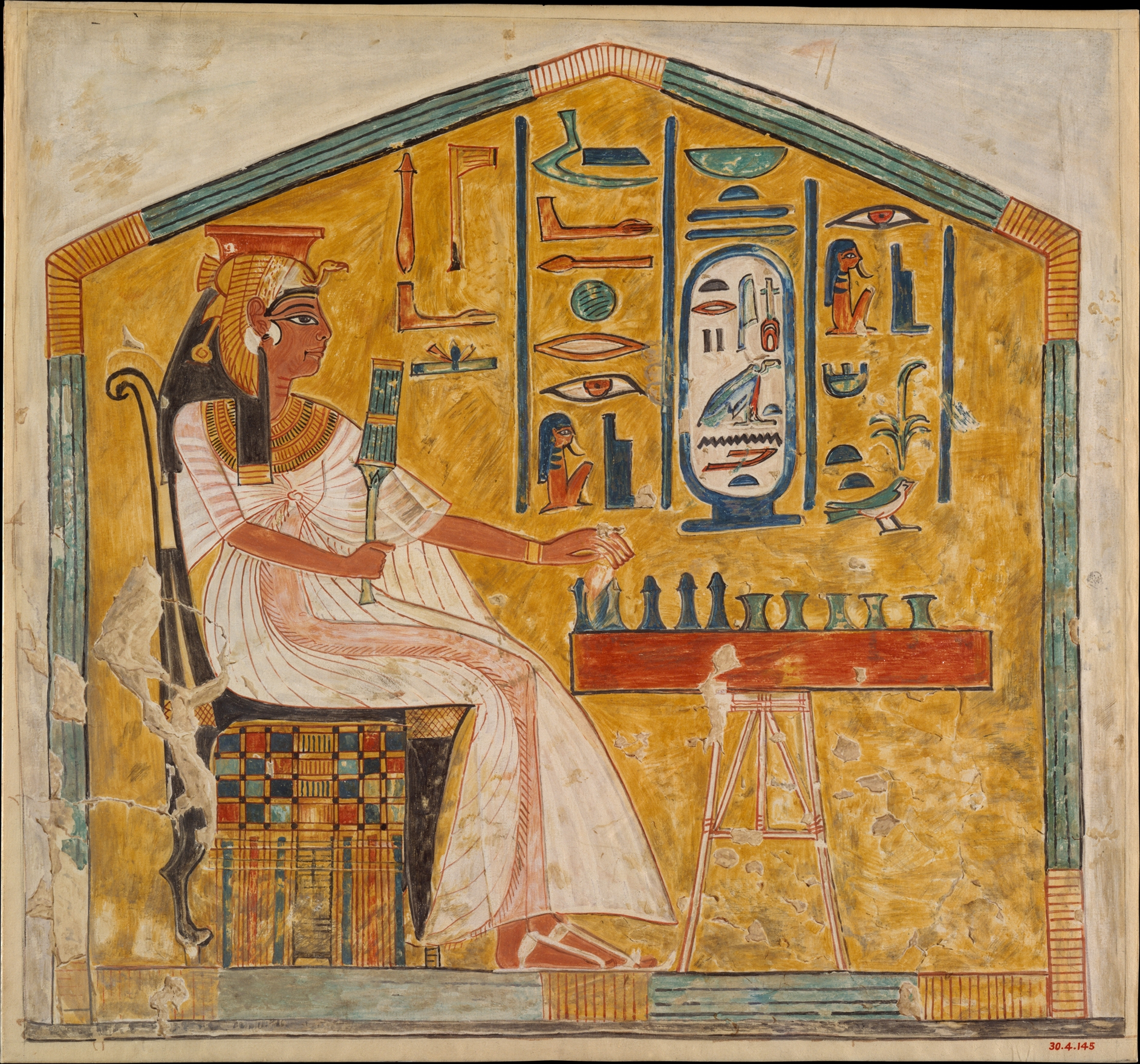
- Nefertari playing Senet

- Location within Egypt
- Coordinates: 25°43′40.3″N 32°35′33.4″E
- Location: Valley of the Queens
- Discovered: 1904
- Decoration: Book of the Dead
- Layout: Generally straight
- ← Previous; QV65 Next → QV67

QV66 is the tomb of Nefertari, the Great Wife of Pharaoh Ramesses II, in Egypt's Valley of the Queens. It was discovered by Ernesto Schiaparelli (the director of the Egyptian Museum in Turin) in 1904. Nefertari, which means "The most beautiful (one) among them", was Ramesses II's favorite wife; he went out of his way to make this obvious, referring to her as "the one for whom the sun shines" in his writings, built the Temple of Hathor at Abu Simbel to idolize her as a deity, and commissioned portraiture wall paintings. In the Valley of the Queens, Nefertari's tomb once held the mummified body and representative symbolisms of her, consistent with most Egyptian tombs of the period. Now, everything has been looted except for two thirds of the 5,200 square feet of wall paintings. For what still remains, these wall paintings characterized Nefertari's character. Her face received particular attention to emphasize her beauty, especially the shape of her eyes, the blush of her cheeks, and her eyebrows. Some paintings were full of lines and color of red, blue, yellow, and green that portrayed exquisite directions to navigating through the afterlife to paradise.

== Discovery of the tomb ==
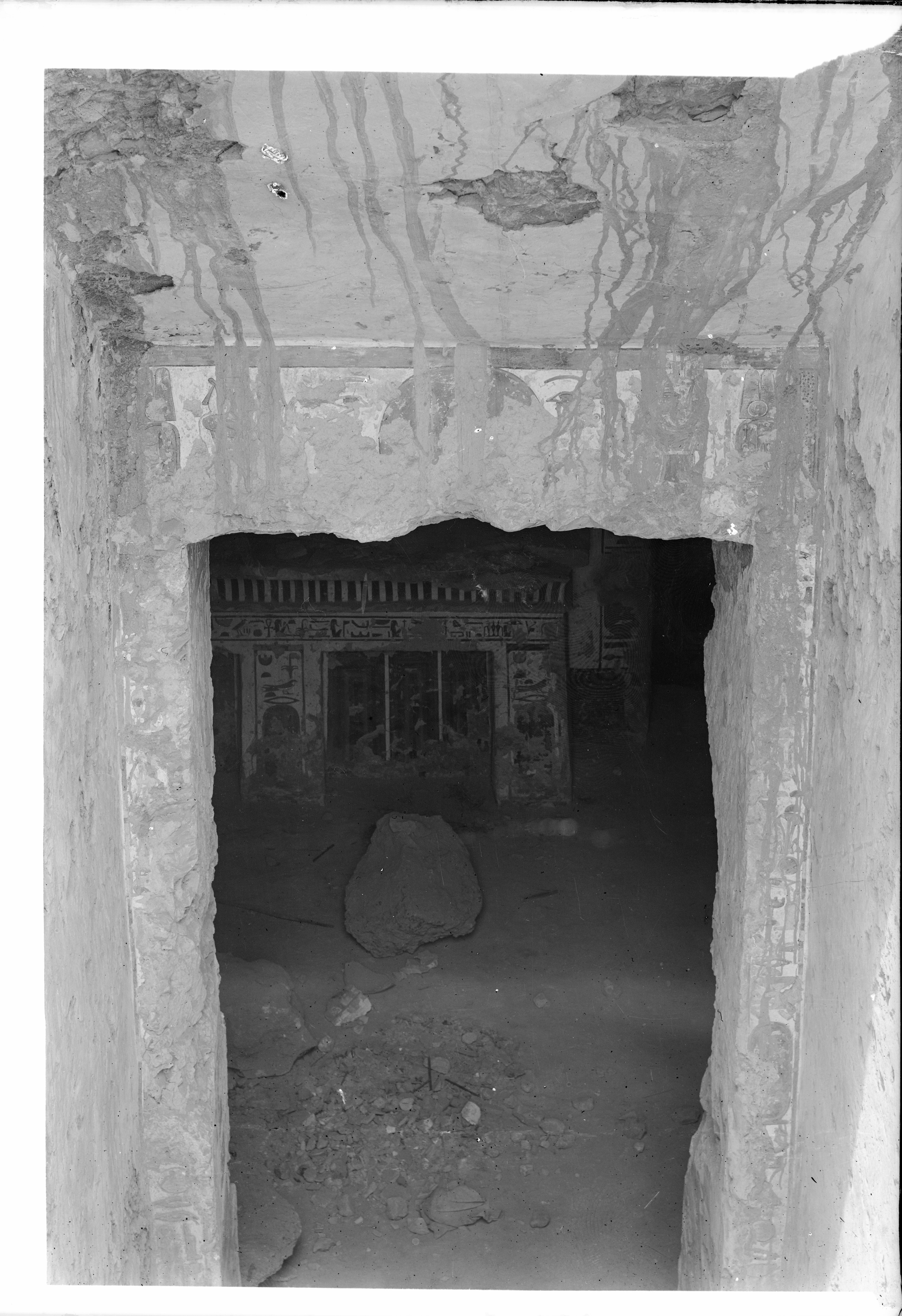
Entrance to the tomb at the time of its discovery, photographed from the descending steps, 1904. Photographic Archive, Museo Egizio, Turin.

The tomb was discovered in 1904 in the Valley of the Queens, at Thebes (west bank), by the Italian archaeologist Ernesto Schiaparelli, who was professor of Egyptology at the University of Turin and greatly expanded the collection of the Museo Egizio, where he served as director from 1884 to 1928.

In 1903 Schiaparelli obtained from the Egyptian authorities the exclusive concession to excavate in the Valley of the Queens; he was the first Egyptologist to conduct investigations at the site with a systematic method in three successive campaigns, assisted by his capable collaborator Francesco Ballerini.

During the second campaign, while Schiaparelli was carrying out surveys to the north of the main wadi in the area, where other tombs had already been found, the workmen uncovered the first steps of a staircase that they considered a sure sign of a tomb. After removing the masses of debris covering the steps, they quickly brought to light a staircase cut into the rock between two whitewashed walls, with in the middle the characteristic descending ramp that was necessary to move and lower the sarcophagus. The staircase, 1.65 m wide, descended for eight metres to a large wall with a doorway; on the door jambs the queen's name was written. The tomb, however, was found open, with no trace of the original sealing, and much rubble had fallen as far as the first hall. The other rooms were found empty, and it was clear that the tomb had been looted, perhaps already in antiquity. Of the pink granite sarcophagus only a few pieces were recovered, including several fragments of the lid. Of the grave goods, which must originally have been numerous, only about thirty ushabti figures, some parts of three pottery vessels and others in alabaster, and some fragments of funerary caskets and furniture were found.

Schiaparelli recovered only part of the mummy—the legs—together with numerous very fine linen wrappings used to bind the body, and the sandals, made of palm fibre, worn by the queen. In a niche at the back of the sarcophagus chamber, behind a stone slab, there was an amulet depicting the djed, protector of the tomb.

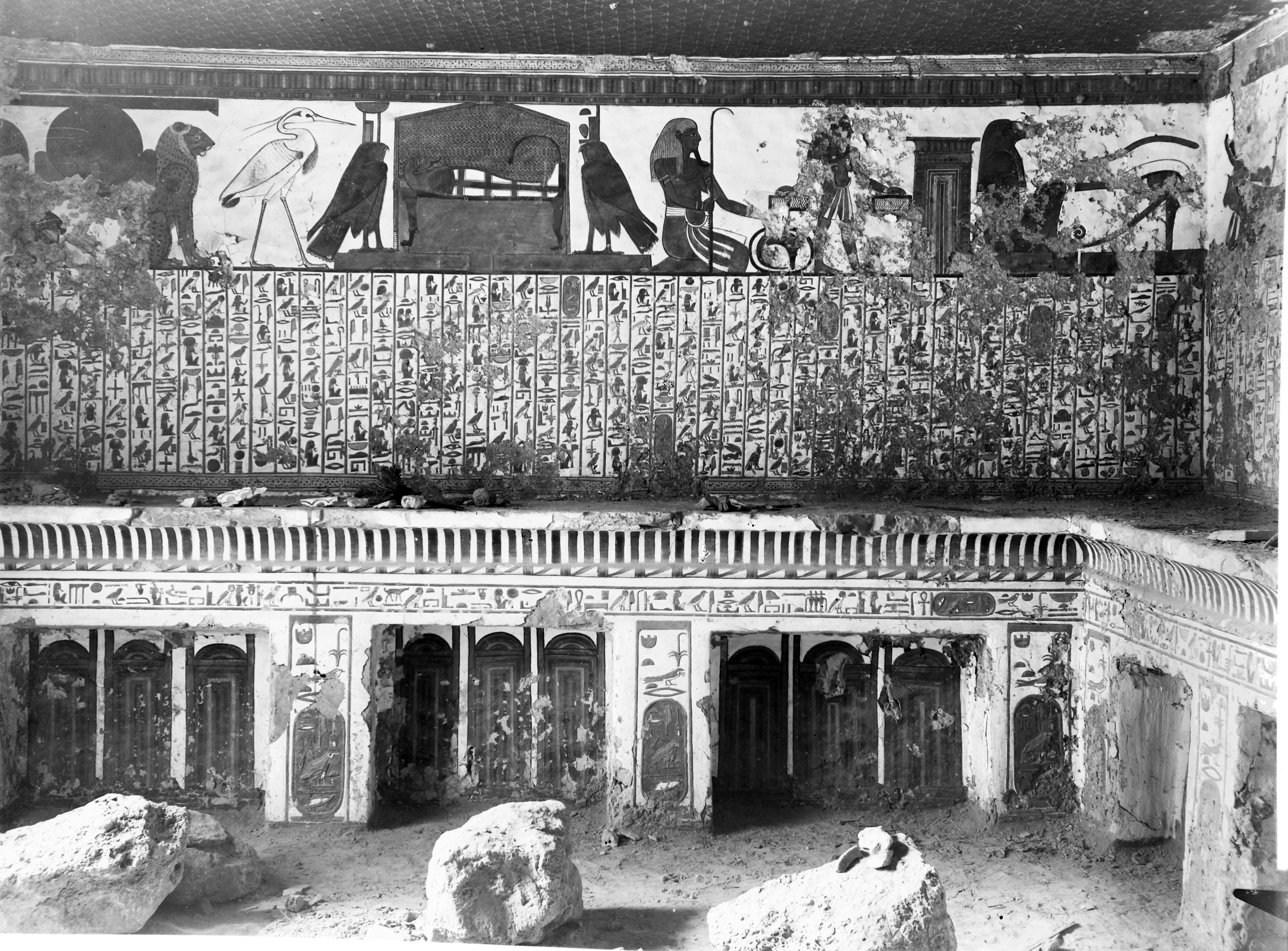
View of the antechamber at the time of its discovery. West wall, scene 3. In the upper register are Atum between two lions, the bird Bennu, a mummy on a bed between two falcons, and representations of Nephthys and Isis. These are depictions connected with the central register, which features chap. 17 of the Book of the Dead. Below, on the left, is a decoration composed of djed pillars and tyet knots, while in the centre there is a ledge with an Egyptian cavetto cornice, with representations of shrines.

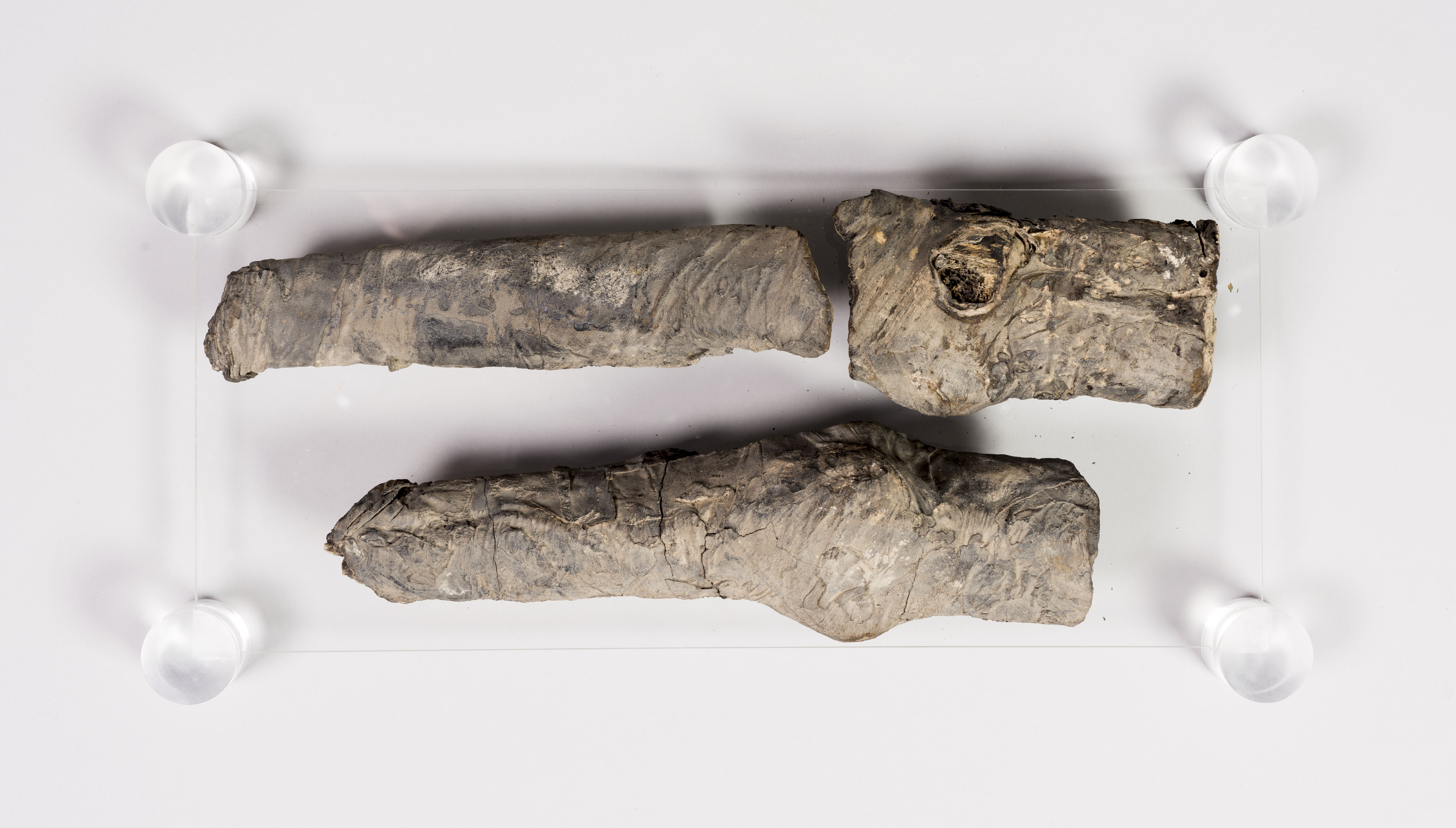
Legs of the mummy of Nefertari. Museo Egizio, Turin (S.5154).

== Decoration and layout ==
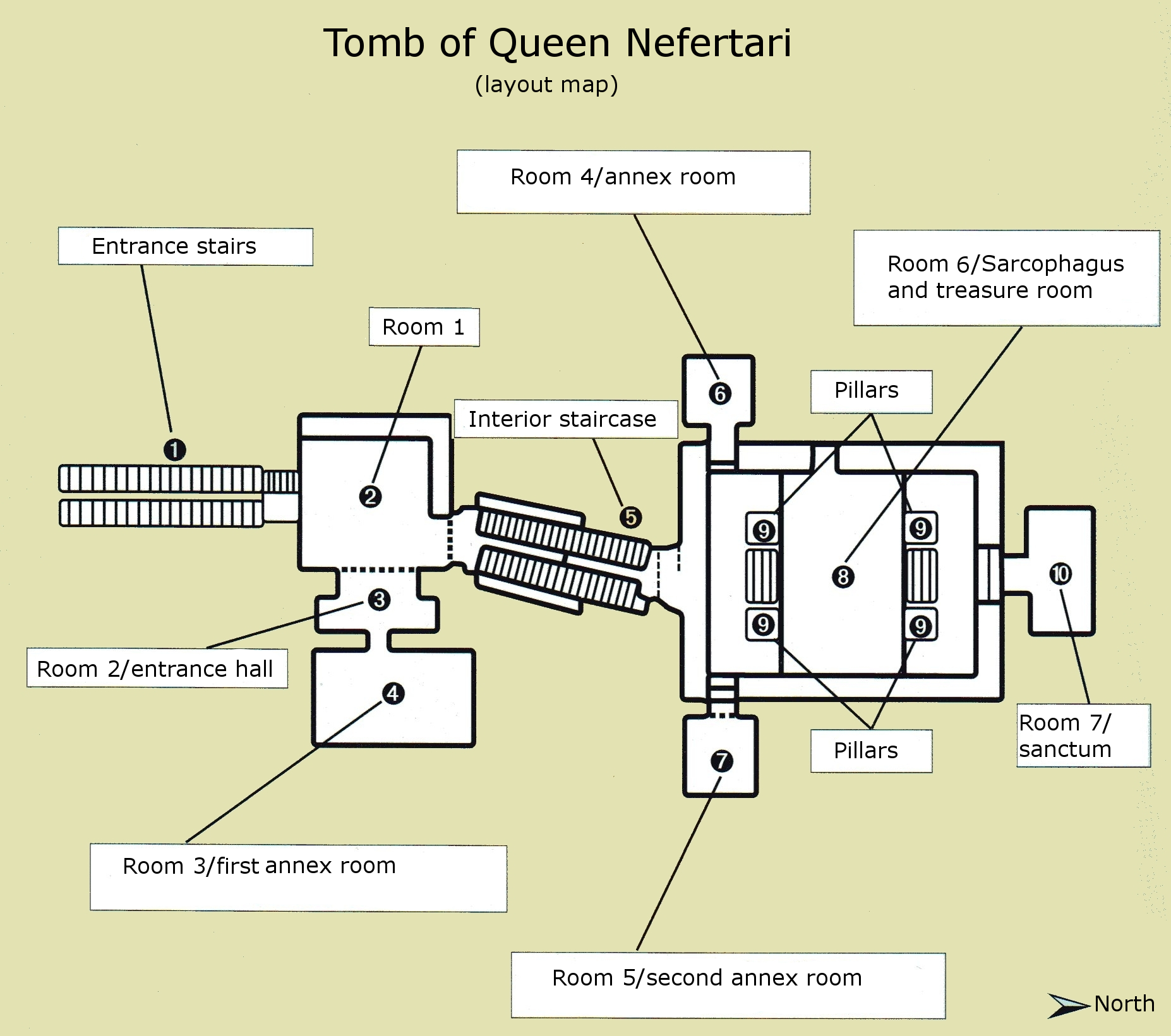
Map of QV66's layout

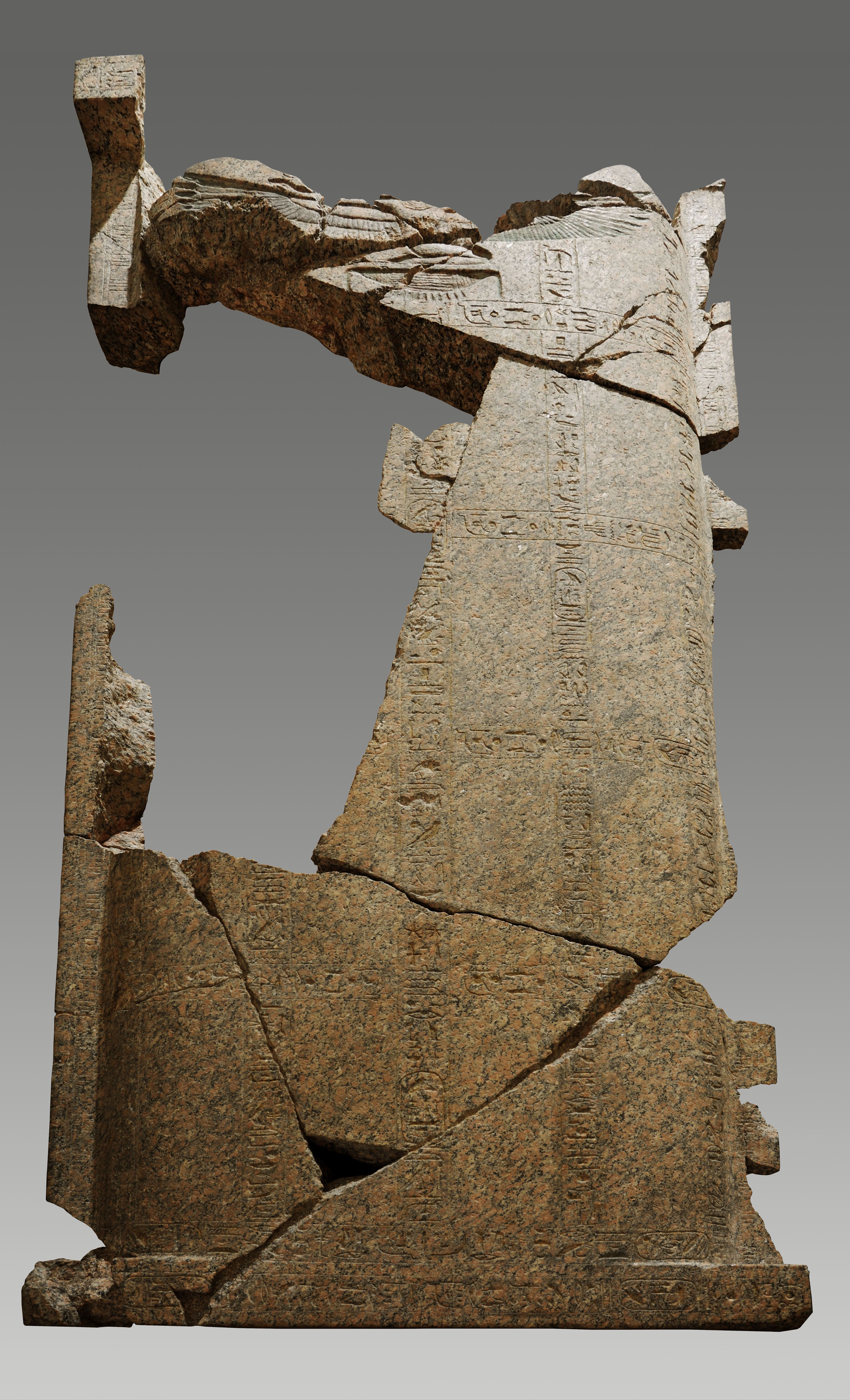
Fragmentary lid of the sarcophagus of queen Nefertari, granite. Museo Egizio, Turin.

A flight of steps cut out of the rock gives access to the antechamber, which is decorated with paintings based on Chapter 17 of the Book of the Dead. This astronomical ceiling represents the heavens and is painted in dark blue, with a myriad of golden five-pointed stars. The east wall of the antechamber is interrupted by a large opening flanked by representation of Osiris at left and Anubis at right; this in turn leads to the side chamber, decorated with offering scenes, preceded by a vestibule in which the paintings portray Nefertari being presented to the gods who welcome her. On the north wall of the antechamber is the stairway that goes down to the burial chamber. This latter is a vast quadrangular room covering a surface area about 90 square meters, the astronomical ceiling of which is supported by four pillars entirely covered with decoration. Originally, the queen's red granite sarcophagus lay in the middle of this chamber. According to religious doctrines of the time, it was in this chamber, which the ancient Egyptians called the "golden hall" that the regeneration of the deceased took place. This decorative pictogram of the walls in the burial chamber drew inspirations from chapters 144 and 146 of the Book of the Dead: in the left half of the chamber, there are passages from chapter 144 concerning the gates and doors of the kingdom of Osiris, their guardians, and the magic formulas that had to be uttered by the deceased in order to go past the doors.

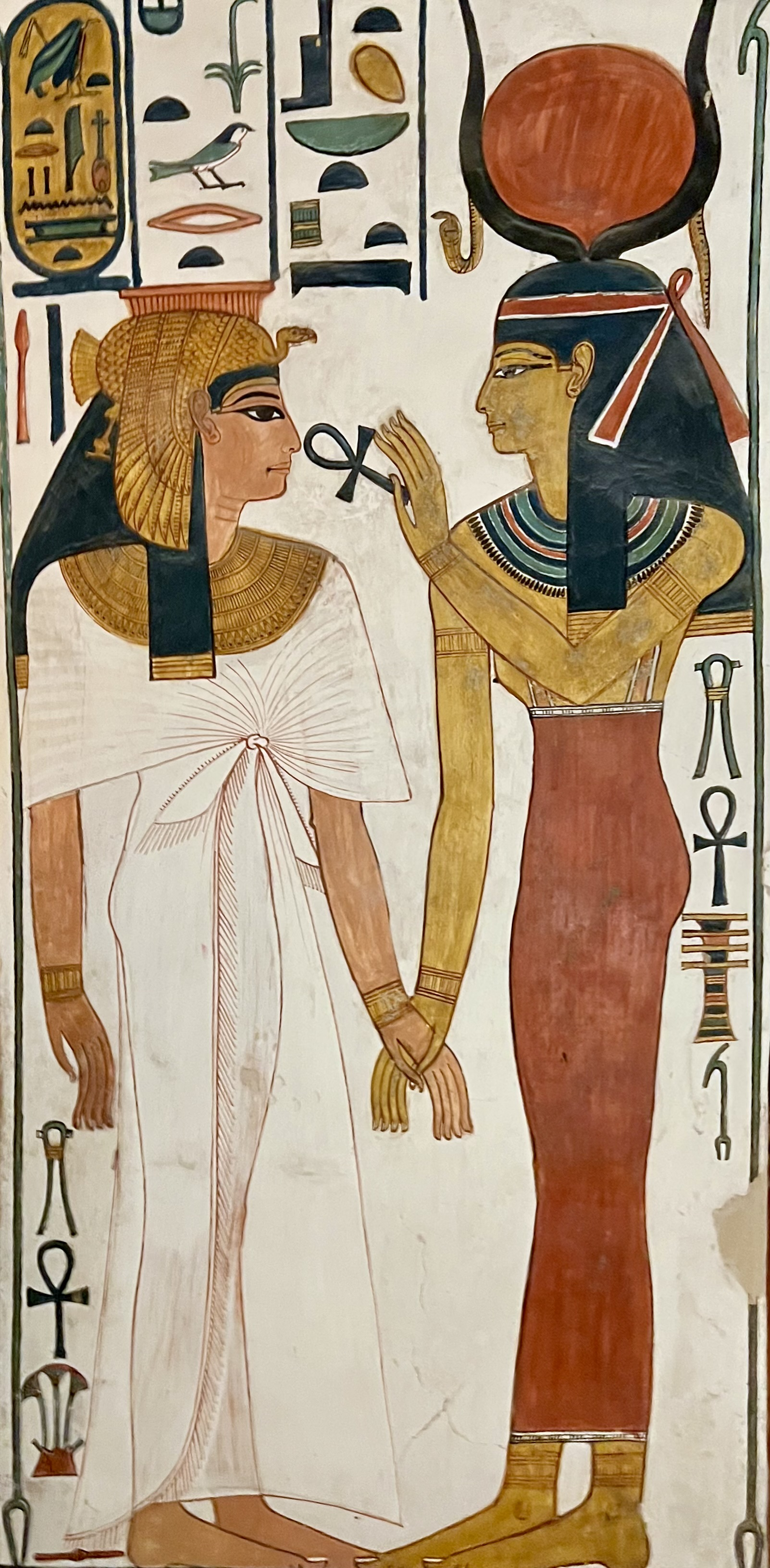
Nefertari depicted with the goddess Hathor

The tomb itself is primarily focused on the Queen's life and on her death. Of the wall full of paintings, the "Queen playing Draughts" is a portrayal of Nefertari playing the game of Senet. A whole entire wall was dedicated to show the Queen at play, demonstrating the importance of the game of Senet. Interpretations suggest that a physical board game of Senet may have possibly been stolen, along with the body and other symbolic images of Nefertari. Nefertari may have been very clever, and possibly have been a writer in her lifetime. ^4 This can be alluded because of a painting in the tomb of Nefertari coming before the god of writing and literacy, Thoth, to proclaim her title as a scribe. Nefertari lived an elegant life on earth, and she is also promised an elegant afterlife. Chapter 17 of the Book of the Dead, which tells a spell for the Queen, is inscribed on the tomb. This spell is supposed to guide Nefertari on how to transform into a ba, which is a bird. For Nefertari to become a bird in the afterlife holds a promise of freedom to move around.

By contemporary standards, the real value of the paintings found within the tomb is that they are the best preserved and most detailed source of the ancient Egyptian's journey towards the afterlife. The tomb features several extracts from the Book of the Dead from chapters 148, 94, 146, 17 and 144 and tells of all the ceremonies and tests taking place from the death of Nefertari up until the end of her journey, depicted on the door of her burial chamber, in which Nefertari is reborn and emerges from the eastern horizon as a sun disc, forever immortalized in victory over the world of darkness.

The details of the ceremonies concerning the afterlife also tell us much about the duties and roles of many major and minor gods during the reign of the 19th Dynasty in the New Kingdom. Gods mentioned on the tomb walls include Isis, Osiris, Anubis, Hathor, Neith, Serket, Ma'at, Wadjet, Nekhbet, Amunet, Ra, Nephthys, Khepri, Amun, and Horus. By the time that Schiaparelli rediscovered Nefertari's tomb it had already been found by tomb raiders, who had stolen all the treasure buried with the Queen, including her sarcophagus trough and mummy. Parts of the mummy's knees were found in the burial chamber, and were taken to the Egyptian Museum in Turin by Schiaparelli, where they are still kept today.

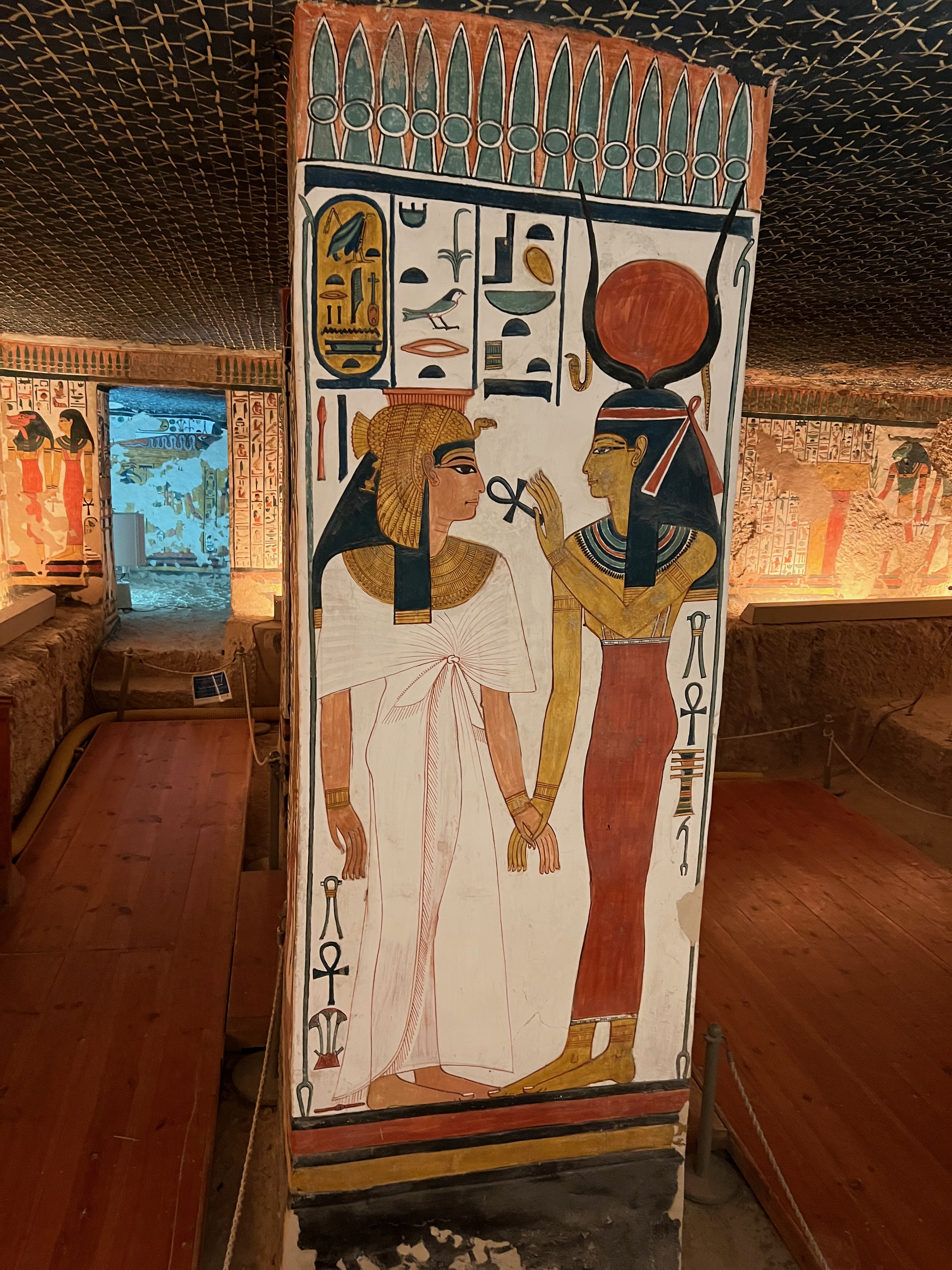
Inside the tomb of Nefertari where she stands with Hathor

== Closure ==
The tomb was closed to the public in 1950 because of various problems that threatened the paintings, which are considered to be the best preserved and most eloquent decorations of any Egyptian burial site. Closure of the tomb was due to large areas of paint and plaster strata deteriorating from the walls, and paint flaking remained an issue, even when the tomb was closed to the public. The paintings are found on almost every available surface in the tomb, including thousands of stars painted on the ceiling of the burial chamber on a blue background to represent the sky.

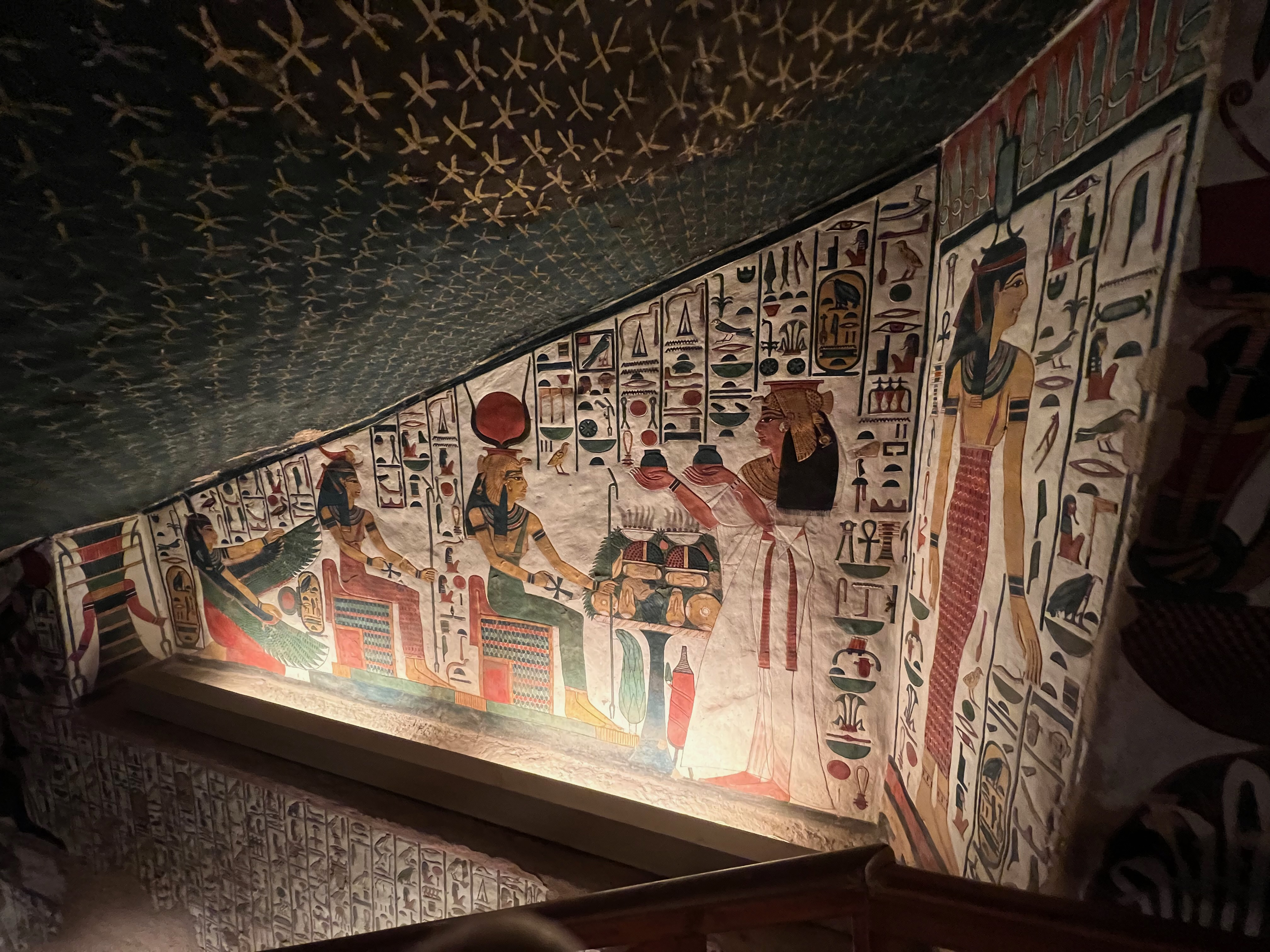
Nefertari shown offering to the goddesses Maat, Serket, and Hathor

After the discovery of the tomb, scientists found deterioration in many paintings caused by water damage, bacterial growth, salt formation, and recently, the humidity of visitors' breath. There are two factors that damaged the tomb at a rapid rate: capillary absorption of trapped flood-waters into the tomb's walls and direct entry of flood-waters. Flood-water causes immediate damage to the tomb, while absorbed waters cause morphological changes that contribute to the deterioration of paint and plaster. In 1986, an operation to restore all the paintings within the tomb and to replace over 3,000 years worth of dust and soot with paper pasted to the fragile walls and ceilings to preserve the paintings was embarked upon by the Egyptian Antiquities Organisation and the Getty Conservation Institute; the actual restoration work began in 1988 and was completed in April 1992. Upon completion of the restoration work, Egyptian authorities decided to severely restrict public access to the tomb in order to preserve the delicate paintings found within. Five years later, Egypt's Prime Minister, Hisham Zazao, declared the tomb to be reopened to visitors, 150 visitors at a time. In 2006, the tomb was restricted to visitors once again, except for private tours of a maximum of 20 people purchasing a license for US$3000.

As of December 2023, holders of a 2000 EGP entry ticket or a premium Luxor pass can visit this tomb. To this day, the Getty Conservation Institute regularly monitors the tomb. The tomb was closed from 5 March 2024 until 27 October 2024 for urgent renovations.

== Gallery ==
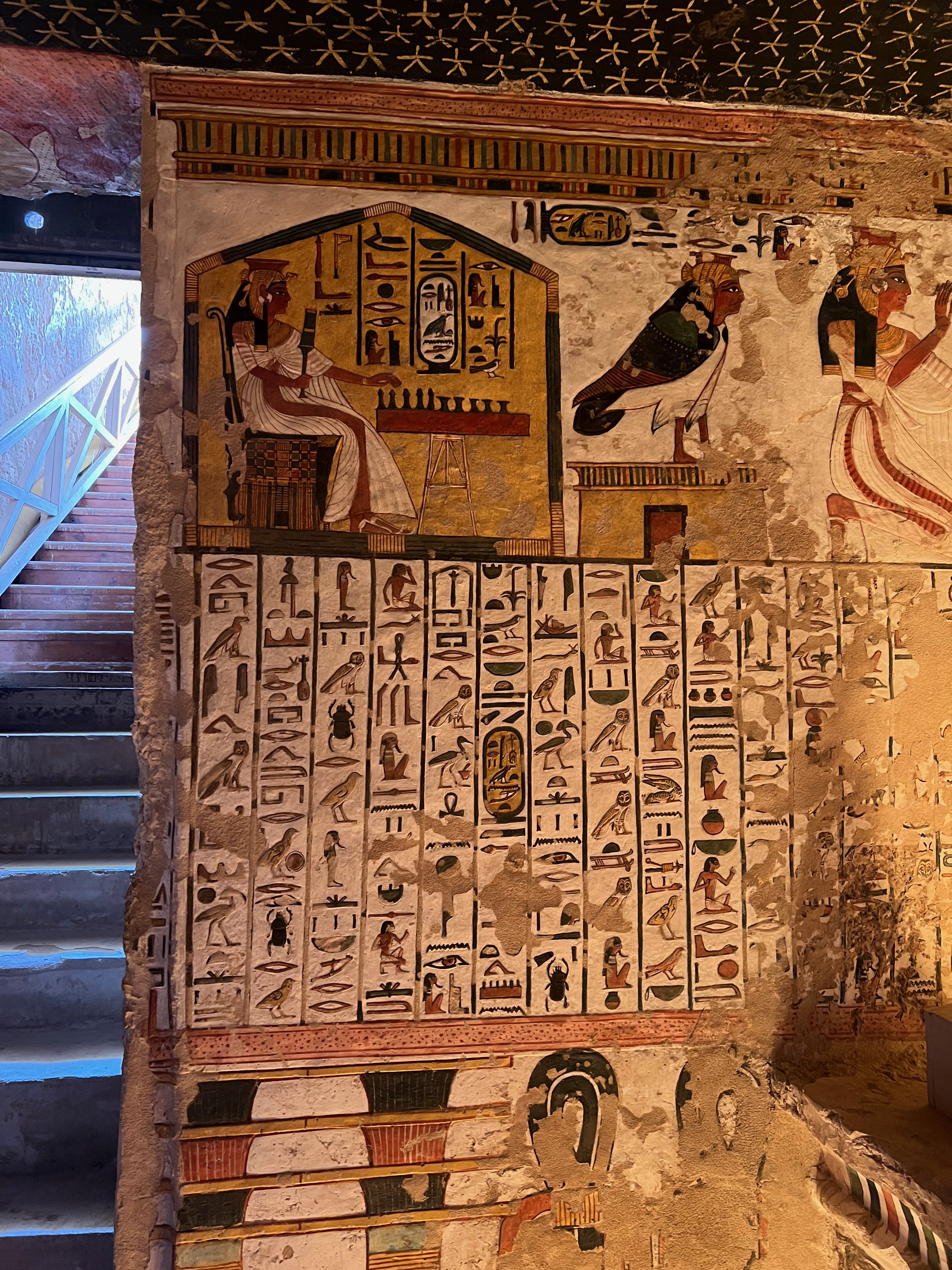
Nefertari in a kiosk playing senet (left), Nefertari as a ba (center), Nefertari kneeling in prayer (right), room 1

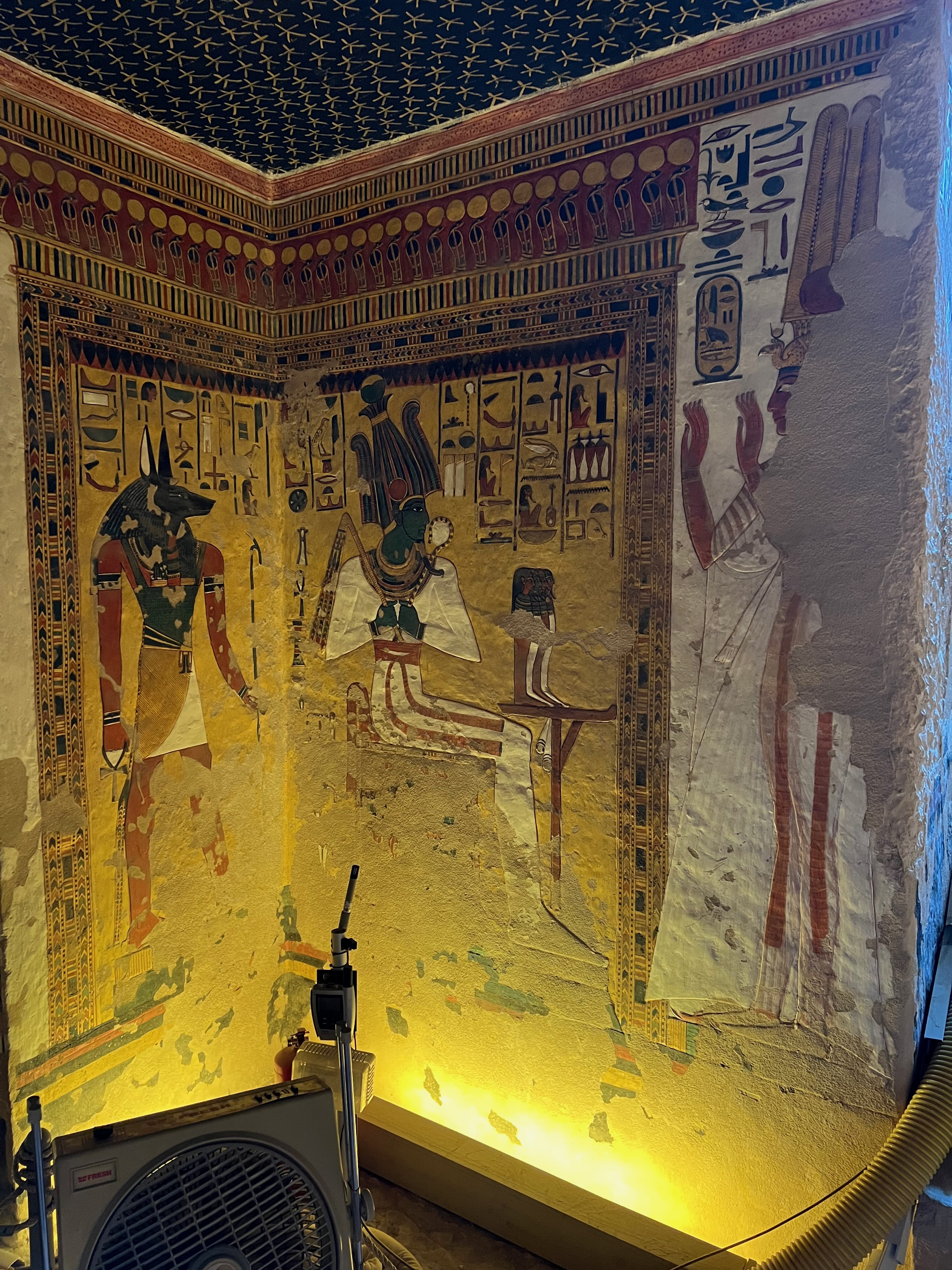
Anubis and Osiris depicted in a kiosk being praised by Nefertari, room 1

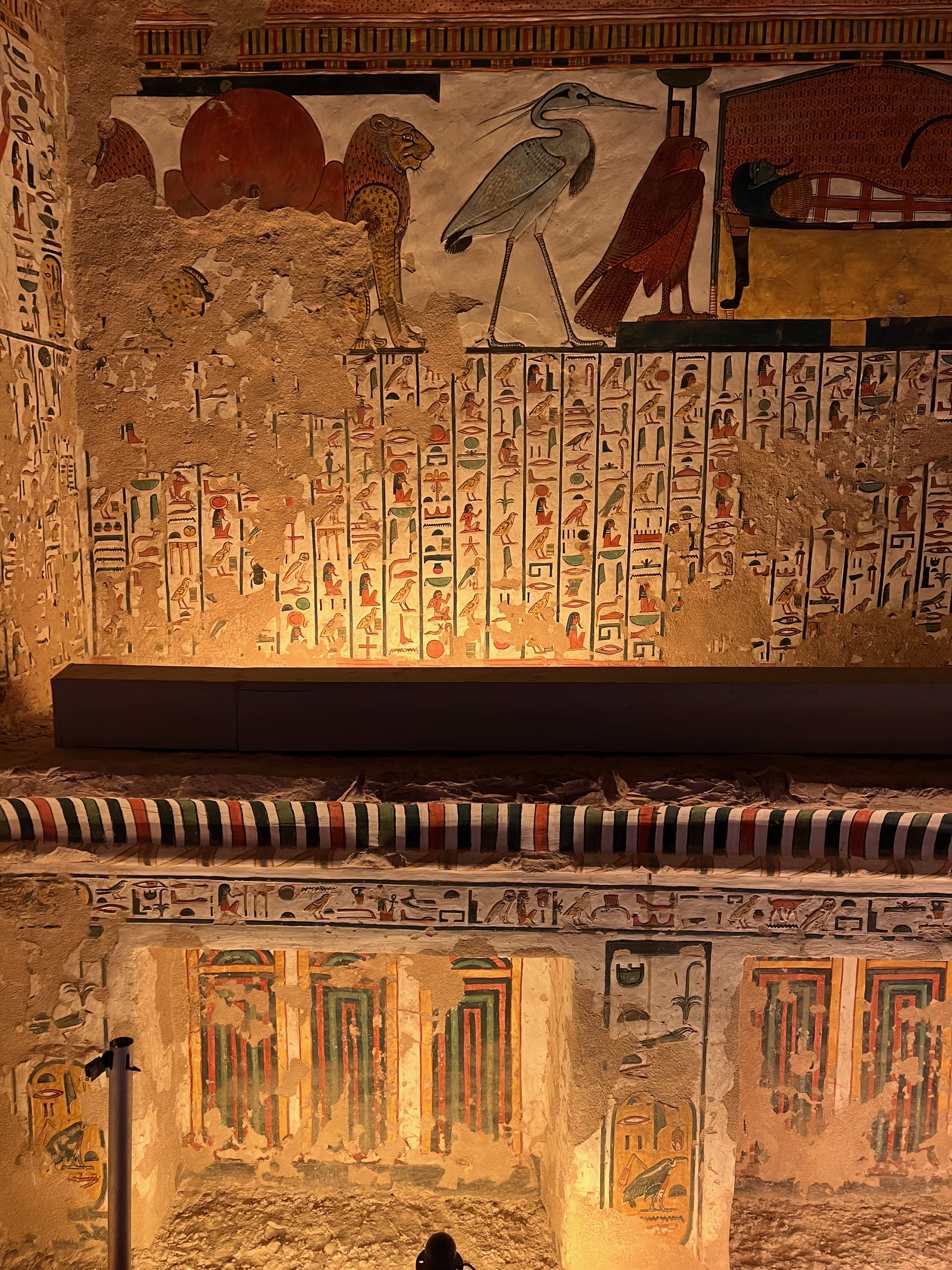
The god Aker (left), the Bennu bird (center), Nephthys in the form of a kite before the mummy of Osiris (right)

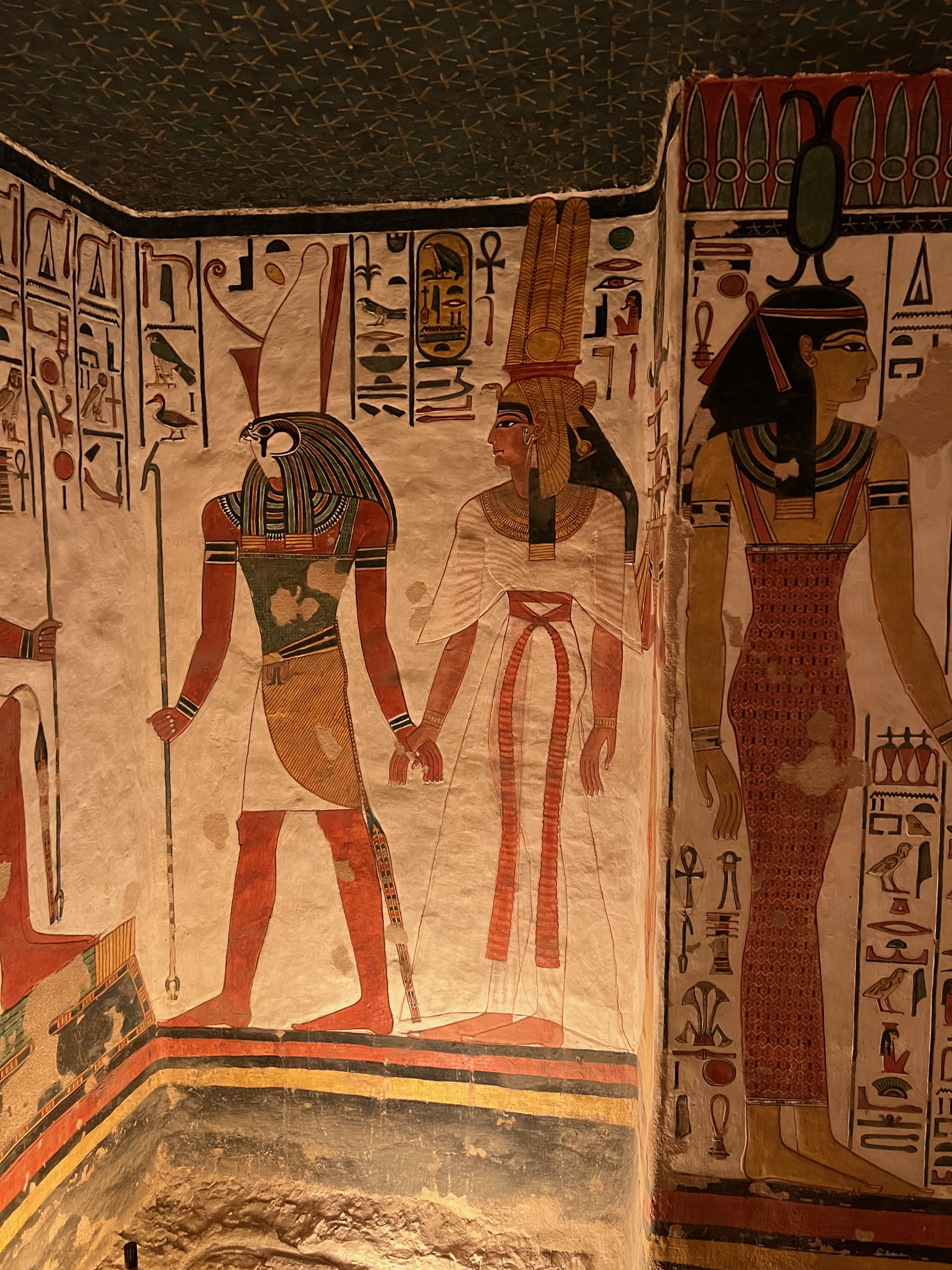
Horus leading Nefertari by the hand, entrance hall

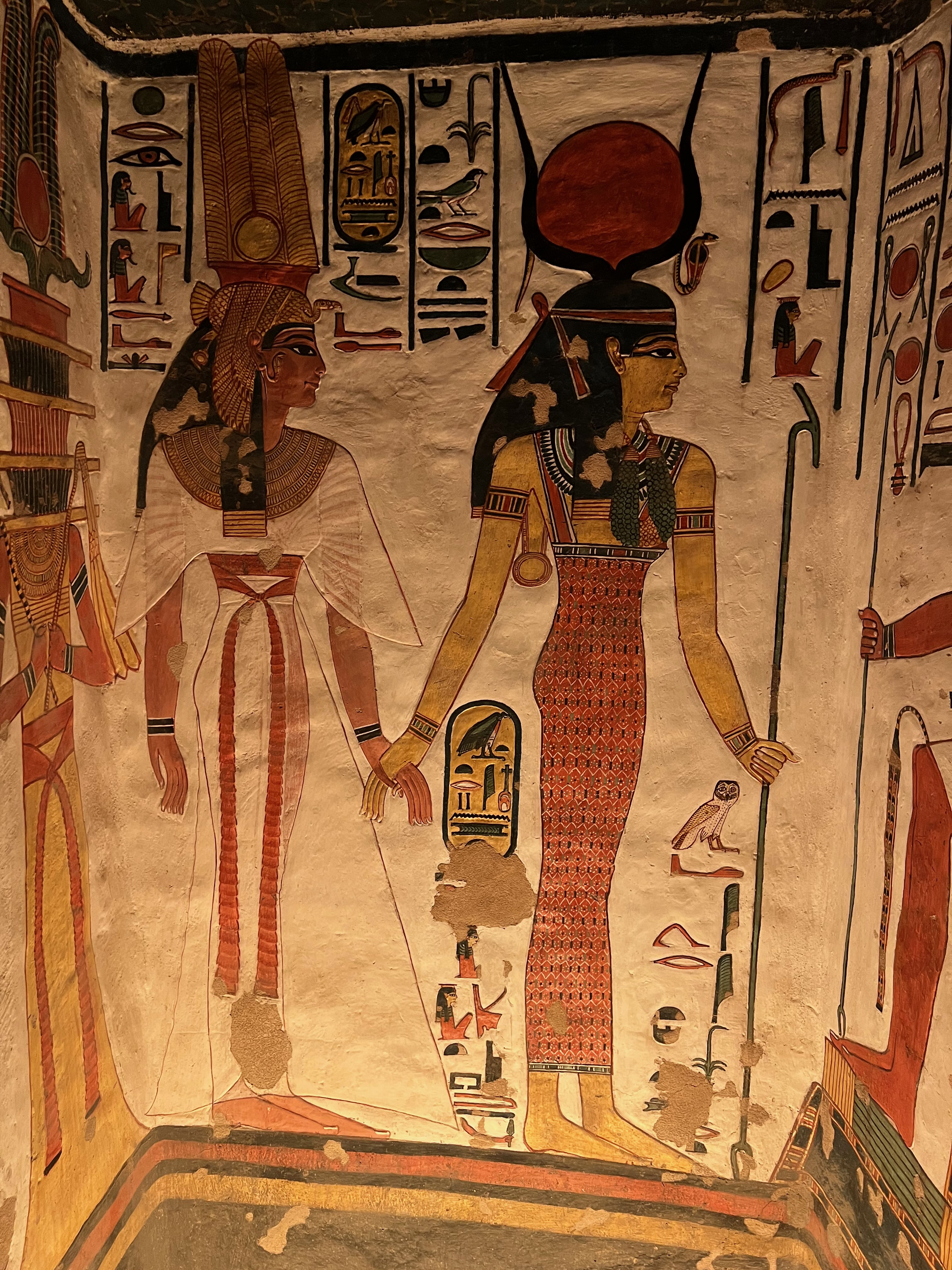
Nefertari being led by hand by Hathor, entrance hall

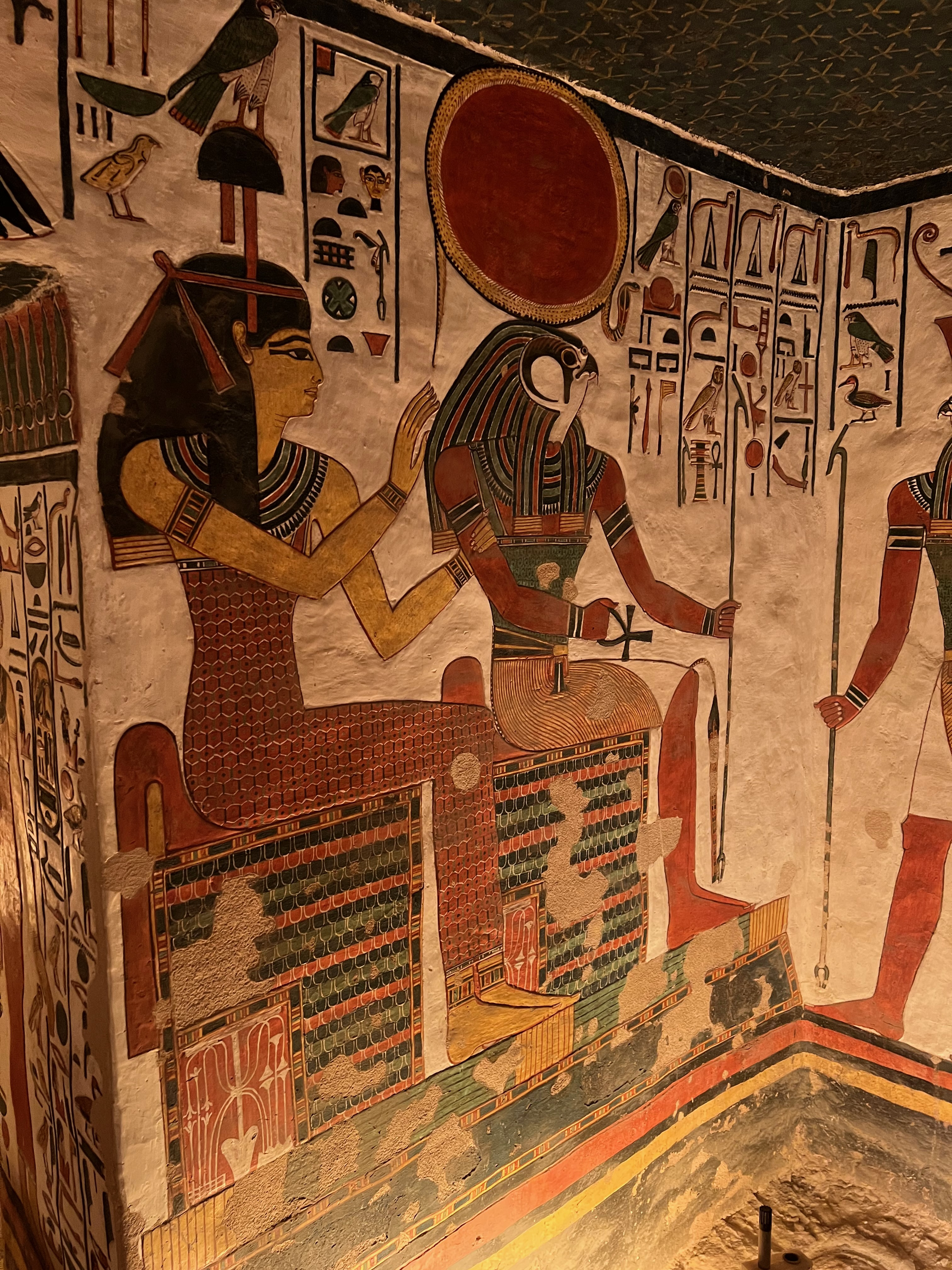
Imentet enthroned with Ra, entrance hall

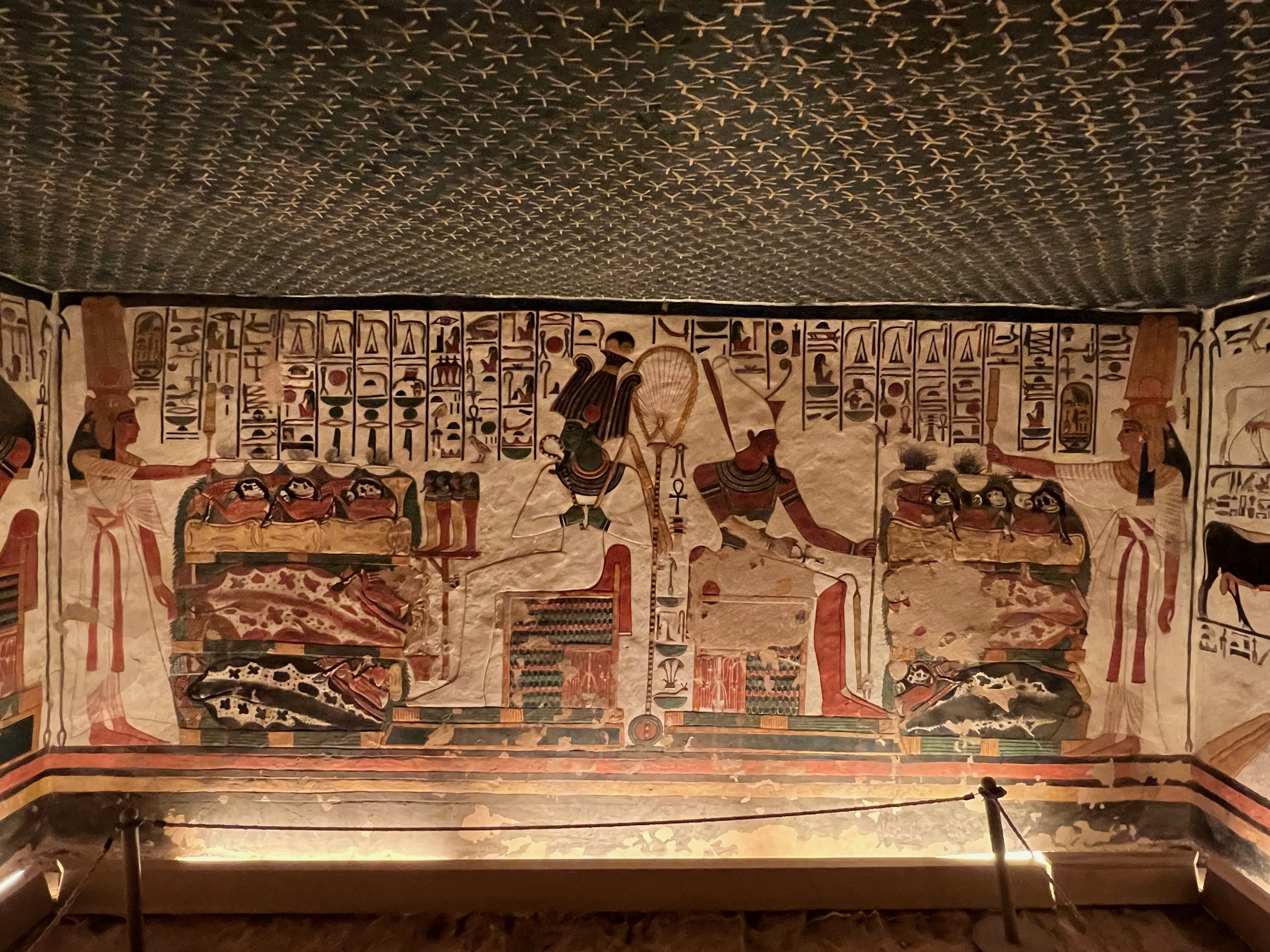
Osiris (left) and Atum (right) shown enthroned, receiving offerings from Nefertari, upper annex room

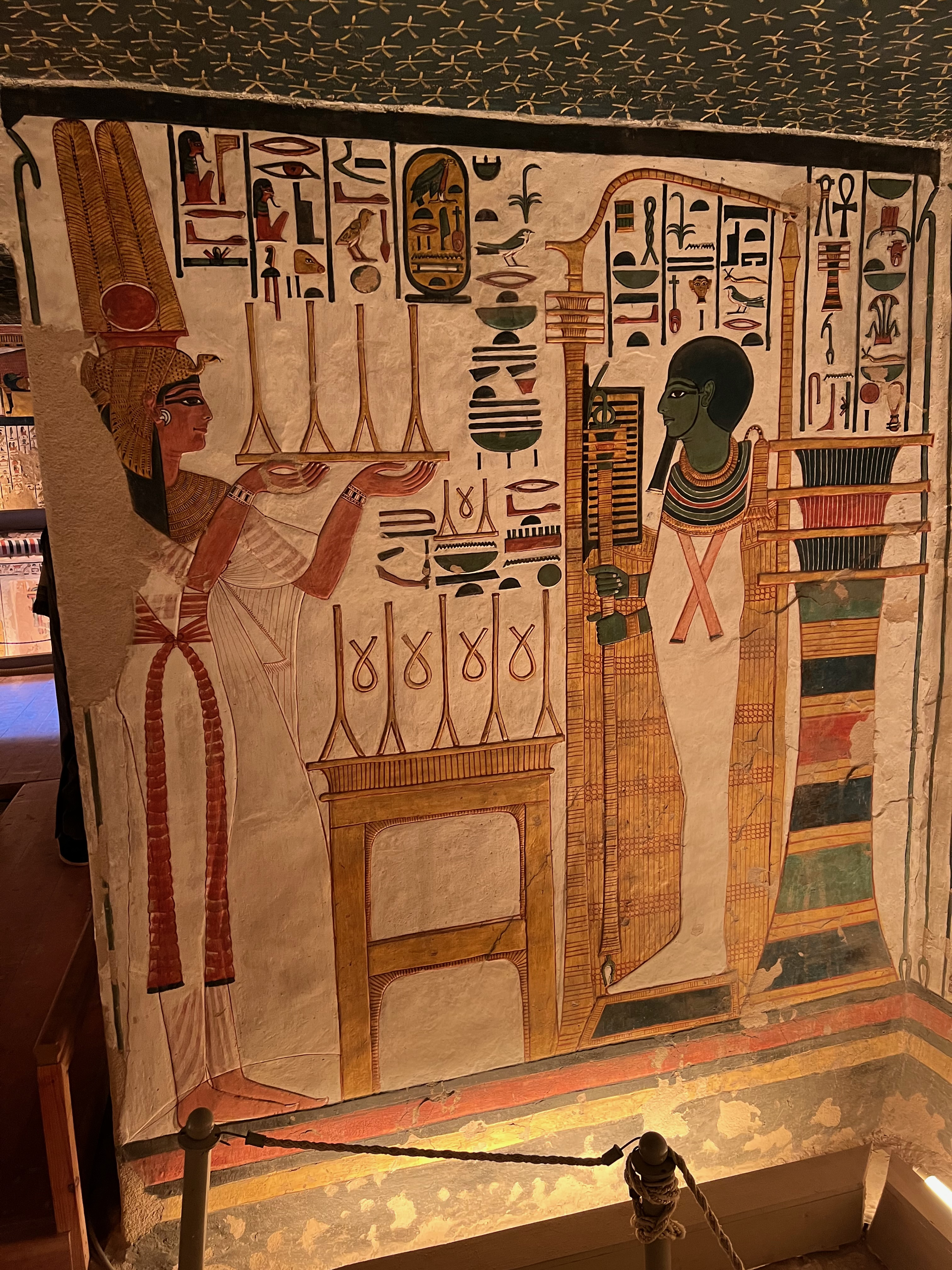
Nefertari offering to Ptah, upper annex room

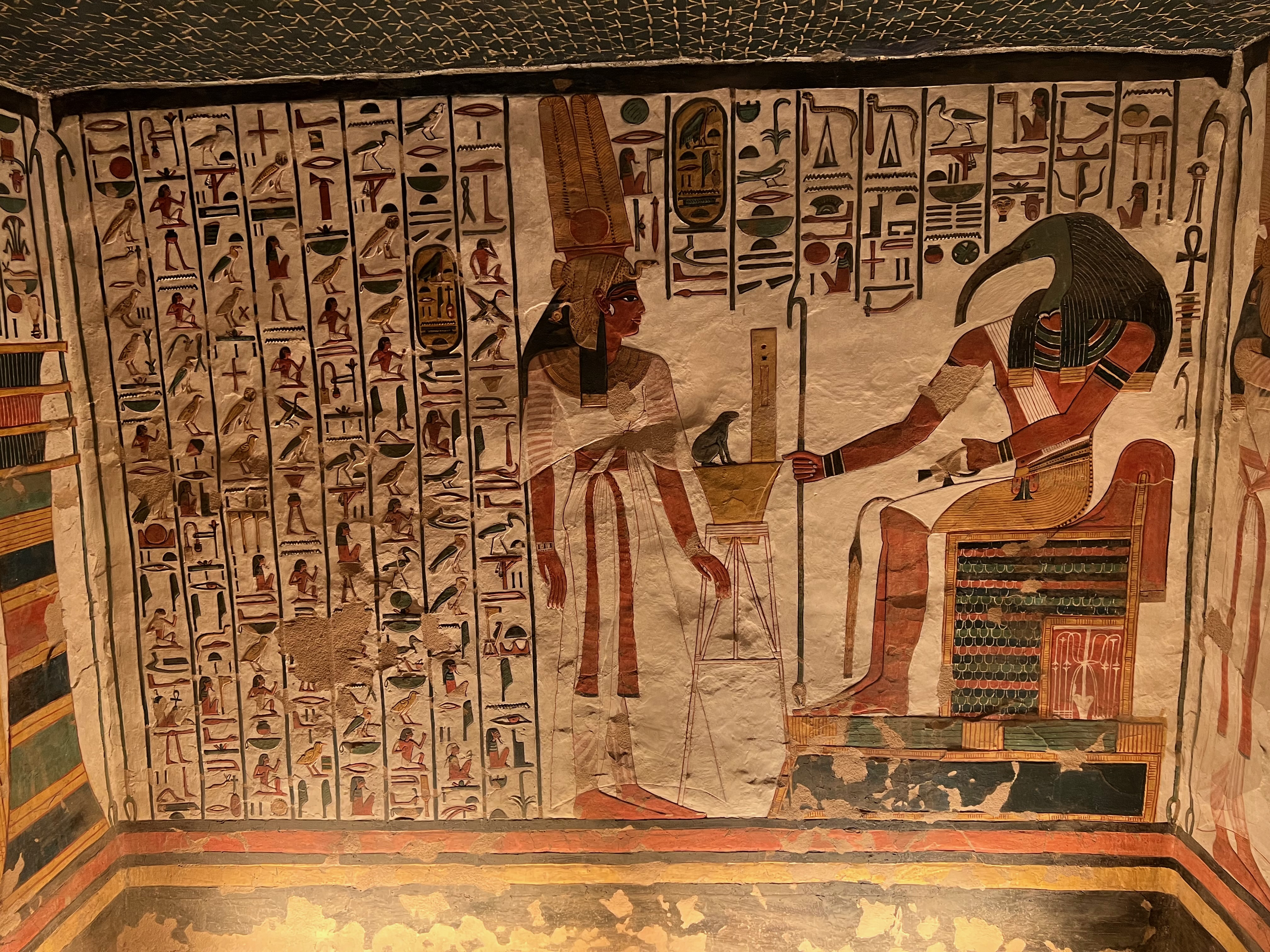
Nefertari before Thoth, upper annex room

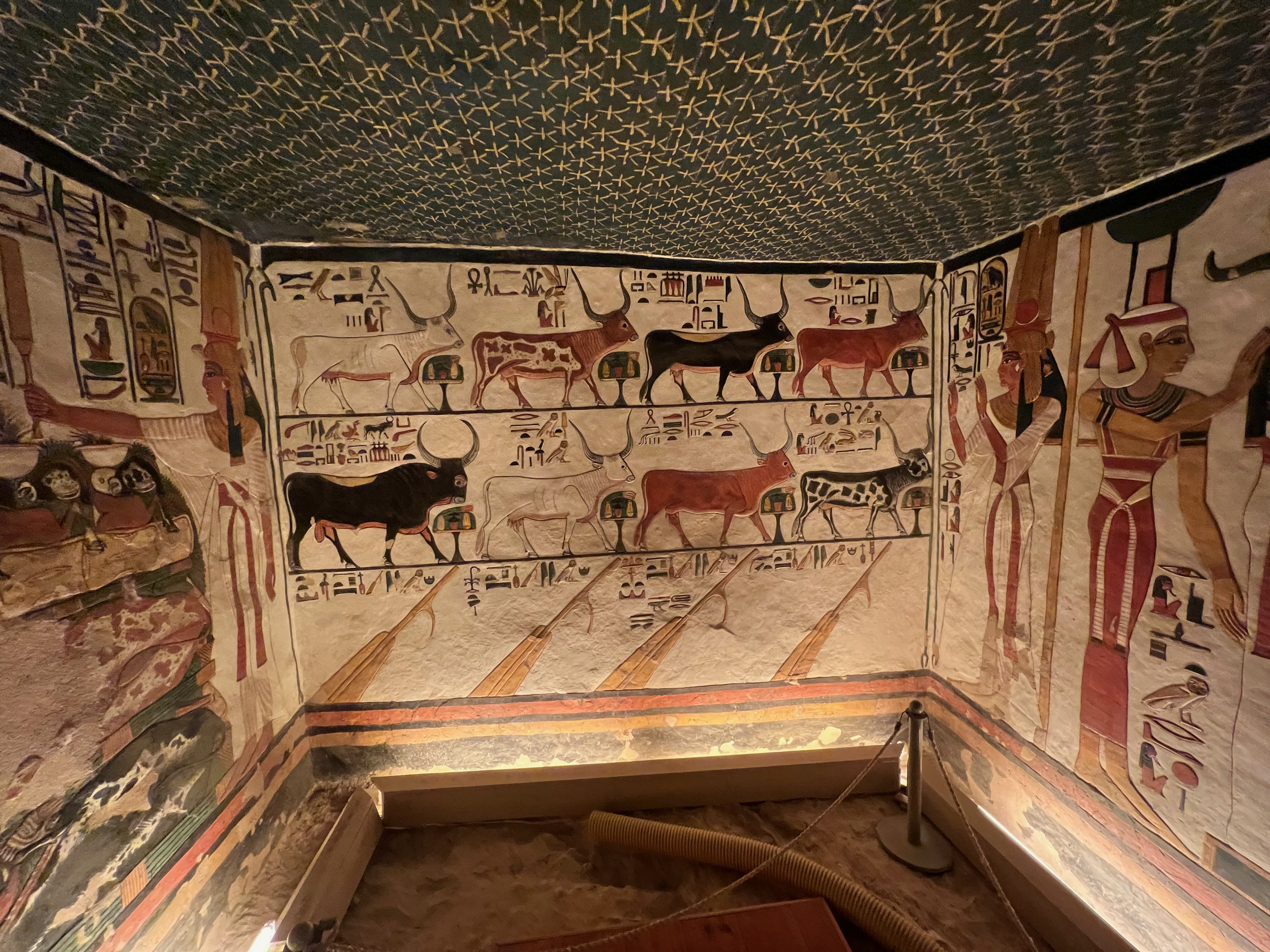
The Sky Bull and the Seven Cows depicted above four oars, first annex room

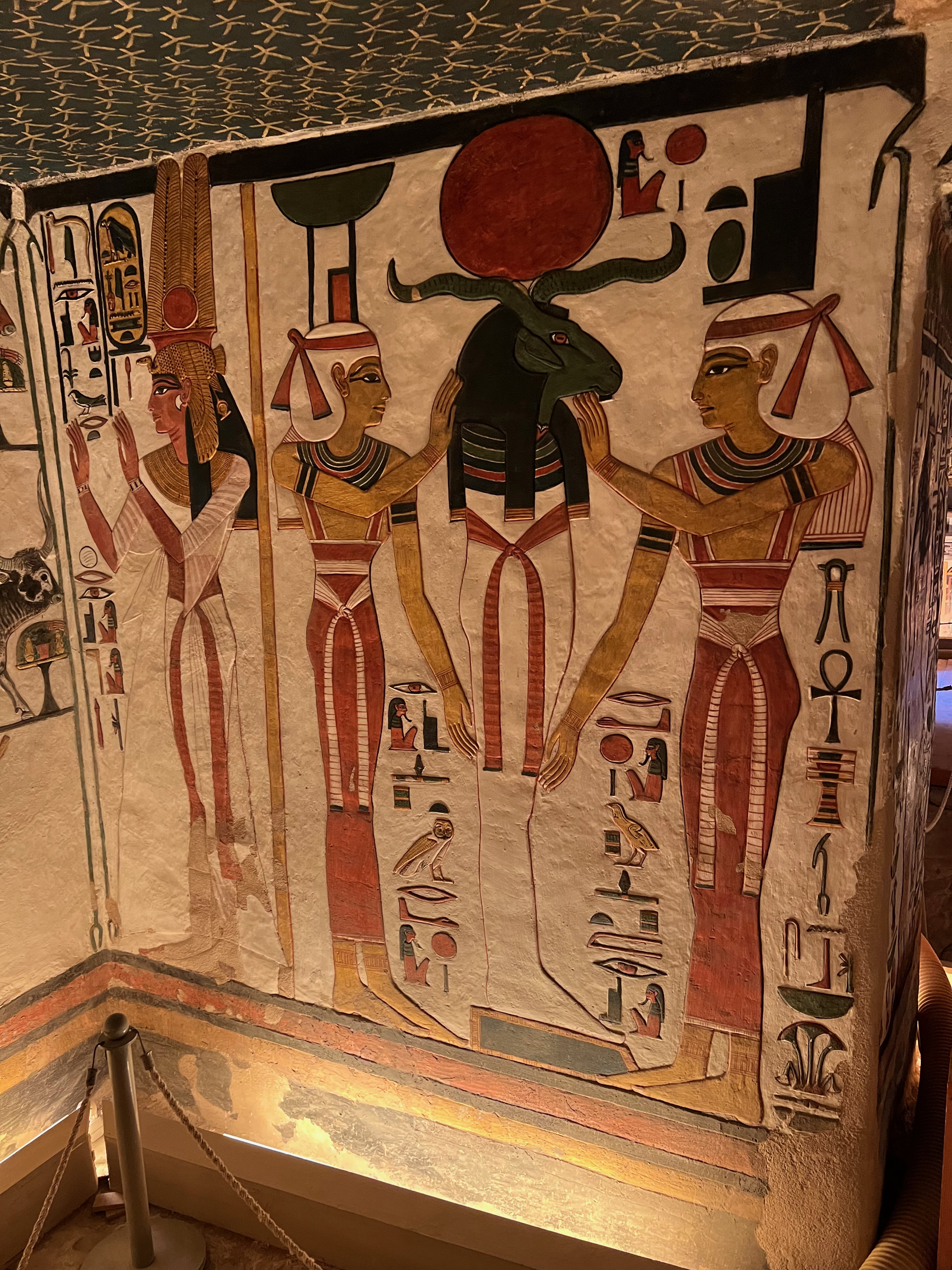
Nefertari praising the Seven Hathors (left), Nephthys and Isis with Banebdjedet (right), first annex room

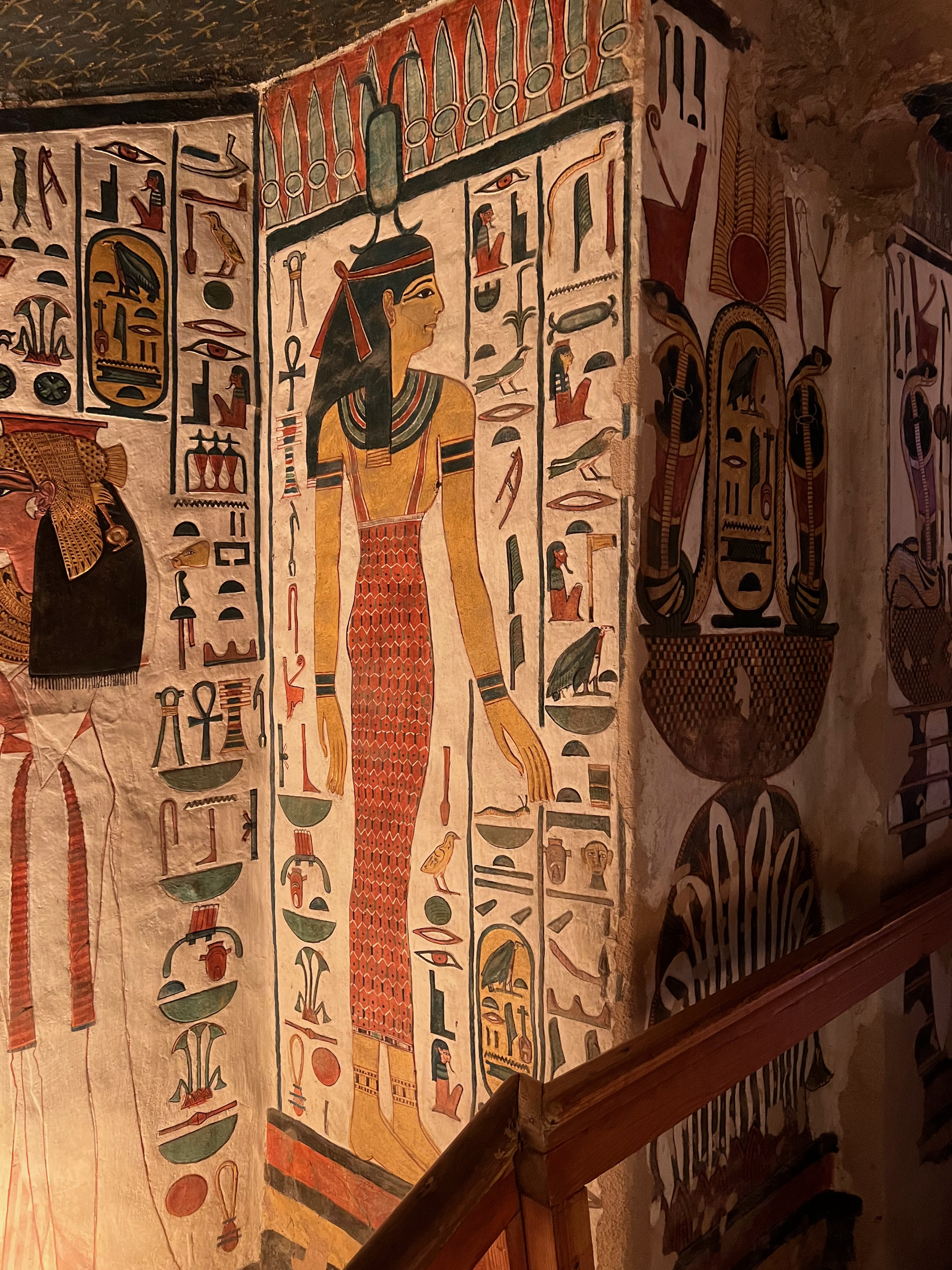
Neith depicted on a door jamb, interior staircase

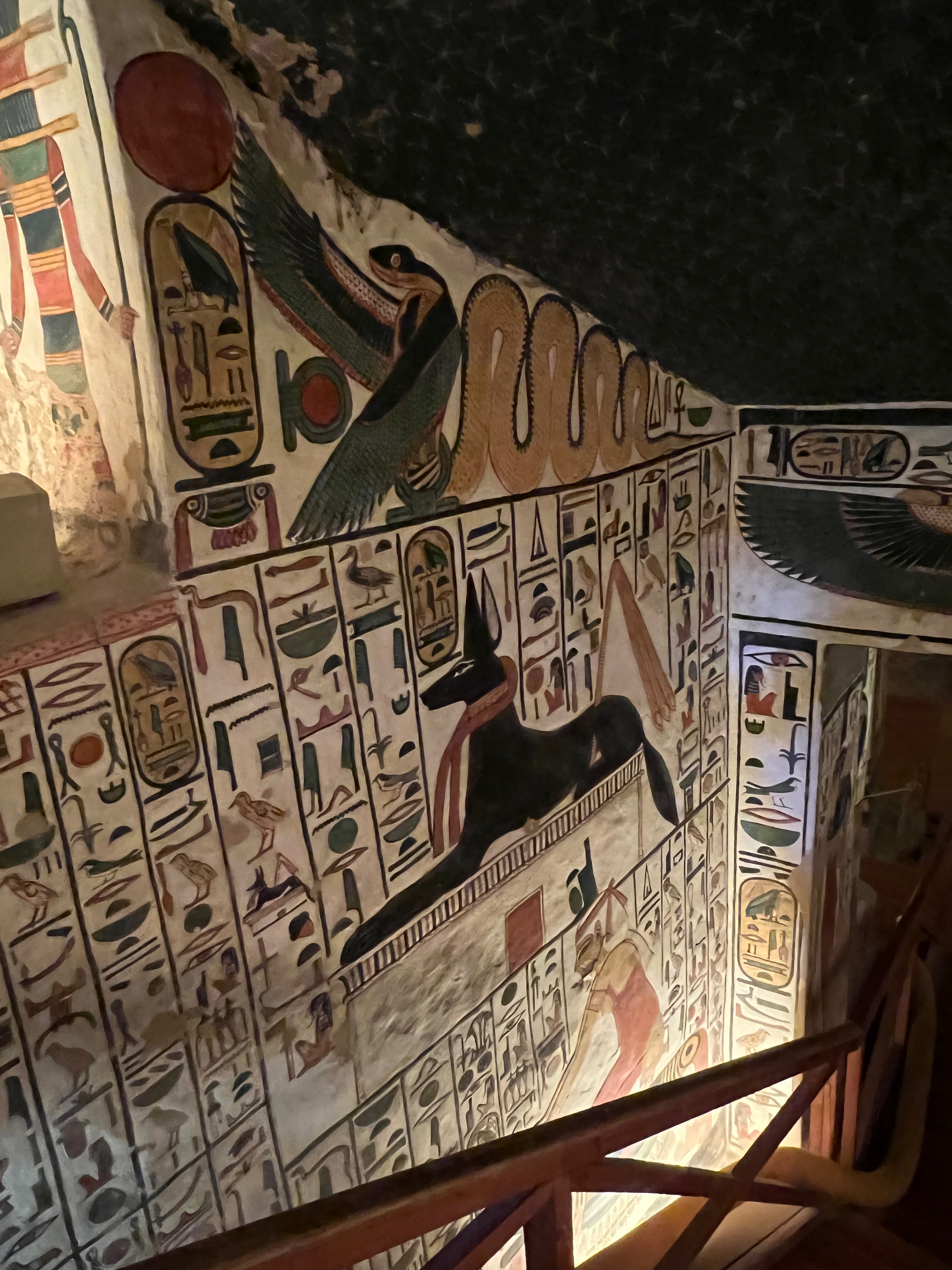
Wadjet (upper), Anubis (center), and Isis (lower) depicted on the left wall of the interior stairs

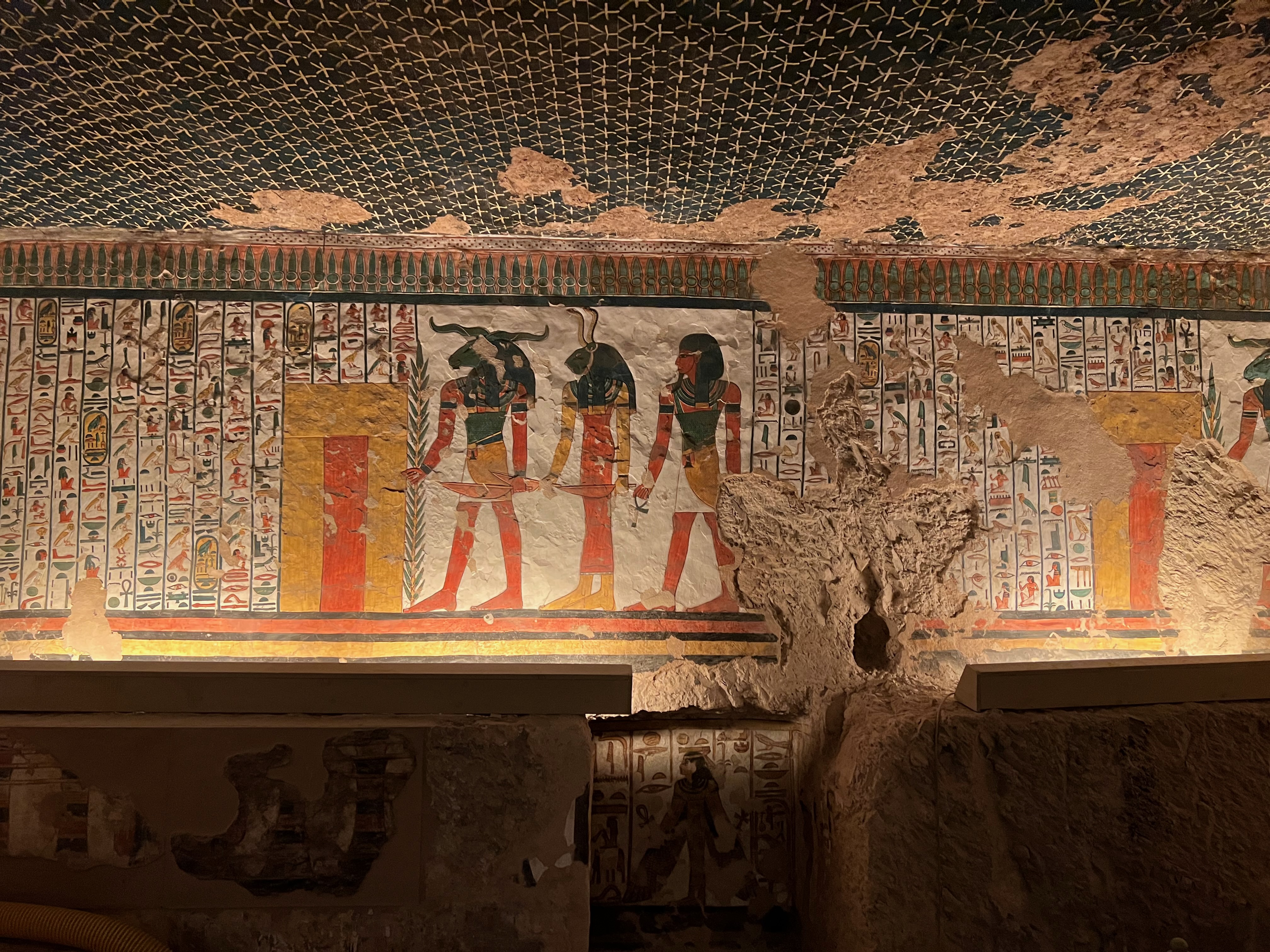
A row of underworld deities with Qed-her standing in the center (upper), Nut depicted in a niche between benches (lower)

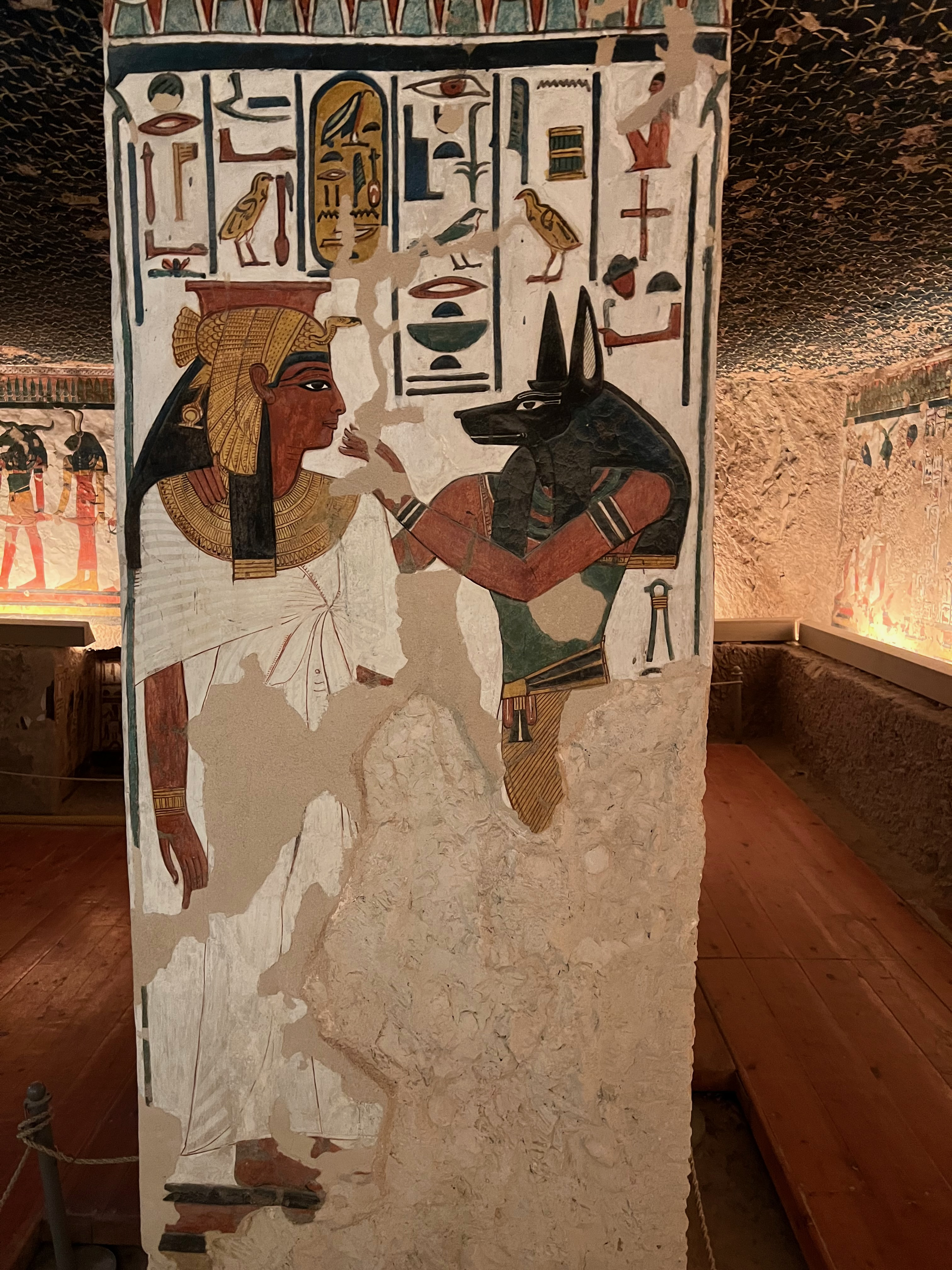
Nefertari being approached by Anubis, pillar in the burial chamber

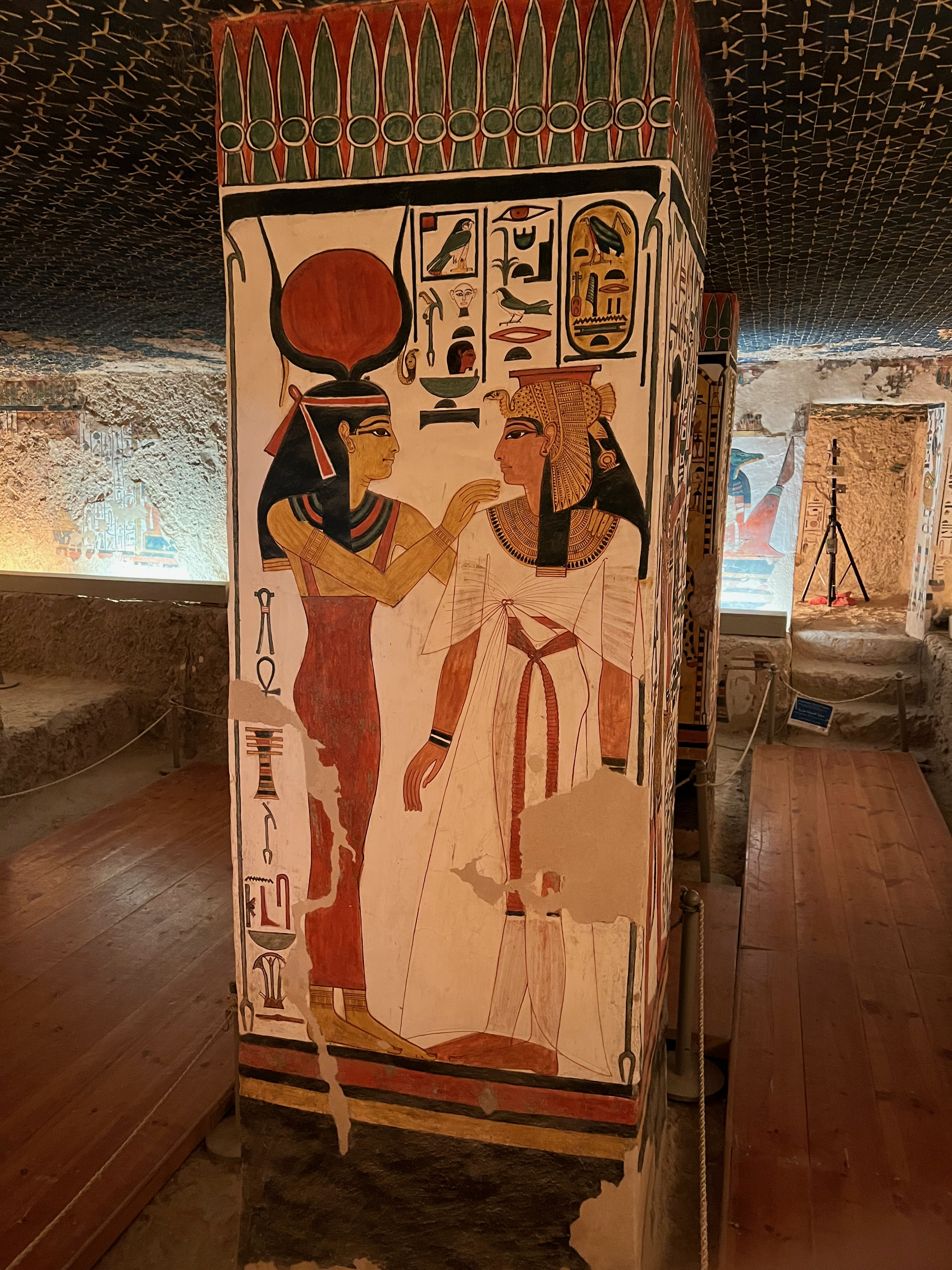
Nefertari being approached by Hathor, pillar in the burial chamber

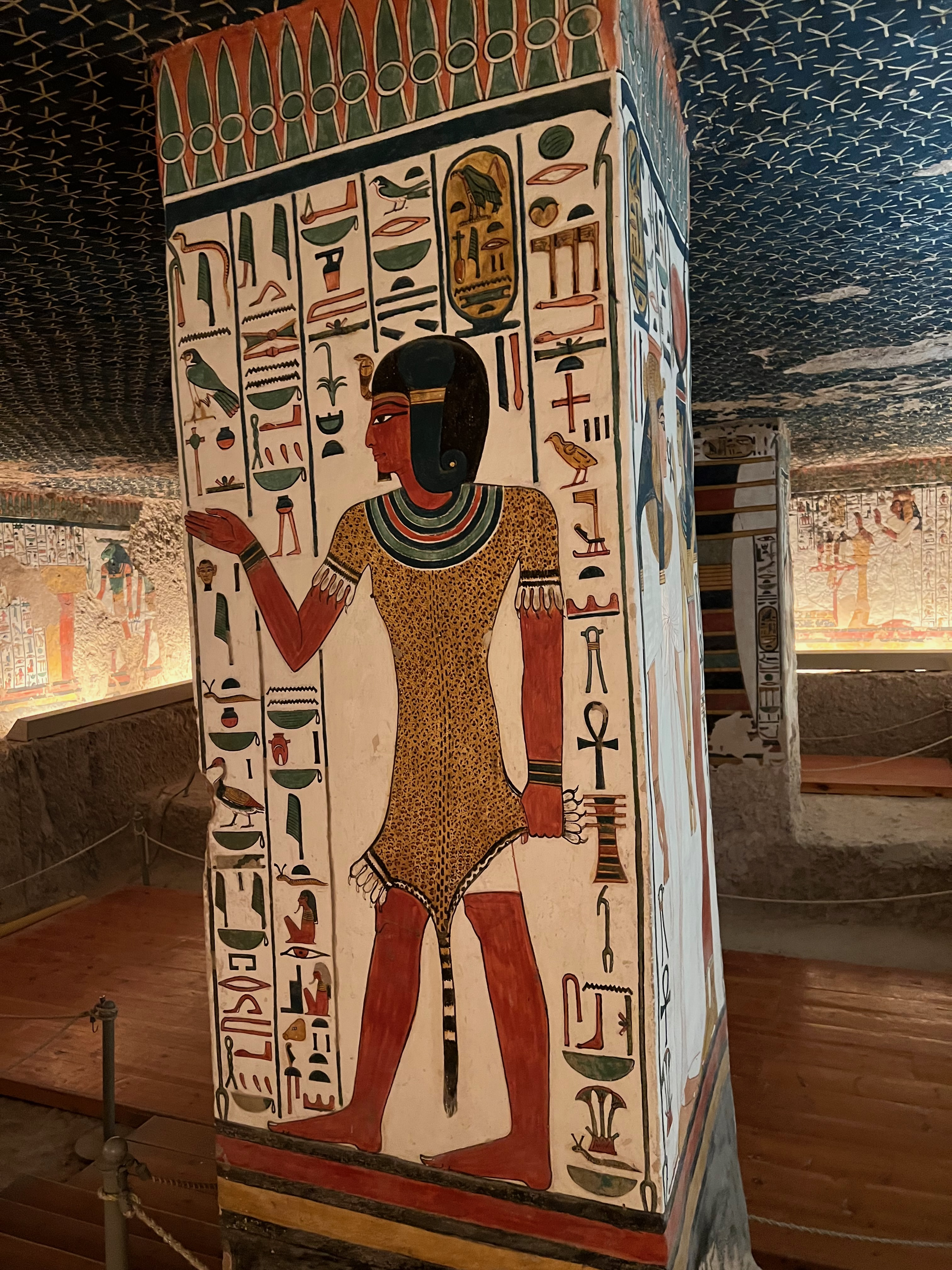
Horus-Iunmutef depicted on a pillar in the burial chamber

== See also ==
- List of Ancient Egyptian royal consorts
