= Ahmose (princess) =

Ancient Egyptian princess

- King's Daughter; King's Sister
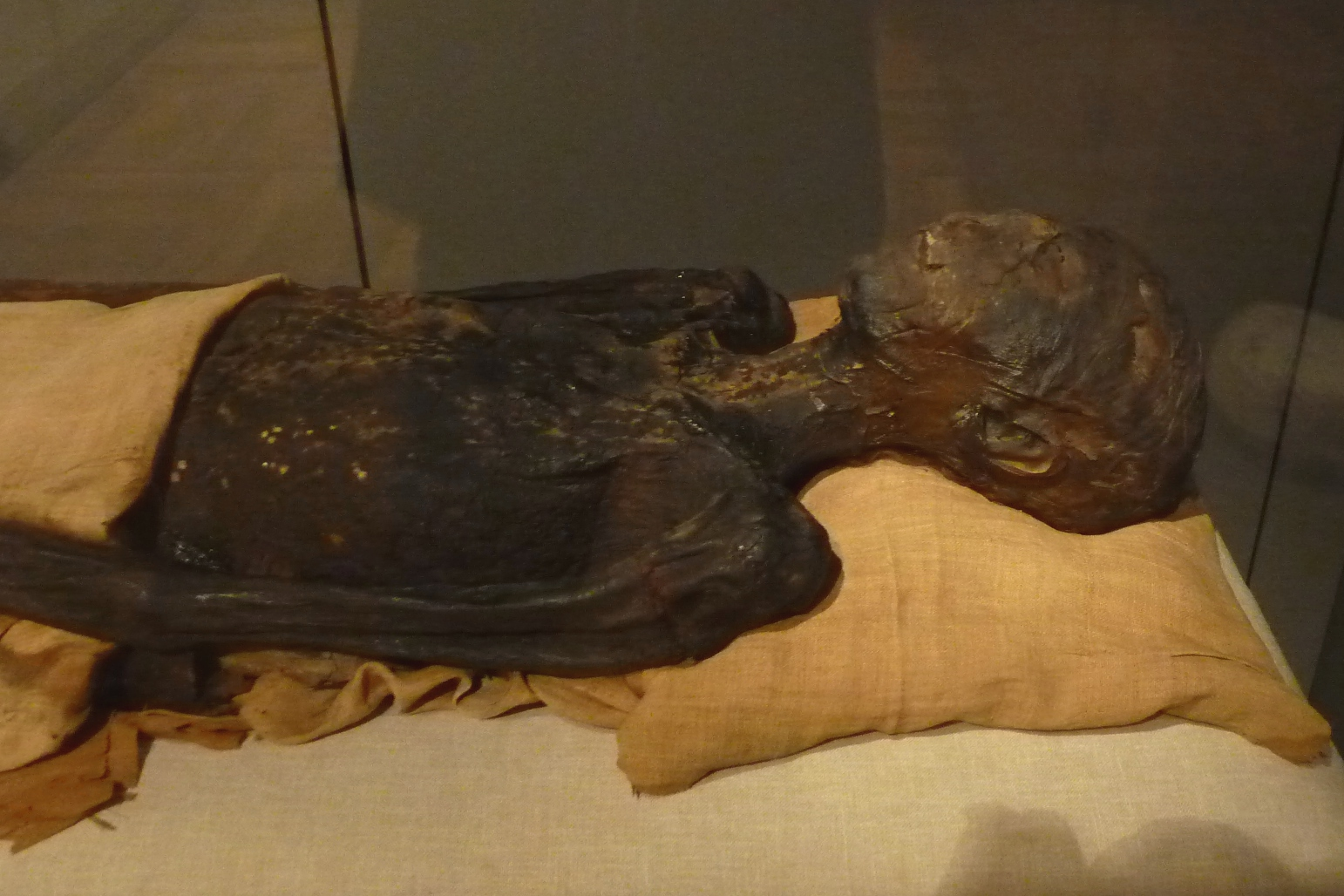
- Princess Ahmose's mummy in Museo Egizio, Turin
- Burial: QV47, Valley of the Queens
Egyptian name
iaH ms s B1
- Dynasty: 17th Dynasty
- Father: Seqenenre Tao
- Mother: Sitdjehuti

Ahmose ("Child of the Moon") was a princess of the Seventeenth Dynasty of Egypt.

== Biography ==
She was the only known daughter of Seqenenre Tao (the Brave) by his sister-wife Sitdjehuti. She was the half-sister of Pharaoh Ahmose I and Queen Ahmose-Nefertari. Her titles are King's Daughter; King's Sister.

== Burial ==
=== Tomb QV 47 ===
She was buried in the tomb QV47 in the Valley of the Queens. Her tomb is thought to be the first to be constructed in the Valley of the Queens. The tomb is fairly simple and consists of an entrance shaft and a burial chamber. The tomb is located in a subsidiary valley named the Valley of Prince Ahmose.

=== Mummy ===
The mummy of Princess Ahmose was discovered by Ernesto Schiaparelli during his excavations from 1903 to 1905. Her mummy is now in the Egyptian Museum of Turin, Italy.

=== Funerary goods ===
Besides the mummy, Schiaparelli also found funerary items including a fragment of her coffin, leather sandals, and fragments of a piece of linen inscribed with some 20 chapters of the Book of the Dead. All of these items are housed in Turin.
