= Nebetnehat =

Ancient Egyptian queen consort

nb t n h t M1
Nebetnehat
in hieroglyphs
Era: New Kingdom
(1550–1069 BC)

Nebetnehat ("Lady of the sycamore tree"; the name was one of the attributes of the goddess Hathor) was an ancient Egyptian queen consort during the mid-18th Dynasty. She was the Great Royal Wife of an unidentified pharaoh. Her name is known from alabaster canopic fragments, one now in the Petrie Museum and thought to come from the Valley of the Queens. Another fragment was found in a tomb (WB1) for several members of the royal family at the Wady Bairiya, her most likely burial place.

Granted the fact that she held the title of Great Royal Wife, she could have been someone relatively close to Amenhotep III, perhaps a daughter or some other female relative.
