= Valley of the Queens =

- وادي الملكات; Wādī al-Malekāt
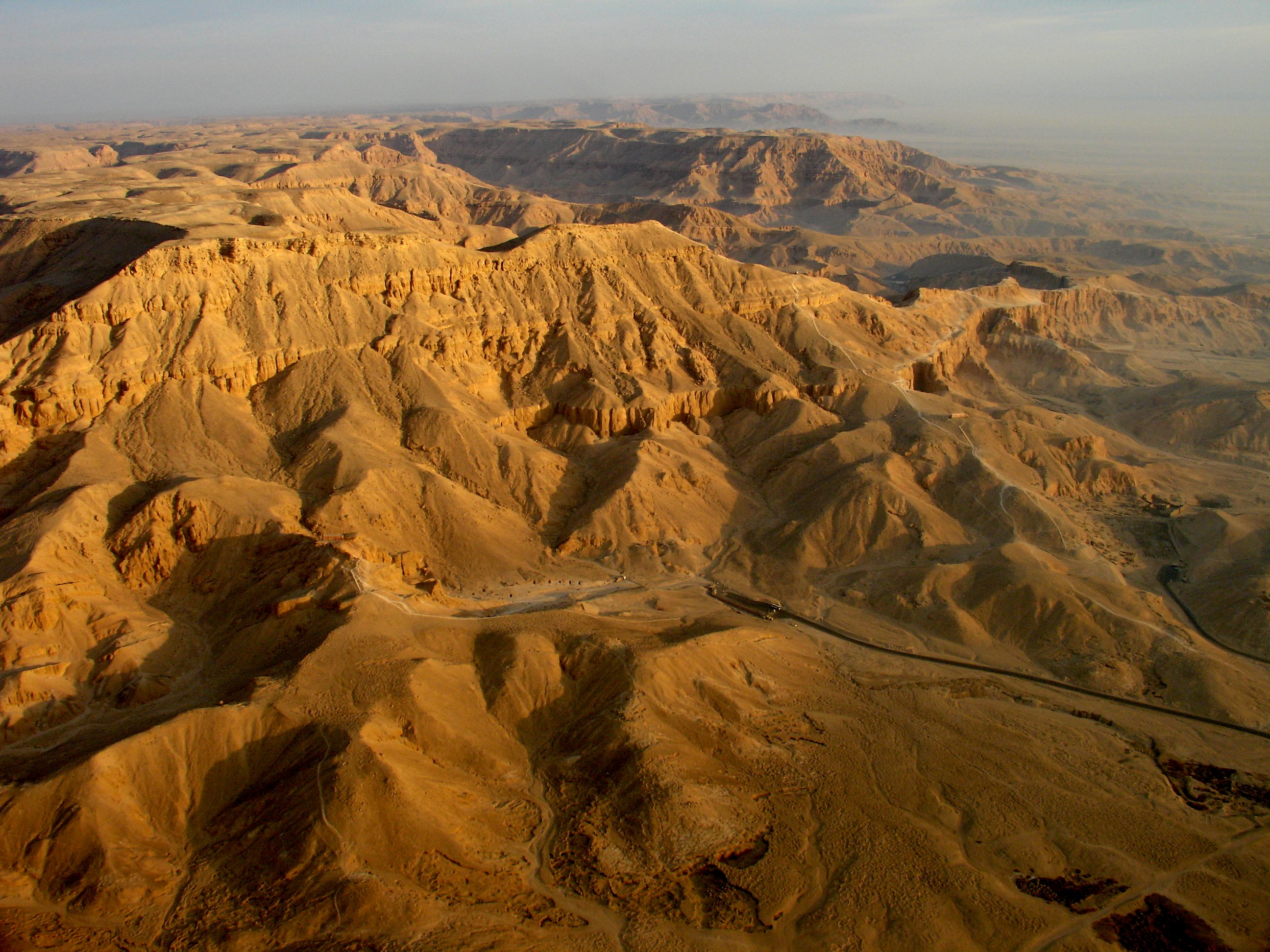
- General view of the Valley of the Queens

- Location within Egypt
- 25°43′39″N 32°35′35″E
- Location: Luxor, Egypt

UNESCO World Heritage Site
- Official name: Ancient Thebes with its Necropolis
- Type: Cultural
- Criteria: i, iii, vi
- Designated: 1979 (third session)
- Reference no.: 87
- Region: Arab states

Valley of the Queens in hieroglyphs
X1 G1 Q1 X1 O1 F35 F35 F35
Ta-set-neferu
T3-st-nfrw
The place of beauty

The Valley of the Queens (Note: Arabic: وادي الملكات Wādī al-Malekāt) is a site in Egypt, in which queens, princes, princesses, and other high-ranking officials were buried from roughly 1560 BC to 1130 BC. Pharaohs were buried in the Valley of the Kings. The Valley of the Queens was known anciently as Ta-Set-Neferu, which has a double meaning of "The Place of Beauty" and/or "the Place of the Royal Children". Excavation of the tombs at the Valley of the Queens was pioneered by Ernesto Schiaparelli and Francesco Ballerini in the early 1900s.

The Valley of the Queens consists of the main wadi, which contains most of the tombs, along with the Valley of Prince Ahmose, the Valley of the Rope, the Valley of the Three Pits, and the Valley of the Dolmen. The main wadi contains 91 tombs and the subsidiary valleys add another 19 tombs. The burials in the subsidiary valleys all date to the 18th Dynasty.

The reason for choosing the Valley of the Queens as a burial site is not known. The close proximity to the workers' village of Deir el-Medina and the Valley of the Kings may have been a factor. Another consideration could have been the existence of a sacred grotto dedicated to Hathor at the entrance of the Valley. This grotto may have been associated with rejuvenation of the dead.

Along with the Valley of the Kings and nearby Thebes, the Valley of the Queens was inscribed on the UNESCO World Heritage List in 1979.

== Geology ==
The Valley of the Queens is on a geological array of limestones, marls, clays, chalks, and shale. The clays in the valley have undergone expansion and shrinkage due to recurrent flash-flooding throughout the valley. This shrinkage has been one cause of unstable tomb construction and later tomb damage in the valley. Rockslides resulting from shrunk clay deposits and tectonic events have damaged not only the tombs of the valley but also the wall paintings within them.

The current landscape of the Valley of the Queens was built through faulting and subsequent slumping during the Pliocene and Pleistocene epochs. Thus, the original horizontal stratigraphy of the area has been subject to tilting. This tilting has revealed deposits of minerals like anhydrite, gypsum, and halite. Salt from halite in the ground is also damaging to the paintings within tombs. Seeping groundwater has permeated the tombs and is the cause of the dissolved and recrystallized salt.

Gypsum, along with clay, is most often believed to be the plasters used in ancient Egypt. Due to the lack of data, however, it is hard to determine what exactly composes the ancient plasters. Such beliefs are contested because of variations of plaster color, hardness, and amount used in a particular tomb.

== Eighteenth Dynasty ==
One of the first tombs constructed in the Valley of the Queens is the tomb of Princess Ahmose, a daughter of Seqenenre Tao and Queen Sitdjehuti. This tomb likely dates to the reign of Thutmose I. The tombs from this period also include several members of the nobility, including a head of the stables and a vizier.

The tombs from the Valley of the Three Pits mostly date to the Thutmosid period. The tombs are labeled with letters A - L. This valley also contains three shaft tombs, which are the origin of the valley's name. The modern labels for these three tombs are QV 89, QV 90, and QV 91.

The Valley of the Dolmen contains an old trail used by the workmen traveling from Deir el-Medina to the Valley of the Queens. Along this path is a small rock-cut temple dedicated to Ptah and Meretseger.

The tombs from this time period are generally simple in form and consist of a chamber and a shaft for burial. Some of the tombs were extended in size to accommodate more than one burial. The tombs include those of several royal princes and princesses, as well as some nobles.

It has long been thought that that finds located in museums which include fragments of burial equipment for several members of the royal family were from the Valley of the Queens. However, these items which include a canopic jar fragment of the King's Wife Henut, canopic jar fragments mentioning a King's Son, Menkheperre, a King's Great Wife, Nebetnehat, canopic jar fragments with the name of the King's Daughter Ti, all come from the Shaft Tombs of Wadi Bairiya 4.5 kilometres north-west of the Valley of the Queens.

== Nineteenth Dynasty ==
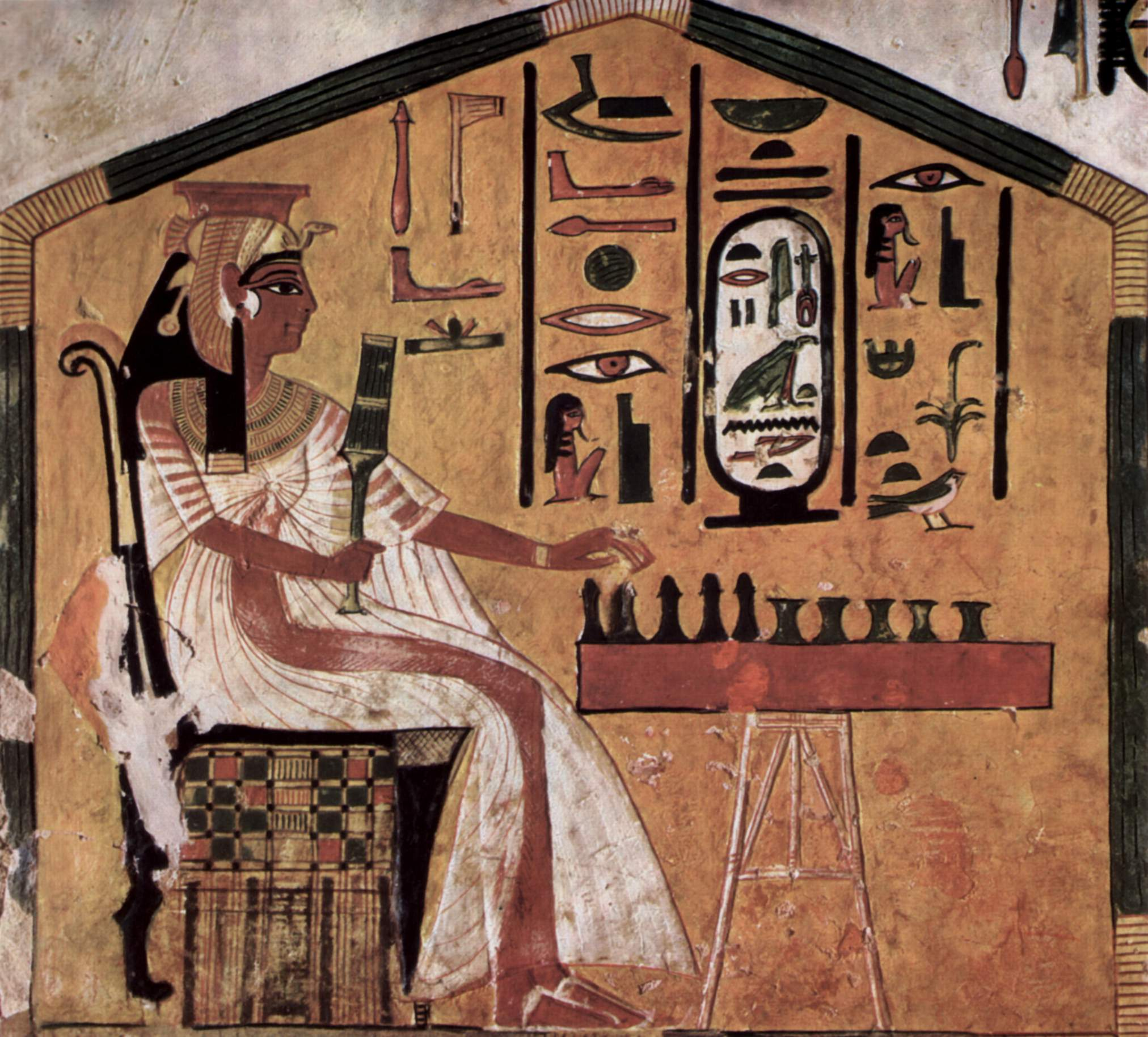
Scene from the tomb of Nefertari

During the 19th Dynasty the use of the Valley became more selective. The tombs from this period belong exclusively to royal women. Many of the high-ranking wives of Ramesses I, Seti I and Ramesses II were buried in the Valley. One of the most well-known examples is the resting place carved out of the rock for Queen Nefertari (1290–1224 BCE). The polychrome reliefs in her tomb are still intact. Other members of the royal family continued to be buried in the Valley of the Kings. Tomb KV5, the tomb of the sons of Ramesses II, is an example of this practice.

The tomb of Queen Satre (QV 38) was likely the first tomb prepared during this dynasty. It was probably started during the reign of Ramesses I and finished during the reign of Seti I. Several tombs were prepared without an owner in mind, and the names were included upon the death of the royal female.

== Twentieth Dynasty ==
During the beginning of the 20th Dynasty the Valley was still used extensively. Tombs for the wives of Ramesses III were prepared, and in a departure from the conventions of the previous dynasty, several tombs were prepared for royal sons as well. The construction of tombs continued at least until the reign of Ramesses VI. The Turin Papyrus mentions the creation of six tombs during the reign of Ramesses VI. It is not known which tombs are referred to in that papyrus.

There is evidence of economic turmoil during the 20th Dynasty. Records show that the workers went on strike during the reign of Ramesses III, and towards the end of the dynasty there are reports of tomb robberies.

== Third Intermediate Period and later ==
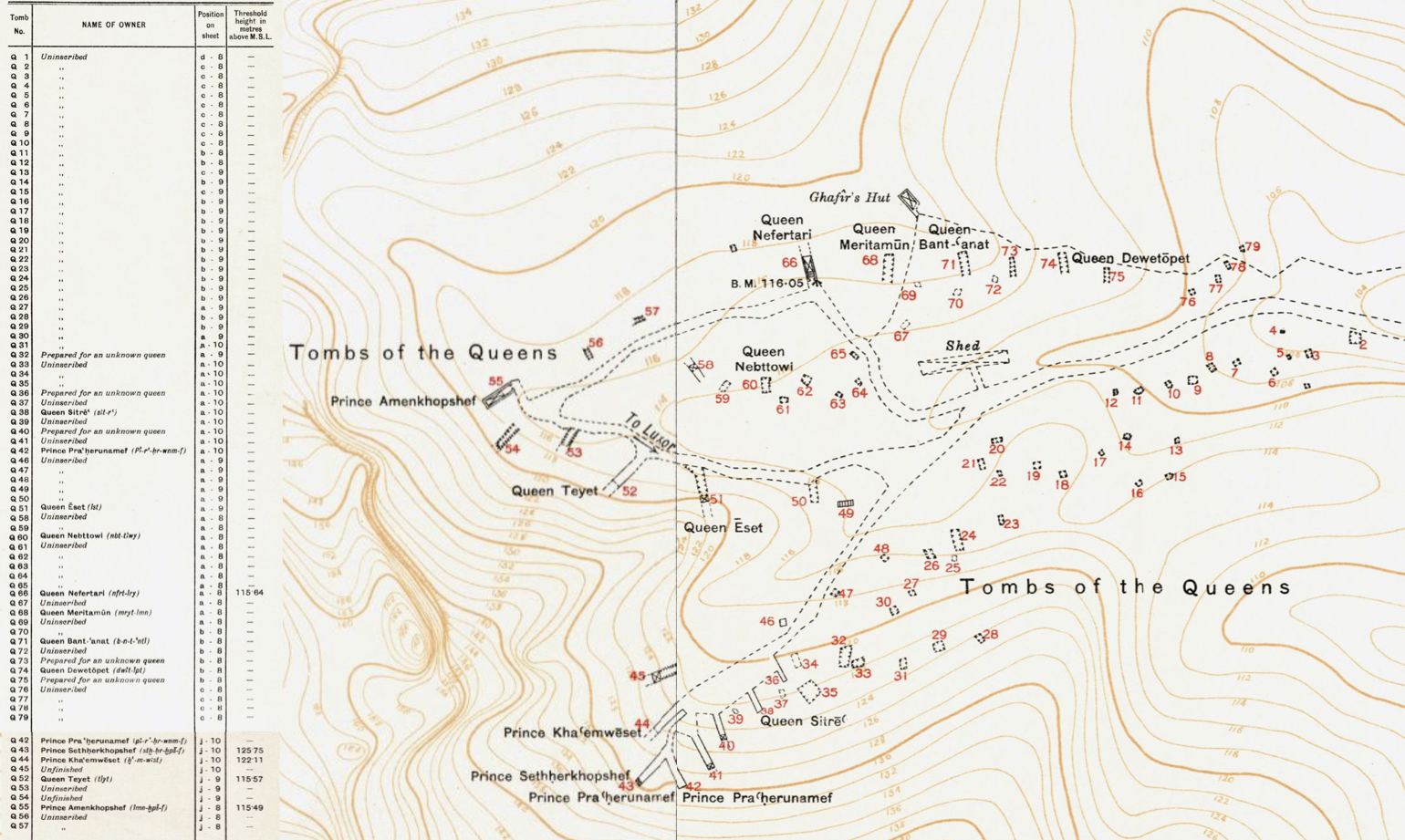
Valley of the Queens by the Survey of Egypt

The Valley was no longer a royal burial site after the close of the 20th Dynasty. Many of the tombs were extensively reused. Several tombs were modified so that they could hold multiple burials. In some cases this involved digging burial pits in the existing tombs. Not much is known about the use of the Valley of the Queens during the Ptolemaic Period but during the Roman Period there was a renewed, extensive use of the Valley as a burial site. During the Coptic Period some Hermit shelters were erected. Tombs QV60 (Nebettawy) and QV73 (Henuttawy) show signs of Coptic occupation. Wall scenes were covered with plaster and decorated with Christian symbols. The Christian presence lasted until the 7th century CE.

== Threats to conservation ==
Conservation efforts in the Valley of the Queens happen in multiple ways. Some large concerns for the site include protection against mass tourism and a concoction of other natural risks.

=== Mass tourism ===
With the rise of the tourism industry, effects humans have on archaeological sites is becoming a topic of interest for preservation teams. Due to their relatively small size and delicate ecosystem, many of the Valley of the Queens tombs are threatened by human interaction. An off balance of humidity and CO_{2} from humans contributes to the continued degradation of tombs and the art within them. Other factors that lead to tomb deterioration are graffiti, touching, and head bumping due to small spaces.

Light fixtures installed in some of the tombs for better viewing are also a threat to conservation efforts in the area. Large amounts of lint from visitors' clothes stays in the air and settles on tomb floors and other fixtures, creating an increased fire hazard. As lint settles on the modern light fixtures, the likeliness of combustion increases.

Steps taken to combat and limit effects on Valley of the Queens tombs from tourism consist of building walled paths that control tourist traffic, constructing shelters at some of the more popular tombs such as QV 66 - Nefertari's tomb. Other methods used to preserve Nefertari's tomb are a viewing time limited to 15 minutes, separate ticket purchase, and the addition of an air-circulation system to the tomb. As for other tombs, plexiglass shields and wooden floors have been installed to protect the entombed and their resting places.

=== Animal populations ===
Commonly located in open tombs in the Valley of the Queens are small to large bat colonies. Although beneficial for the natural ecosystem, bats are detrimental to the tombs, the wall paintings, and the health of tourists in the valley. Urine and feces from bats damages the rocks, plasters, and paints used for tomb construction and decoration. Also stemming from bat excrement is the increased possibility of visitors getting histoplasmosis. Contact with bat populations also increases the possibility of bat bites and rabies transmission.

In an attempt to limit bat occupation of certain tombs, installation of doors and has been proposed. Bat populations must be removed from the tombs before any preventative measures can be taken. Due to ecological importance, some tombs have been selected to remain open to bat colonies. Tombs selected are as follows: QV 15, QV 48, and QV 78.

== Burials ==
The Valley of the Queens‚ located near Luxor‚ Egypt‚ was the burial site for queens and other royal family members from the New Kingdom era․ Graves constructed during the Eighteenth Dynasty in the Valley of the Queens often consisted of shaft graves with underground burial chambers․ Carefully decorated burial chambers and corridors were common in Nineteenth and Twentieth Dynasty graves․ Burials at the Valley of the Queens site also include those of Queen Nefertari‚ Queen Tyti‚ and sons of Pharaoh Ramesses III: Princes Pareherunemef‚ Khaemwaset‚ and Sethherkhepshef․ Religious symbols related to ancient Egyptian views of death and the afterlife are commonly depicted in tombs at the Valley of the Queens site․

Early royal burials

Eighteenth Dynasty tombs in the Valley of the Queens have vertical shafts leading to burial chambers below the surface․ These tombs are less complex than tombs from later dynasties․ Some Eighteenth Dynasty royal burials in the Valley of the Queens include the tomb of Princess Ahmose‚ the daughter of Seqenenre Tao and Queen Sitdjehuti․

Royal burials from the Nineteenth and Twentieth Dynasties of Egypt

The Valley of the Queens was a burial area for queens and other royal offspring during the Nineteenth and Twentieth Dynasties․ 19th and 20th Dynasties tombs often had multiple passageways and rooms and featured artwork with religious scenes showing the tomb occupant interacting with Egyptian deities․ This type of artwork communicates ancient Egyptian beliefs about the afterlife․

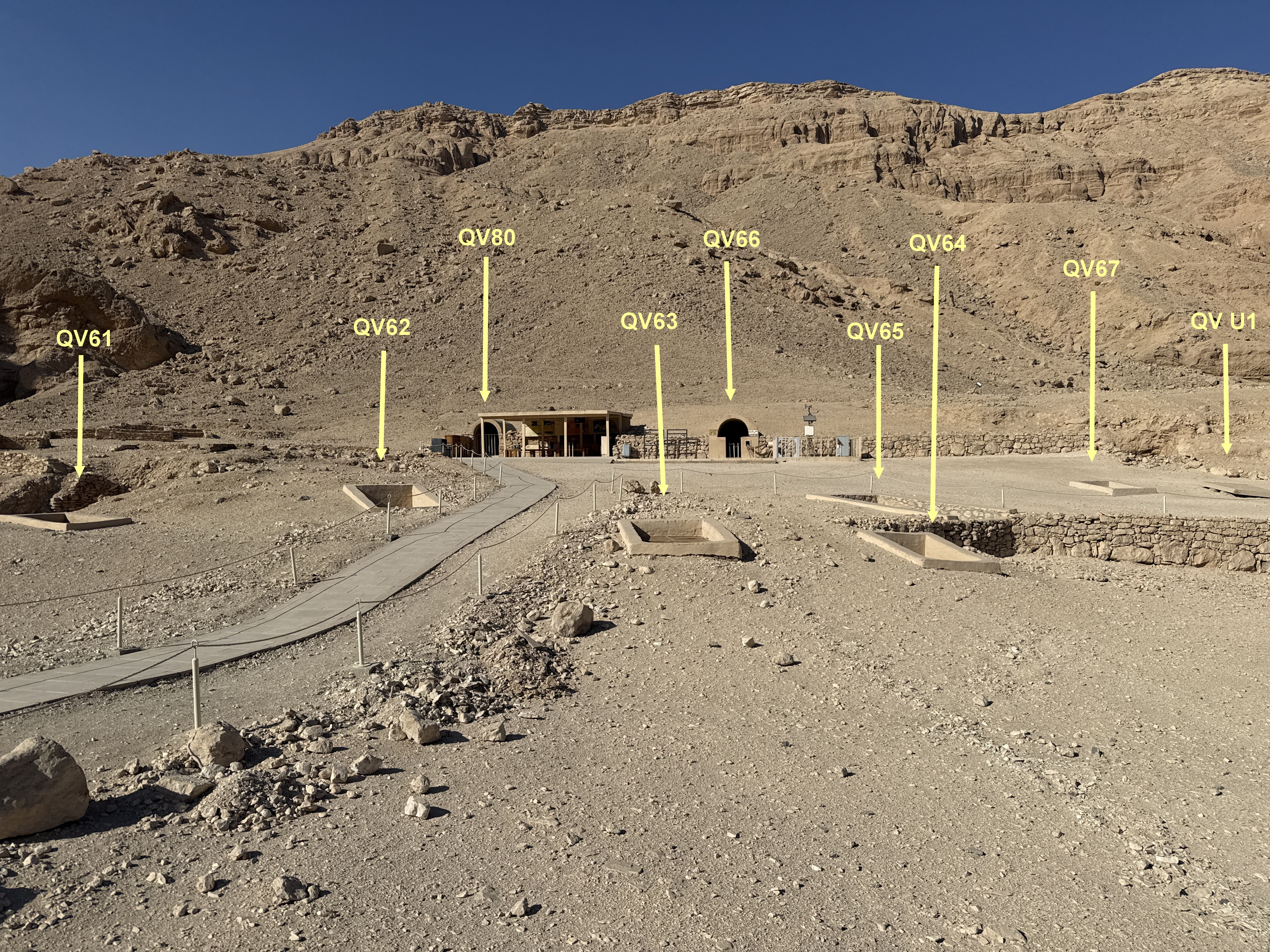

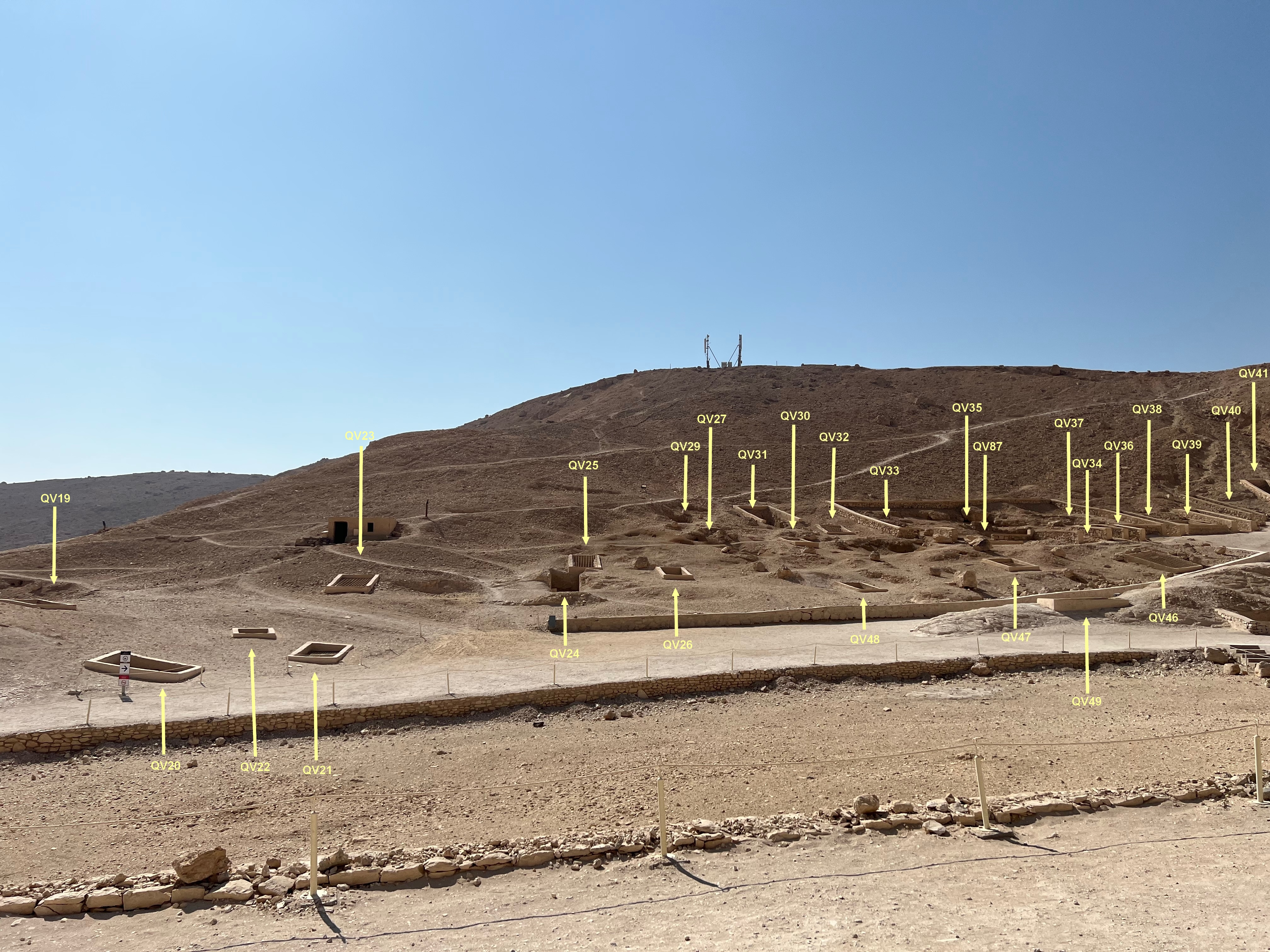

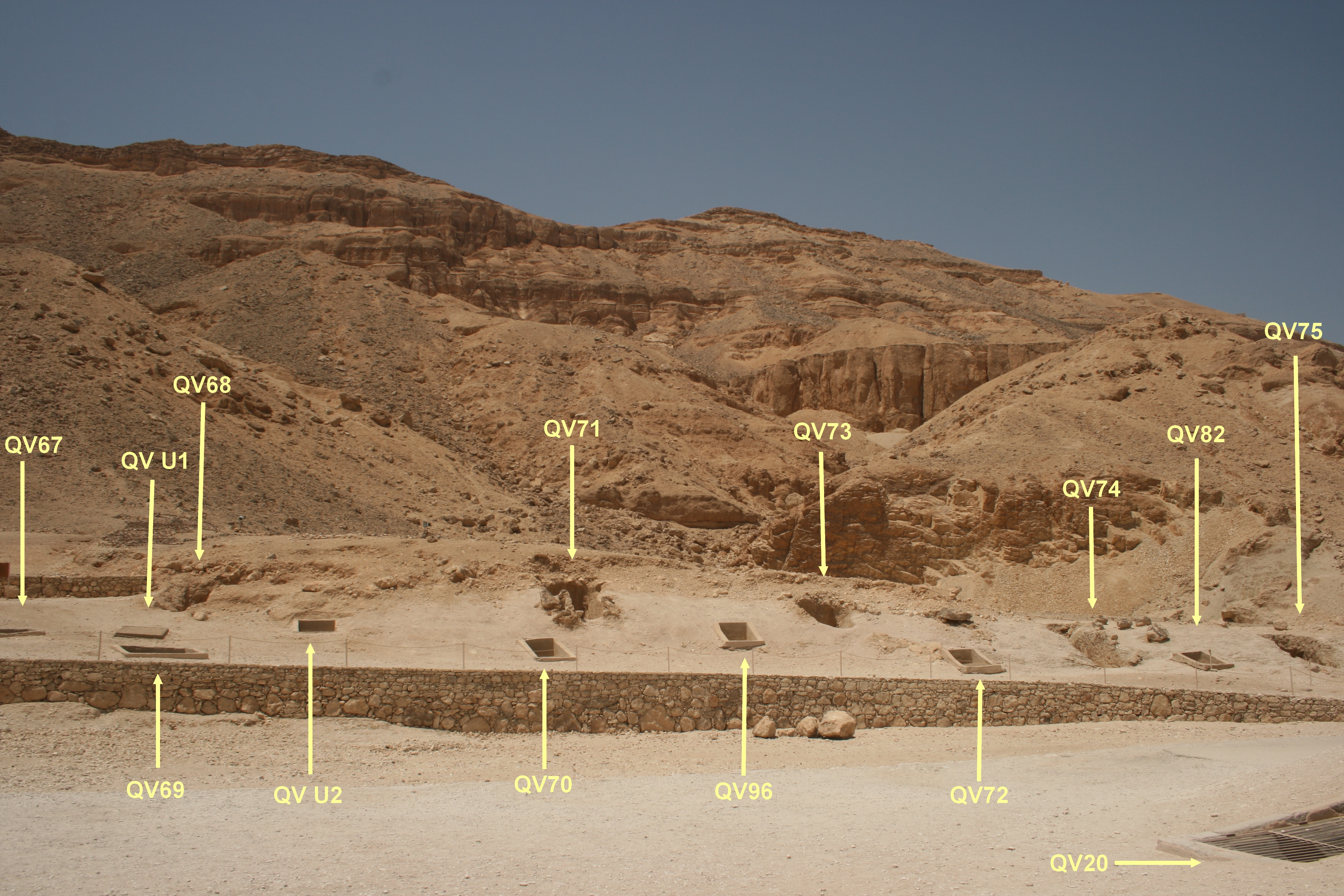

== Notable Tombs ==
Tomb of Queen Nefertari (QV66)

The tomb of Queen Nefertari (QV66)‚ the wife of Ramesses II‚ belongs to the Nineteenth Dynasty․ Some chambers in the tomb of Queen Nefertari contain scenes and other artifacts depicting Queen Nefertari among Egyptian deities and other depictions of the afterlife in ancient Egypt․ Italian Egyptologist Ernesto Schiaparelli excavated the tomb in 1904․ Objects excavated from and stolen from the tomb of Queen Nefertari thousands of years ago include fragments of a pink granite sarcophagus‚ sandals‚ pottery‚ shabtis‚ and preserved leg bones․ In 2016‚ Michael E․ Habicht and other scientists used radiological and chemical analyzes and radiocarbon dating to study these and other objects from the tomb․ Habicht and colleagues suggested that the leg bones probably belonged to Queen Nefertari but were unable to confirm the identification․

Tomb QV17

Tomb QV17 is an Eighteenth Dynasty shaft tomb with a large unadorned burial chamber․ A Franco-Egyptian excavation team investigated the tomb in 1986 and evidence of tomb robbery and two mummy jars bearing inscriptions naming two princesses‚ Merytra (I) and Urmerutes․ Archaeologist Anne-Marie Loyrette suggests that Merytra (I) and Urmerutes might have been daughters of Amenhotep III․ Relationships among the princesses are not known․ Information from the tomb provides clues about royal burial practices during the Eighteenth Dynasty․

Tomb of Prince Pareherunemef (QV42)

Tomb QV42 was built for Prince Pareherunemef‚ a son of Ramesses III․ QV42 contains a ramp and corridor to the burial chamber․ Tomb excavations by Ernesto Schiaparelli included fragmented granite sarcophagi with damaged cartouches‚ suggesting that QV42 was reoccupied at some point․ Other sources suggest that Minefer‚ a wife of Ramesses III‚ was the builder of QV42‚ but this is uncertain․ Other excavations of QV42 turned up shabtis with inscriptions and other evidence of brick repairs․

Tomb of Prince Khaemwaset (QV44)

Tomb QV44 belonged to Prince Khaemwaset‚ another son of Ramesses III․ Tomb QV44 was discovered by Schiaparelli in 1903․ Corridors and small chambers extend from the main corridor to a burial chamber in tomb QV44․ Remains of a sarcophagus and other objects and mummies from later periods in wooden coffins in tomb QV44 indicate that the tomb was reused in later periods.

== Archaeological Excavations and Discoveries ==
Ostracon No. 5646 from Valley of the Queens

Italian archaeologist Ernesto Schiaparelli excavated at the Valley of the Queens site in the early 1900s and documented other details of royal burials and structures found at the site․ Artifacts recovered during Schiaparelli's excavations at the site included artifacts from the tombs of Queen Nefertari and Prince Khaemwaset‚ including fragments of sarcophagi and other burial objects from royal burials․ Other artifacts recovered during Schiaparelli's excavations at the site included inscriptions and other evidence of ancient tomb construction and decoration․ Other information from Schiaparelli's work on the site includes information about ancient Egyptian burial and architectural customs from the New Kingdom period․ This information and other findings from Schiaparelli's excavations have been useful in studying and documenting the royal cemetery․

Ostraca and Construction Records

Excavations by Ernesto Schiaparelli in 1903-20 uncovered ostraca‚ fragments of ceramics and limestone with inscriptions and other markings․ Ostraca from the New Kingdom provide information about labor and art practices‚ including ostraca with the names of workers and other data about their time off and use of oil lamps while working on tombs․ Ostraca from the reign of Ramesses III‚ particularly years 16-26 of his reign‚ provide information about labor practices during the Twentieth Dynasty․ Other ostraca show images of royalty and tomb layouts and were likely used as models by artists decorating tombs․

== Bibliography ==
- Sims, Lesley (2000). A Visitor's Guide to Ancient Egypt. Saffron Hill, London: Usborne Publishing. ISBN 0746030673.
- Esplorazione della “Valle delle Regine” nella necropoli di Tebe (1924) by Ernesto Schiaparelli․
- Valley of the Queens Assessment Report‚ Volume 1: Conservation and Management Planning‚ by Martha Demas and Neville Agnew (2012)․
- Theban Mapping Project's “Valley of the Queens and Western Wadis․”
- Habicht et al․‚ “Queen Nefertari‚ the Royal Spouse of Pharaoh Ramses II: A Multidisciplinary Investigation of the Mummified Remains Found in Her Tomb (QV66)” (2016).

== Sources ==
- Bunson, Margaret (1991). "Valley of the Queens". Encyclopædia of Ancient Egypt. New York. ISBN 9780816020935.
