= QV52 =

Ancient Egyptian tomb in the Valley of the Queens

Tomb of Tyti
- QV52
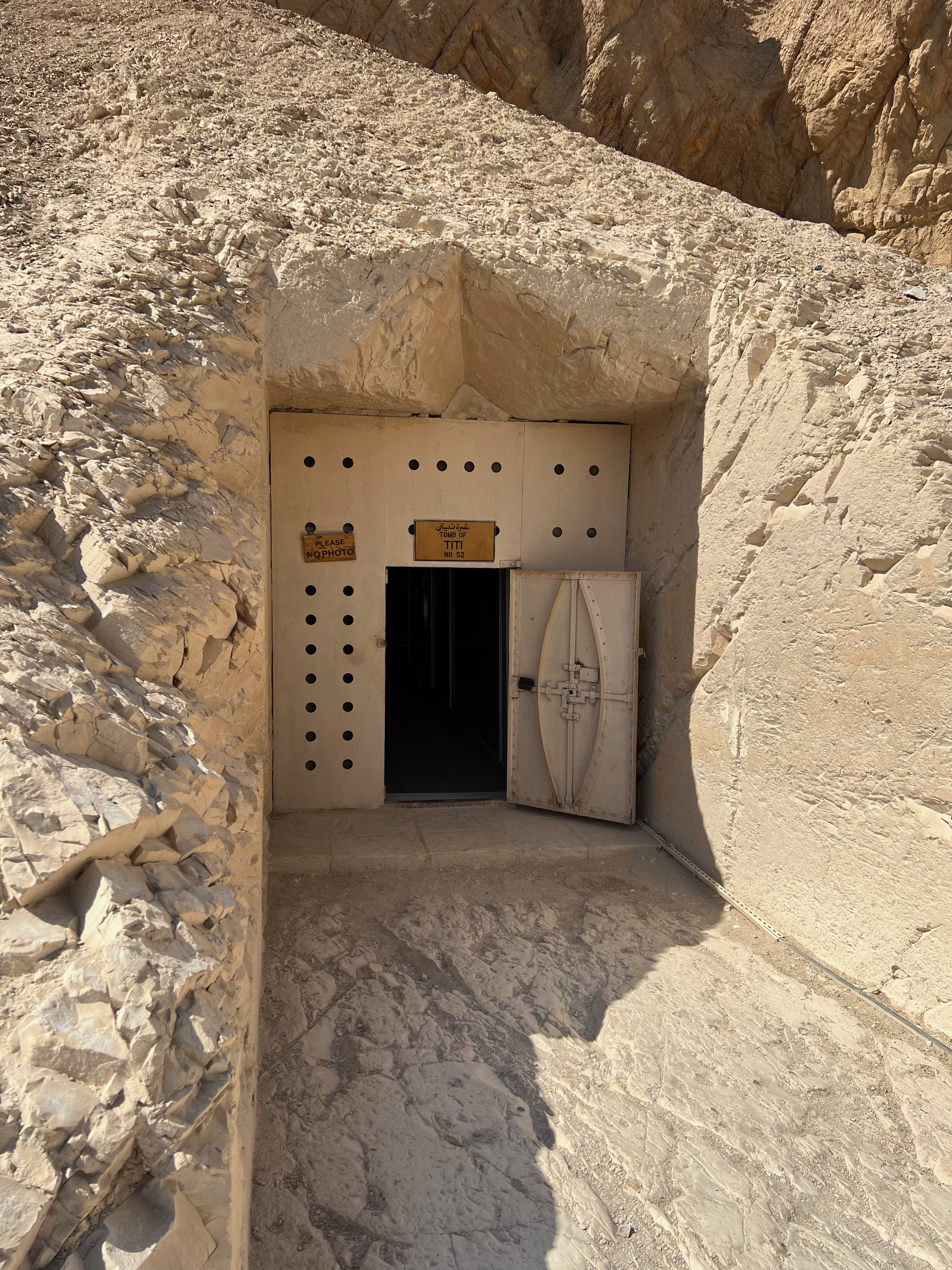
- Entrance to tomb QV52

- Location within Egypt
- 25.7274955°N 32.5922920°E
- Type: Tomb
- Periods: Twentieth Dynasty of Egypt, 12th century BC
- Cultures: Ancient Egyptian
- Location: Luxor, Egypt
- Region: Valley of the Queens, Theban Necropolis
- Part of: Valley of the Queens, Theban Necropolis

Site notes
- Material: Greyish marl with flint
- Excavation dates: 1903–1904
- Archaeologists: Ernesto Schiaparelli
- Discovered: Early 19th century

The Tomb of Tyti, also known as QV52, is a tomb in the Valley of the Queens, within the Theban Necropolis, on the west bank of the Nile opposite Luxor, Egypt. It was cut for Queen Tyti, wife of Ramesses III and, according to the most widely accepted identification, mother of Ramesses IV.

The inscriptions in the tomb record Tyti's royal titles; the painted and relief decoration follows the deceased queen on her journey through the Duat, the Egyptian underworld, showing the protection of Osiris and rebirth through the solar cycle. The plan includes a ramped access, a corridor, a burial chamber, two side chambers and a rear chamber. The tomb was reused during the Third Intermediate Period.

== Tomb owner ==
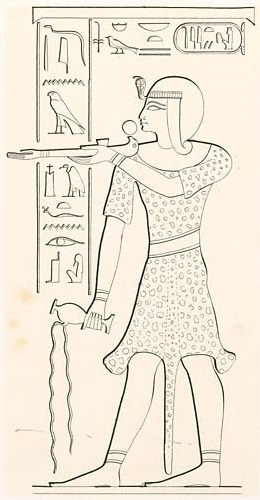
Queen Tyti shown in the costume of the Iunmutef priest, from Denkmäler aus Aegypten und Aethiopien by Karl Richard Lepsius, 1845.

The tomb belonged to Queen Tyti, who is named in its inscriptions with the titles of king's daughter, king's sister, king's wife and king's mother. A comparison between Anthony Harris's nineteenth-century copies of P. BM EA 10052, 6.22–23, and surviving fragments of the papyrus identified a Queen Tyti as a royal wife of Ramesses III; QV52 has therefore been connected with the burial mentioned in the same papyrus, while Ramesses IV is the most likely king to whom the title of king's mother in the tomb refers. Before this comparison, the identity of Tyti's husband and children had been explained in different ways. One proposal, put forward by Christian Leblanc, made her the mother also of the princes Khaemwaset, Amun-her-khepeshef and Ramesses-Meryamen, buried respectively in QV44, QV55 and QV53, whose tombs have decorative schemes similar to that of QV52.

== History ==
The tomb was made during the Twentieth Dynasty of Egypt and was prepared for Queen Tyti. A dedicatory inscription presents the construction of the tomb as a gift of the king to its owner; because a second cartouche is absent, however, that inscription alone does not securely establish the dynasty to which the tomb belongs. The tomb was cut into a sloping bed of greyish marl with flint, similar to the rock of the neighbouring burials. During the Third Intermediate Period, a pit for a later burial was dug in one of the side chambers, and the tomb was subsequently reused again in the Roman period.

The tomb was also robbed during the Ramesside period, as recorded in the papyrus BM EA 10052. Among the thieves' statements is the testimony of a man called Nesamun, also known as Tjaybay, concerning the looting of a queen's burial whose name, in the surviving remains of the document, has been read as "Tyti".

=== Excavations ===
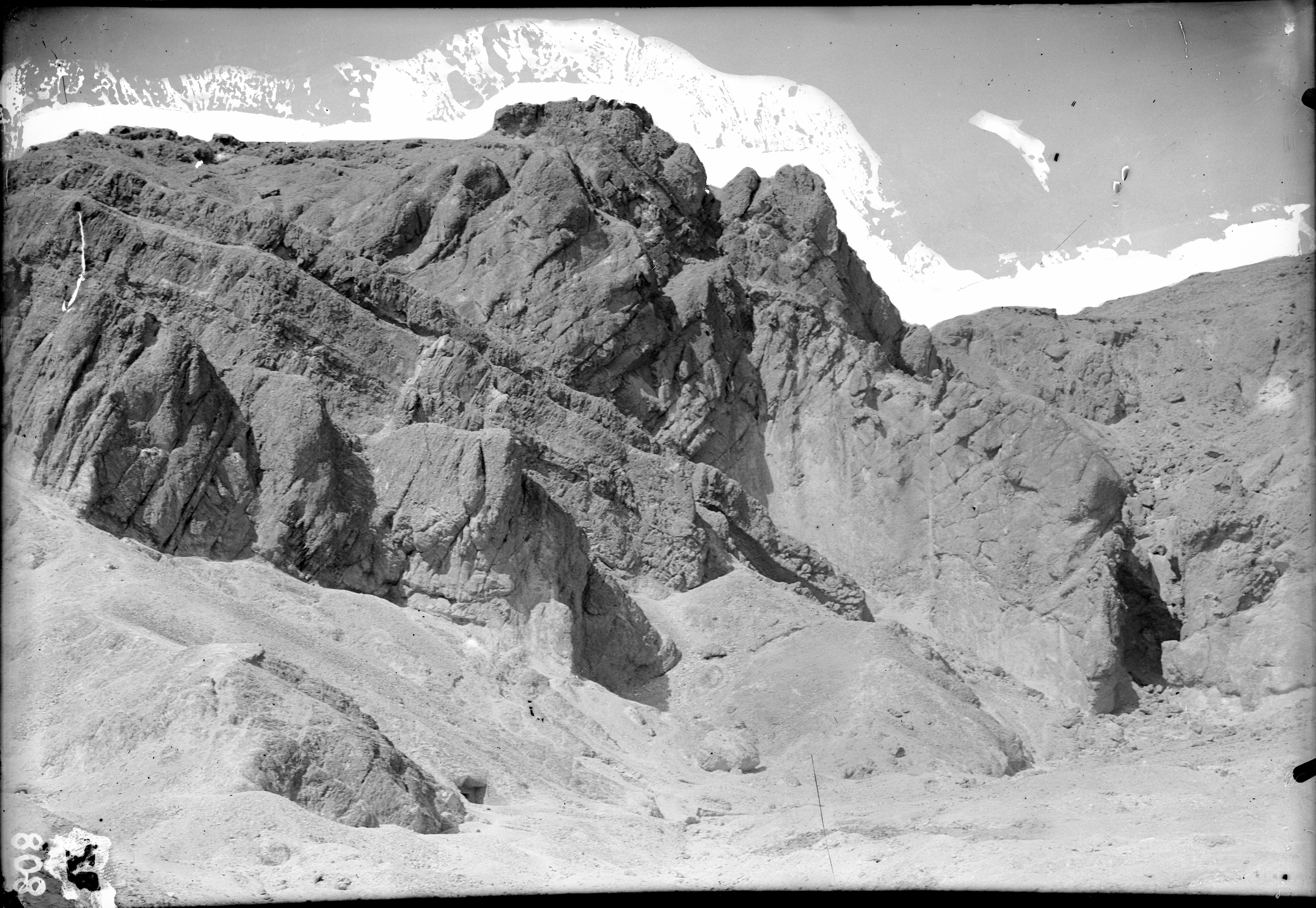
View of the final part of the Valley of the Queens, with the entrance to tomb QV52 visible below; Schiaparelli excavations, 1903–1905, silver bromide glass negative, Photographic Archive of the Museo Egizio, Turin (C00808).

The tomb had been accessible since the beginning of the nineteenth century. The first recorded visitor was Jean-Jacques Rifaud, followed by Giovanni Battista Belzoni in 1816, Robert Hay in 1826, who numbered it tomb 2, John Gardner Wilkinson in 1828, who numbered it tomb 12, Jean-François Champollion in 1828–1829, who numbered it tomb 3, Karl Richard Lepsius in 1844–1845, who numbered it tomb 9, and Heinrich Karl Brugsch in 1854. In 1893 Georges Bénédite studied the inscriptions of the tomb and published a monograph on QV52, Le tombeau de la reine Thiti; in 1903–1904 the Italian mission of Ernesto Schiaparelli excavated the tomb, which was later examined in 1994 by the Franco-Egyptian mission of the CNRS and the Egyptian Supreme Council of Antiquities. QV52 was one of the first tombs in the valley to be systematically recorded by Francesco Ballerini, with plans and hieroglyphic texts, in his excavation notebook of 1903. On 17 February that year the first Mass inside the tomb was celebrated there, blessed by one of the Franciscan fathers of Luxor; Ballerini described in a letter to his family how an altar was set up in contrast to the images of Egyptian deities on the walls. The Photographic Archive of the Museo Egizio in Turin preserves a series of photographs from 1903 documenting the spaces and decoration of QV52 during Schiaparelli's excavations.

Between 2006 and 2008 the joint mission of the Getty Conservation Institute and the Egyptian Supreme Council of Antiquities also worked in the tomb. Its task was to examine the condition of the Valley of the Queens, plan the necessary conservation work and study the painted plasters in the royal tombs of the valley.

== Description ==
=== Exterior ===
The tomb lies on the southern side of the north-western branch of the main Valley of the Queens. It is oriented from south-west to north-east, unlike QV51 but like QV53 and QV55; the entrance is preceded by an access ramp. In 2016 the tomb was open to visitors: the entrance was closed by a steel door, while wooden flooring, artificial lighting and glass barriers along the decorated walls had been installed inside.

=== Interior ===
==== Structure ====
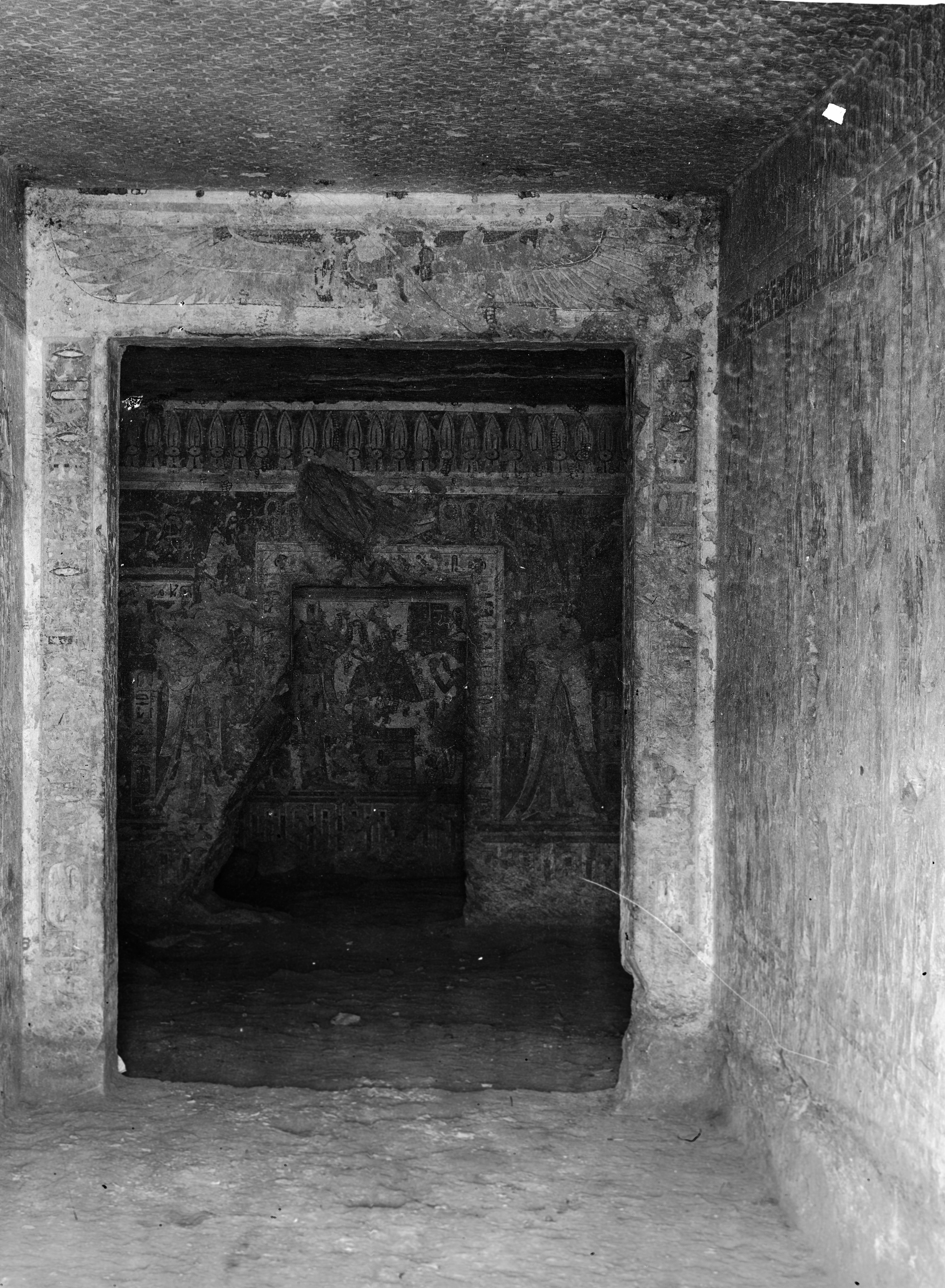
Interior view of QV52, from the vestibule towards the burial chamber; the rear annex is visible in the background. Photograph of 1903, Photographic Archive of the Museo Egizio, Turin (C01874).

A ramp leads through a narrow corridor to the burial chamber, from which a small rear chamber opens on the main axis. Two side chambers open from the burial chamber and lie along a north-west to south-east axis. In the floor of one of the side chambers a shaft opens into a pit. The tomb therefore consists of a corridor leading into a large chamber, which in turn communicates with three smaller chambers; the arrangement of these three small rooms gives the plan the form of a Latin cross. The burial chamber connects the access corridor, the two side chambers and the rear chamber, from which the spaces are arranged along two principal axes.

==== Decoration ====
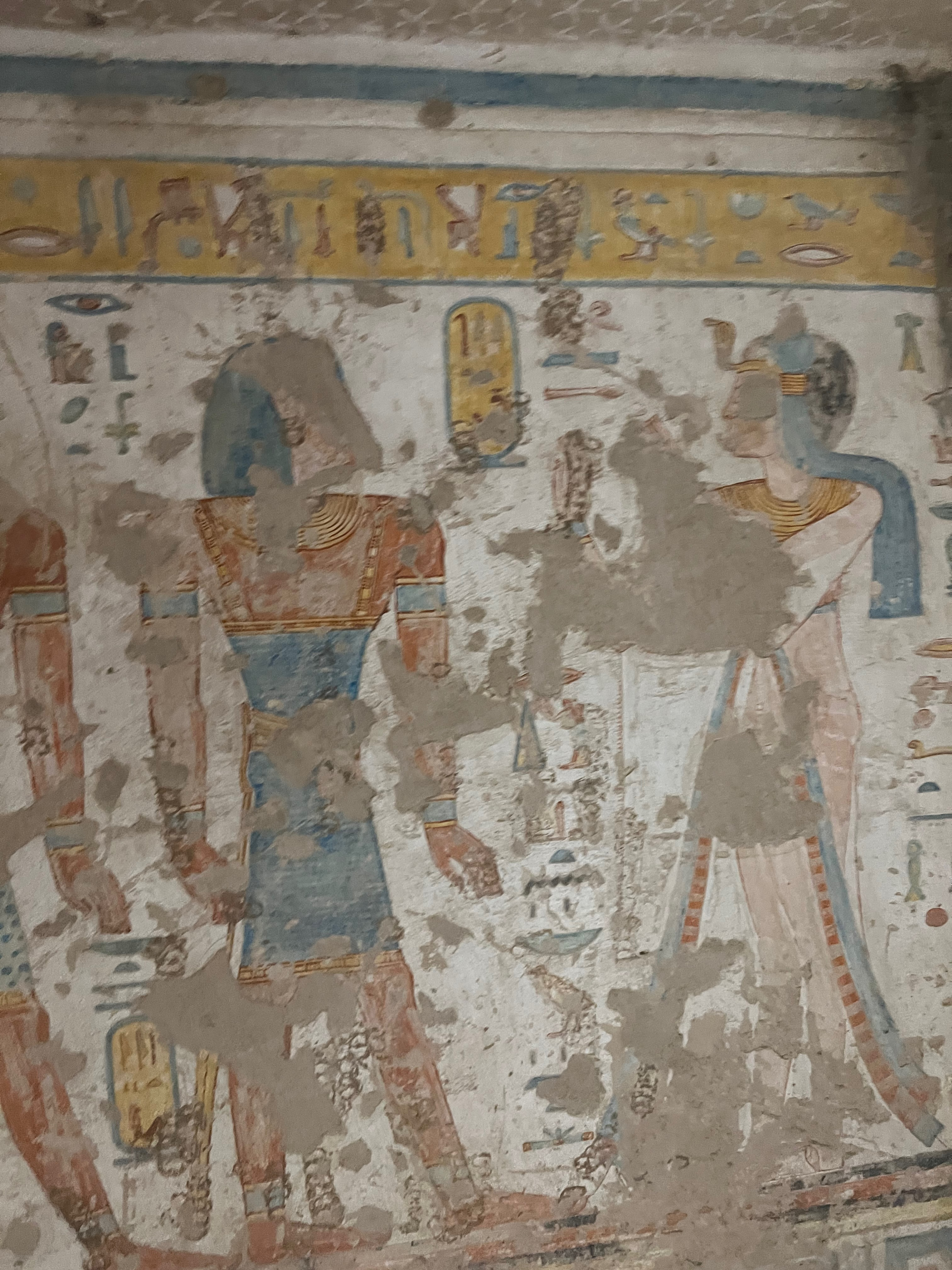
Painted plaster reliefs in QV52, showing Queen Tyti; Twentieth Dynasty, 12th century BC, Valley of the Queens.

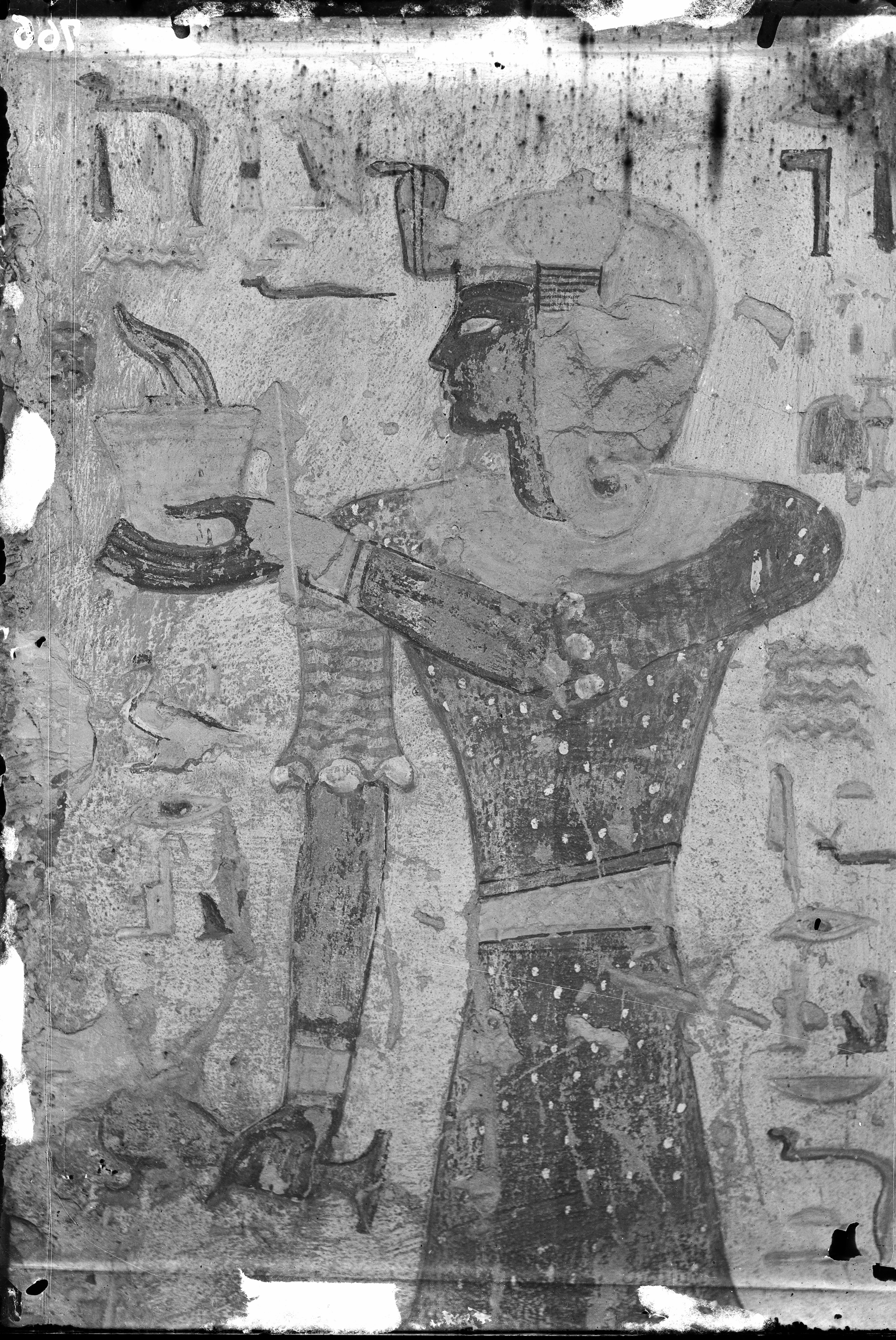
Wall to the left of the entrance to the burial chamber, with the god Iunmutef performing a libation; painted plaster relief, Twentieth Dynasty, tomb QV52, photograph of 1903, Photographic Archive of the Museo Egizio, Turin (C00766).

The rock into which the tomb was cut was of good quality and allowed precise stone cutting: the walls were made flat and regular, unlike those of many other tombs in the Valley of the Queens. Plaster was therefore used chiefly to fill cracks in the rock, and in most places only a very thin layer was needed to prepare the surface for painting. At the entrance, on the southern jamb of the doorway, the cutting of the rock was so fine that the paint was applied directly to the stone without a plaster layer. Numerous painted plaster reliefs survive in the tomb; the Getty report published in 2016 described them as worn, with faded colours, and also recorded the treatment of the paintings and the filling of losses with new plaster. On the ceiling painted with white stars, the relief technique and interrupted black construction lines are still visible; the horizontal ceiling of the corridor is decorated with stars traced on a white ground within a visible geometric grid.

The entrance corridor has little decoration, while the doorway of the tomb preserves traces of hymns addressed to the deceased queen; on the southern wall an vulture appears above a clump of papyrus of Lower Egypt. In the antechamber, after a seated winged goddess, Maat, three groups of images of the deceased appear: to the south are Ptah, Ra-Horakhty, Amset, Duamutef and Isis, while to the north are Thoth, Atum, Hapi, Qebehsenuef and Nephthys. In the front half of the corridor the deities placed opposite one another form pairs of related meaning: Ptah and Thoth point to the subterranean world, night and the afterlife, while Ra-Horakhty and Atum refer to the sun. In the rear half, by contrast, the figures evoke the protection of Osiris and of the dead queen through the Four sons of Horus, Isis and Nephthys, the sisters of Osiris. When the queen is shown before solar deities, she shakes the sistrum, a ritual gesture offered to the gods that also links her to the goddess Hathor, mother, wife and daughter of the sun god.

Serket and Neith decorate the inner thickness of the doorway to the sarcophagus chamber. The decoration of the sarcophagus chamber includes images of deities also found in the tombs of other queens; protective figures are shown on the two halves of the eastern wall, on either side of the doorway. Among the gods are the pair Hery-maat, connected with the solar rebirth of the buried queens, and Nebneru, whose name means "Lord of Terror". The side walls of the doorways leading to the annexes are decorated with numerous protective guardians, arranged in a sequence close to that of chapters 145–146 of the Book of the Dead; the triad of monkeys also appears on the side walls. On the western wall the deceased appears on both sides of the door leading to the rear chamber, offering gifts to the Four Sons of Horus, with Amset and Duamutef to the south and Hapi and Qebehsenuef to the north. Above this scene are the two solar barques of the sun god, the day barque and the night barque, by which the god crosses the sky and the underworld, evoking the solar rebirth of the queen. The eight panels of the central hall indicate the stages of the journey through the afterlife, from entry into the realm of Osiris to the return to light with the sun.

The burial chamber presents images of deities on the doorways and has the deceased's journey through the afterlife as its main theme; the side chambers shift the scene into the Duat, the Egyptian underworld. In one side chamber, the walls show gods of the underworld, the canopic jars and the souls of Pe and Nekhen. On the rear wall the deceased worships two forms of Hathor: first a human-shaped tree goddess rising from the top of a sycamore and pouring cool water for the queen, then a cow appearing from the mountains of the West. In the other side chamber the walls are decorated with paired scenes, almost identical and simply composed, each showing the queen offering gifts to the Four Sons of Horus; on the rear wall the deceased is shown before Osiris. In both chambers the queen appears on the walls immediately to the left and right of the doorway in the costume of the Egyptian Iunmutef priest, offering water to the gods in a rite of libation. In the rear chamber, finally, the deceased stands to the left and right of the doorway before numerous seated deities along the side walls; on the rear wall Osiris occupies the centre of the scene, visible through the doorways aligned on the central axis of the tomb. Osiris sits on a throne and is surrounded by Thoth, Nephthys, Neith and Serket, deities who assist him and protect his rebirth in the afterlife. The inner chambers are therefore directly connected with the afterlife and represent the place where the deceased joins the resurrected Osiris.

Photographs from the Italian mission of 1903–1905 directed by Ernesto Schiaparelli. Photographic Archive of the Museo Egizio, Turin

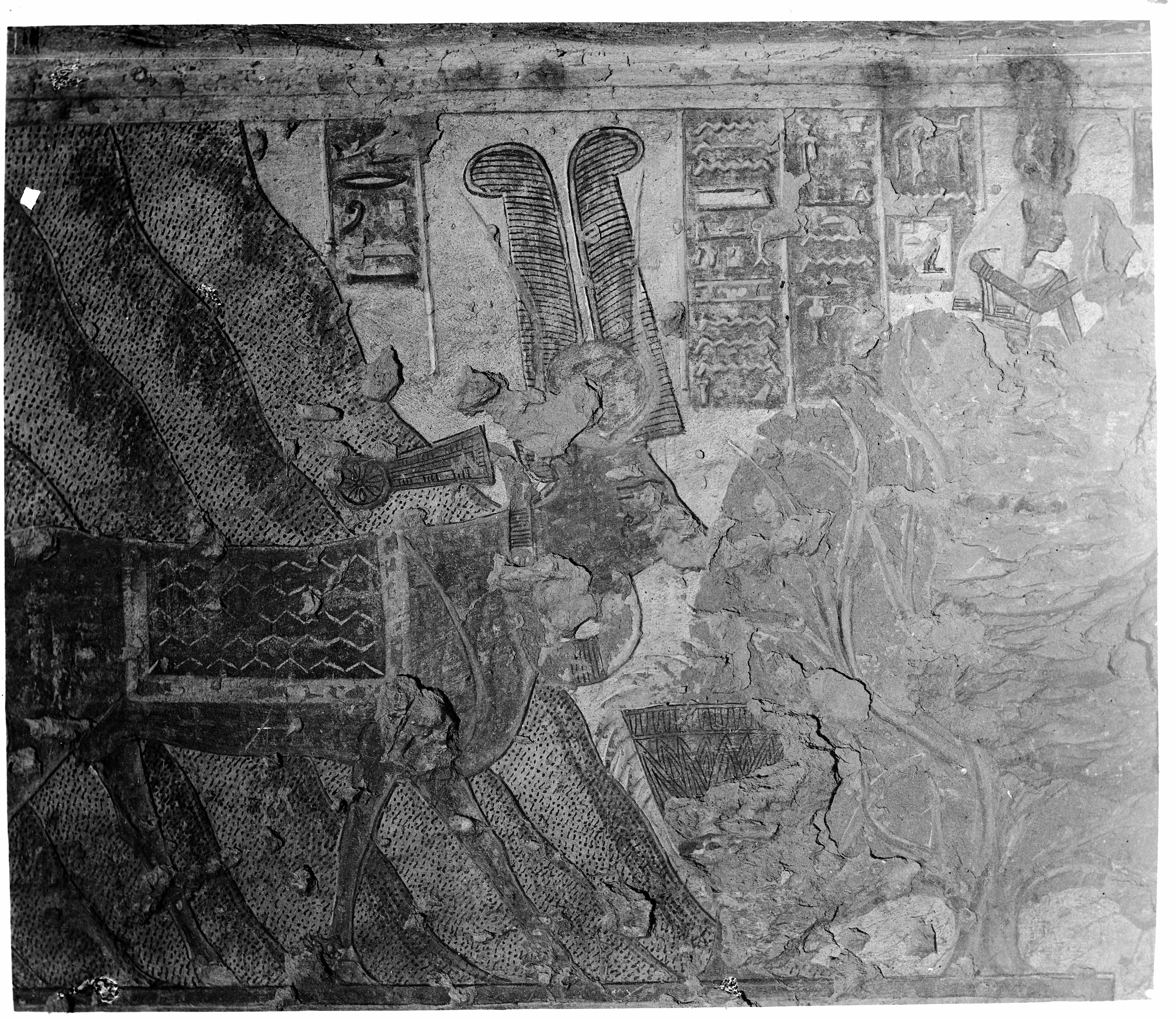
Wall representation of the goddess Hathor in animal form, from the eastern annex of the tomb of Queen Tyti; painted plaster relief, Twentieth Dynasty, tomb QV52, photograph of 1903 (C01872).

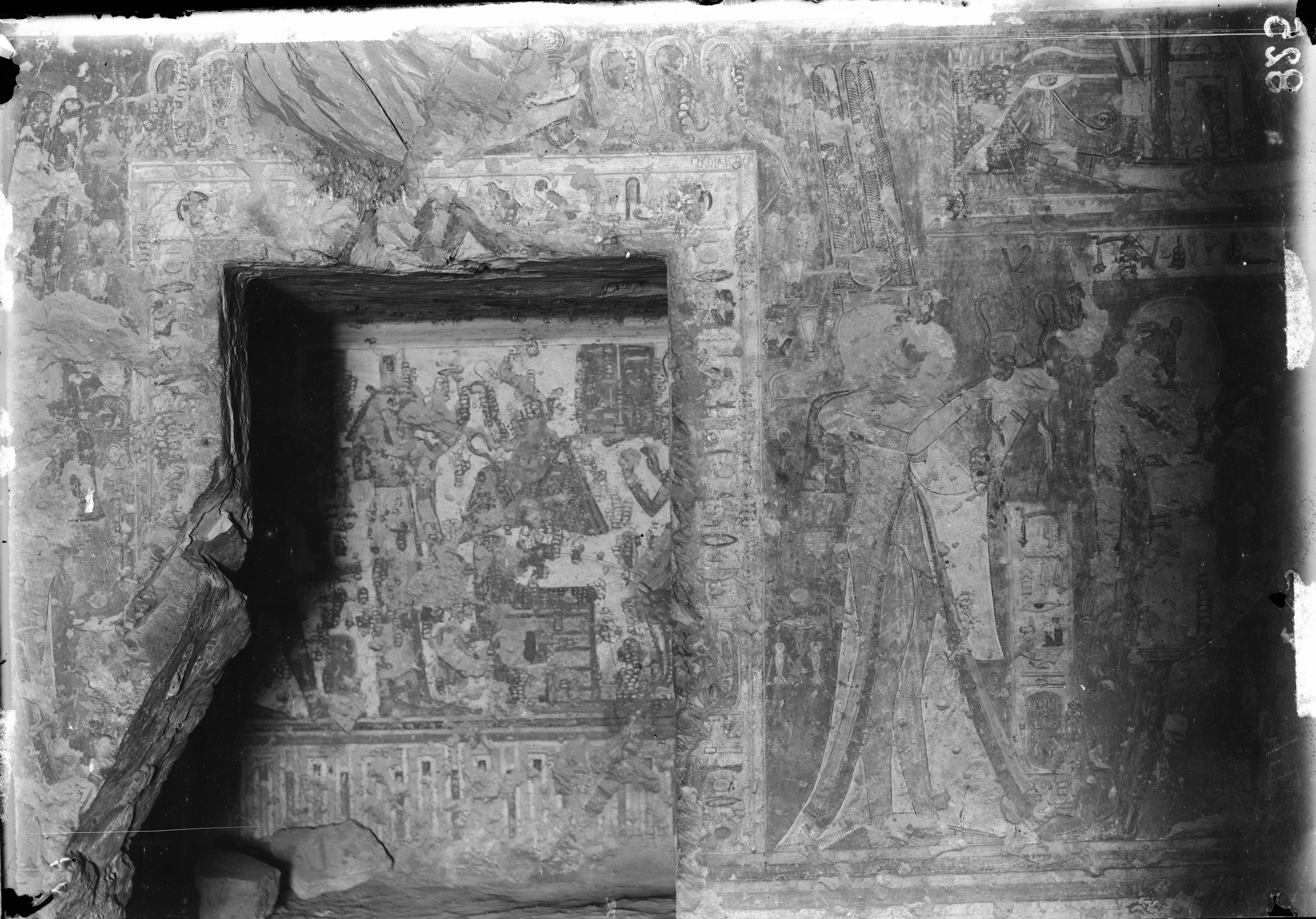
Rear wall of the burial chamber, from which the rear annex is entered; painted plaster reliefs, Twentieth Dynasty, tomb QV52, photograph of 1903 (C00825).

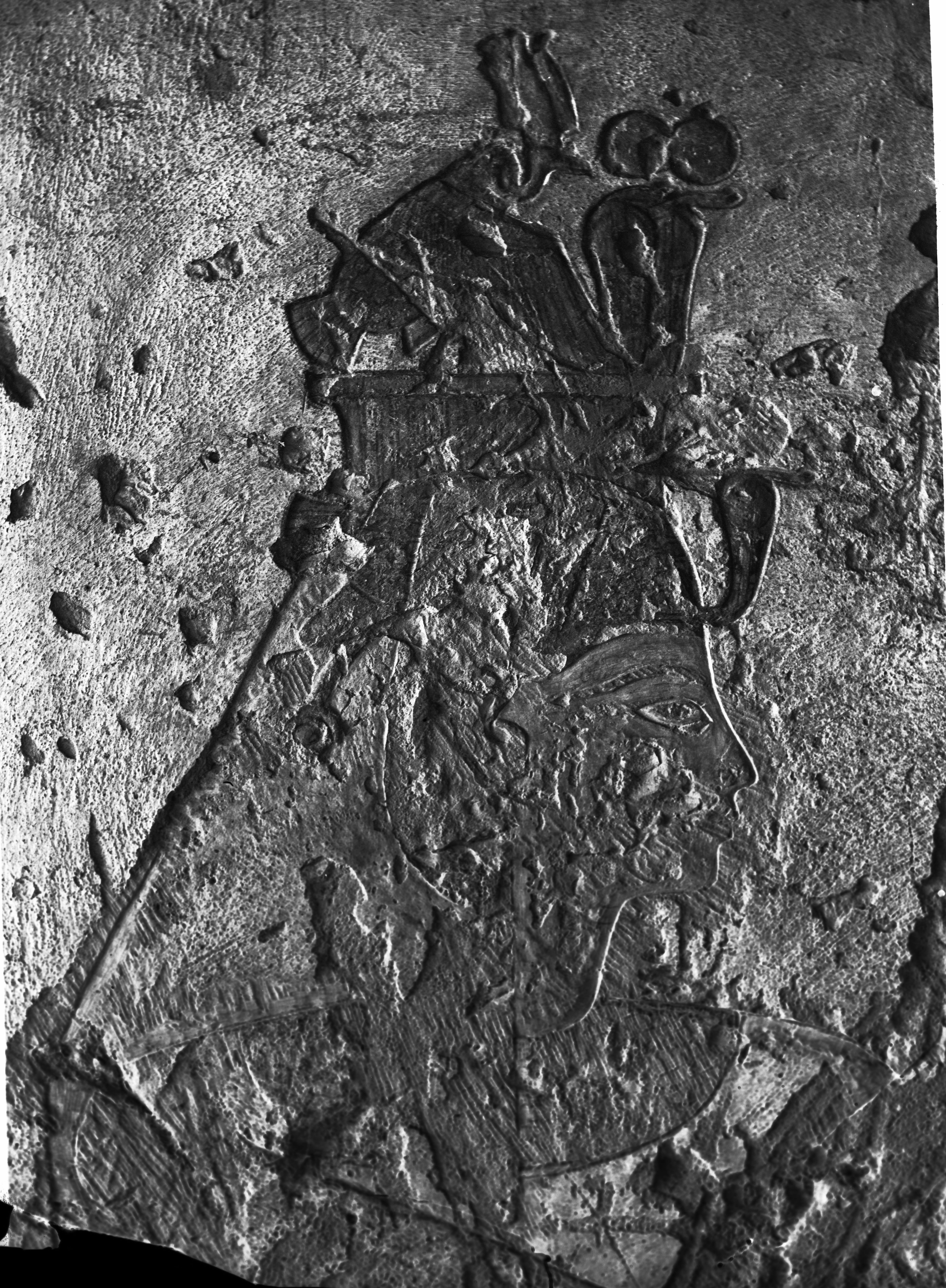
Fragmentary representation of Queen Tyti in the inner corridor, worshipping Amset, Duamutef and Isis; painted plaster relief, Twentieth Dynasty, tomb QV52, photograph of 1903 (C01875).

=== Finds ===
Among the objects found in the tomb were thirty-four fragments of the queen's granite sarcophagus and its lid, some decorated or inscribed, three of which are preserved in the Museo Egizio in Turin. The finds also included three painted and inscribed alabaster fragments from canopic jars, the lid of a container and numerous pottery sherds, three of them with hieratic inscriptions. Some of this material dates to the Third Intermediate Period and to the Roman period.

== See also ==
- Theban Necropolis
- Ramesses III
- Ramesses IV
- Tyti
- Valley of the Queens

== Sources ==
- Bénédite, Georges (1894). "Le tombeau de la reine Thiti". Mémoires publiés par les membres de la Mission archéologique française au Caire (in French). 5 (3). Paris: Ernest Leroux: 381–412.
- Collier, Mark; Dodson, Aidan; Hamernik, Gottfried (2010). "P. BM EA 10052, Anthony Harris, and Queen Tyti" (PDF). The Journal of Egyptian Archaeology. 96 (1). London: Egypt Exploration Society: 242–247. doi:10.1177/030751331009600119. ISSN 0307-5133.
- Del Vesco, Paolo; Moiso, Beppe, eds. (2017). Missione Egitto 1903-1920. L'avventura archeologica M.A.I. raccontata (in Italian). Modena: Franco Cosimo Panini. ISBN 978-88-570-1265-0.
- Demas, Martha; Agnew, Neville, eds. (2012). Valley of the Queens Assessment Report, Volume 1: Conservation and Management Planning (PDF). Los Angeles: Getty Conservation Institute. ISBN 978-1-937433-40-6.
- Demas, Martha; Agnew, Neville, eds. (2016). Valley of the Queens Assessment Report, Volume 2: Assessment of 18th, 19th, and 20th Dynasty Tombs (PDF). Los Angeles: Getty Conservation Institute. ISBN 978-1-937433-36-9.
- Porter, Bertha; Moss, Rosalind L. B. (1964). Topographical Bibliography of Ancient Egyptian Hieroglyphic Texts, Reliefs, and Paintings. I. The Theban Necropolis. Part 2. Royal Tombs and Smaller Cemeteries (PDF) (2nd revised and augmented ed.). Oxford: Clarendon Press.
- Wong, Lori; Rickerby, Stephen; Rava, Amarilli; Sharkawi, Alaa El-Din M. (2012). "Developing approaches for conserving painted plasters in the royal tombs of the Valley of the Queens" (PDF). Terra 2012: 11th International Conference on the Study and Conservation of Earthen Architectural Heritage. pp. 324–330.
