= QV51 =

Ancient Egyptian tomb in the Valley of the Queens

Theban tomb Tomb of Isis
- Burial site of Isis
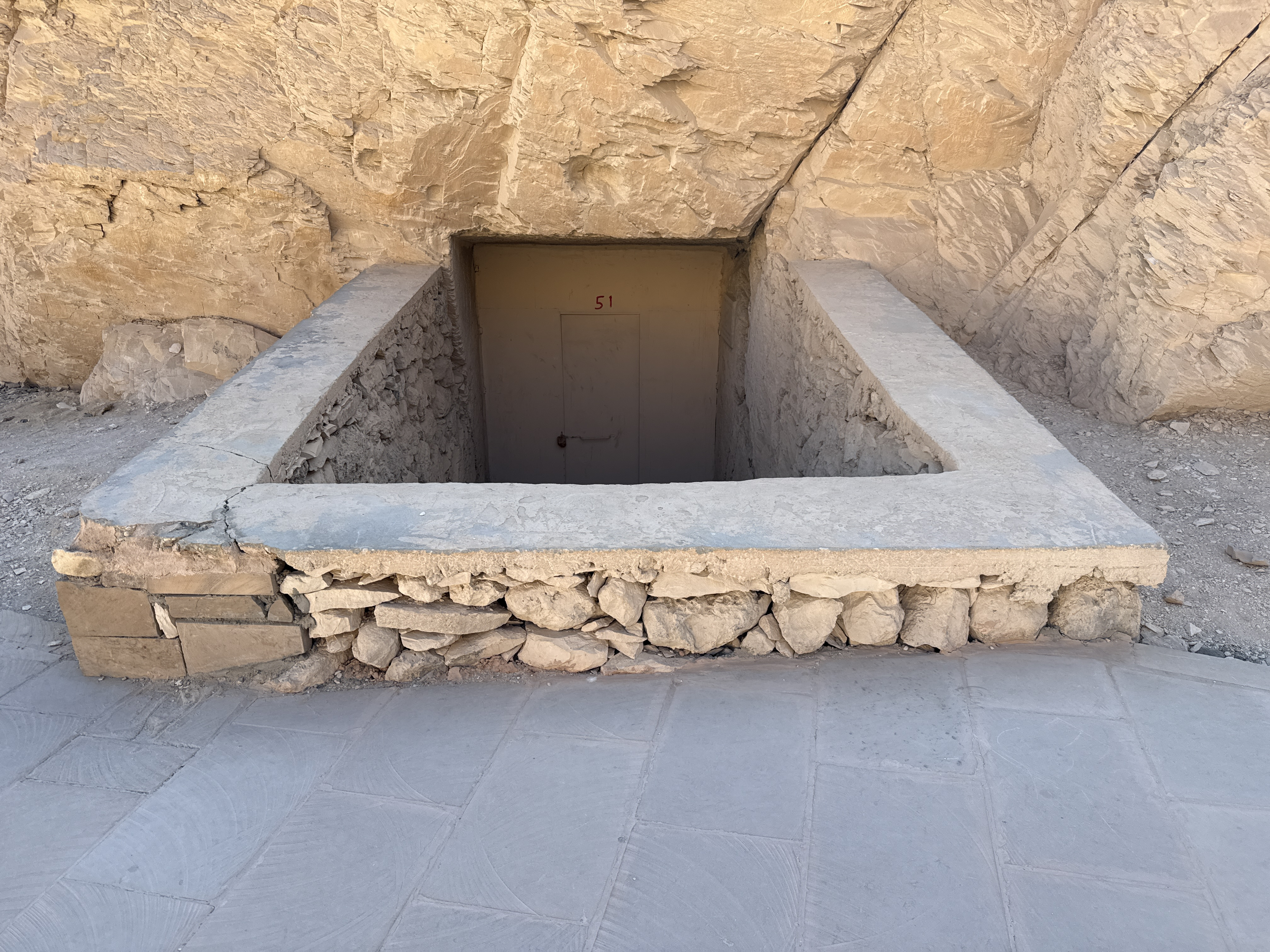
- Entrance to tomb QV51

- Coordinates: 25.7274798°N 32.5924963°E
- Location: Valley of the Queens, Theban Necropolis, Theban Necropolis
- Discovered: c. 1826
- Excavated by: Ernesto Schiaparelli (1903–1904)
- Decoration: Painted plaster reliefs
- Layout: Ramp, corridor, burial chamber, unfinished rear chamber and two side chambers
- ← Previous; QV50 Next → QV52

The tomb of Isis, also known by the designation QV51, is a tomb in the Valley of the Queens, in the Theban Necropolis, on the west bank of the Nile opposite Luxor, Egypt. It was cut for Queen Isis, wife of Ramesses III and mother of Ramesses VI.

The tomb preserves painted and relief plaster decoration devoted to the queen's funerary journey and to her encounter with several deities, including Ptah-Sokar, Atum and Osiris. QV51 is considered one of the last tombs made in the Valley of the Queens. The burial was violated in antiquity and is mentioned in the records concerning tomb robberies at Thebes during the Twentieth Dynasty of Egypt.

== Owner ==
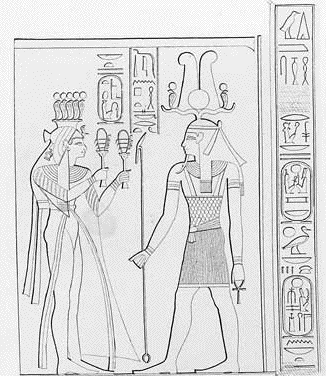
Queen Isis before Ptah-Sokar, from Denkmäler aus Aegypten und Aethiopien by Karl Richard Lepsius, 1849–1859.

The owner of the tomb was Queen Isis, also known as Iset Ta-Hemdjert, wife of Ramesses III and mother of Ramesses VI. The construction of the tomb may have begun during the reign of Ramesses III, but its decoration and fitting out were probably completed during the reign of his son Ramesses VI. The name of Ramesses VI appears in the text on the doorway of the burial chamber, a feature that led Ernesto Schiaparelli to regard QV51 as one of the last tombs made in the Valley of the Queens.

== History ==
The tomb was prepared during the Twentieth Dynasty of Egypt and belongs to the final phase of the royal use of the Valley of the Queens. The burial of Isis was opened at least once in year 17 of Ramesses IX: the inspectors declared it intact, while a later inspection dates to the reign of Ramesses XI, during the inquiries ordered by the viziers after the tomb-robbery scandal at the end of the dynasty. The tomb was nevertheless plundered not long after the queen's burial, as indicated by the archaeological evidence and by the Ramesside tomb-robbery records.

=== Excavations ===
The tomb was already accessible in the time of Robert Hay, who documented it in 1826; it was later recorded by John Gardner Wilkinson in 1828, by the Franco-Tuscan expedition of Jean-François Champollion in 1828–1829, by Karl Richard Lepsius in 1844–1845 and by Heinrich Karl Brugsch in 1854. The Italian mission of Ernesto Schiaparelli cleared the tomb of debris during its work in the Valley of the Queens in 1903–1905. The corridor of the tomb was photographed in 1904 during the excavations of the Italian mission.

During the twentieth century QV51 was the subject of further work: a campaign by the Egyptian Supreme Council of Antiquities in 1968, photographs by the Centre d'Étude et de Documentation sur l'Ancienne Égypte in the 1970s, mapping in 1981, work by the Franco-Egyptian mission in 1986, investigations and excavations by the CNRS in 1988–1989, epigraphic studies in 1992–1993 and a new clearance of the tomb in 2008. Between 2006 and 2008 the joint mission of the Getty Conservation Institute and the Egyptian Supreme Council of Antiquities also worked there, as part of a project to examine the state of conservation of the Valley of the Queens and to study the painted plasters in the royal tombs of the valley.

== Description ==
=== Exterior ===
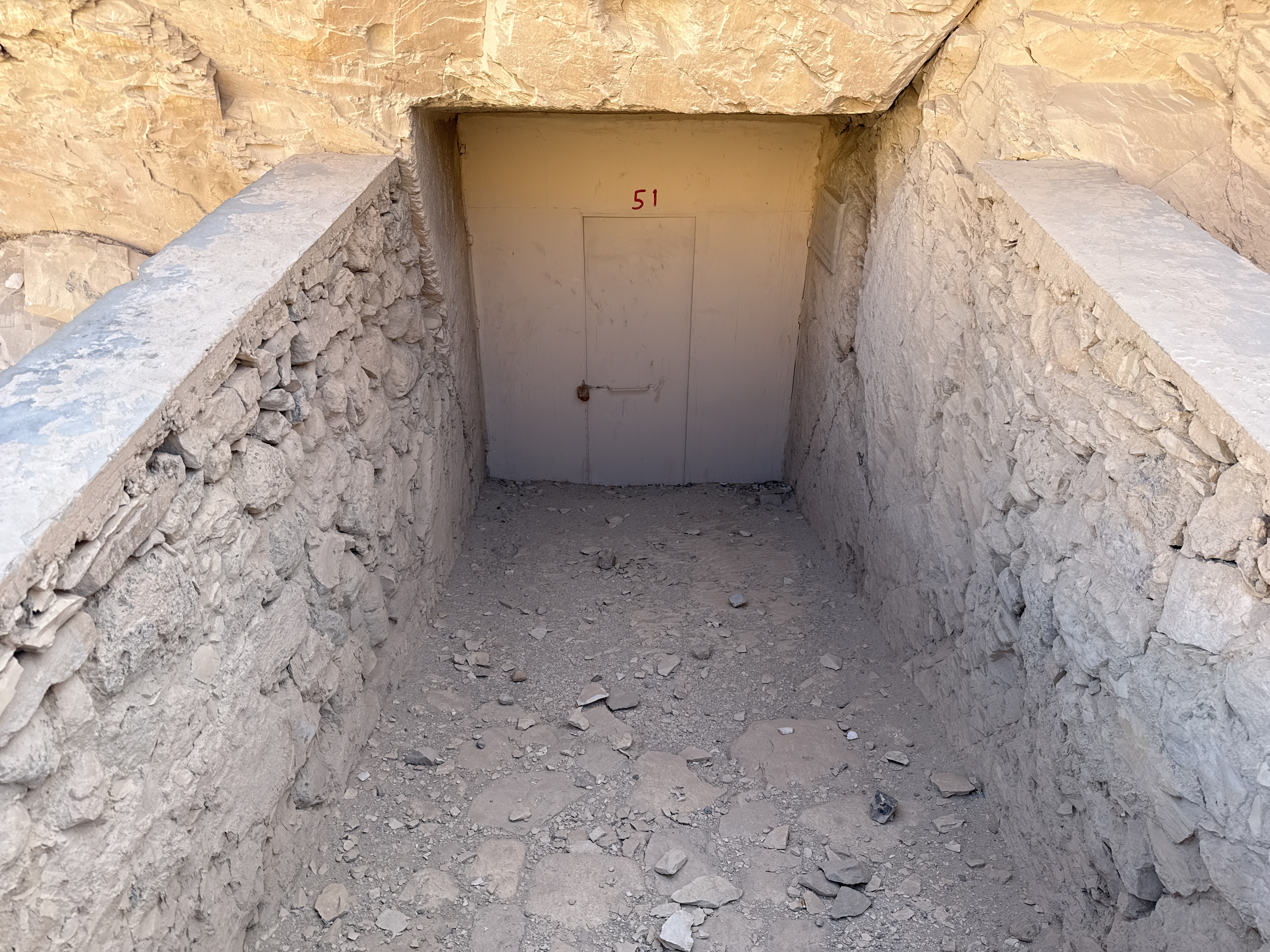
Entrance to tomb QV51, Twentieth Dynasty of Egypt, Valley of the Queens.

Tomb QV51 lies along the southern side of the north-western branch of the main Valley of the Queens. Its approximately north–south orientation distinguishes it from the nearby tombs QV52, QV53 and QV55. Access is through a ramp cut into the slope, leading to the inner corridor. The tomb is not listed as open to visitors, but appears heavily restored and fitted out as though prepared for possible opening; the entrance is closed by a metal door and is surrounded by modern masonry with a concrete roof.

=== Interior ===
==== Structure ====
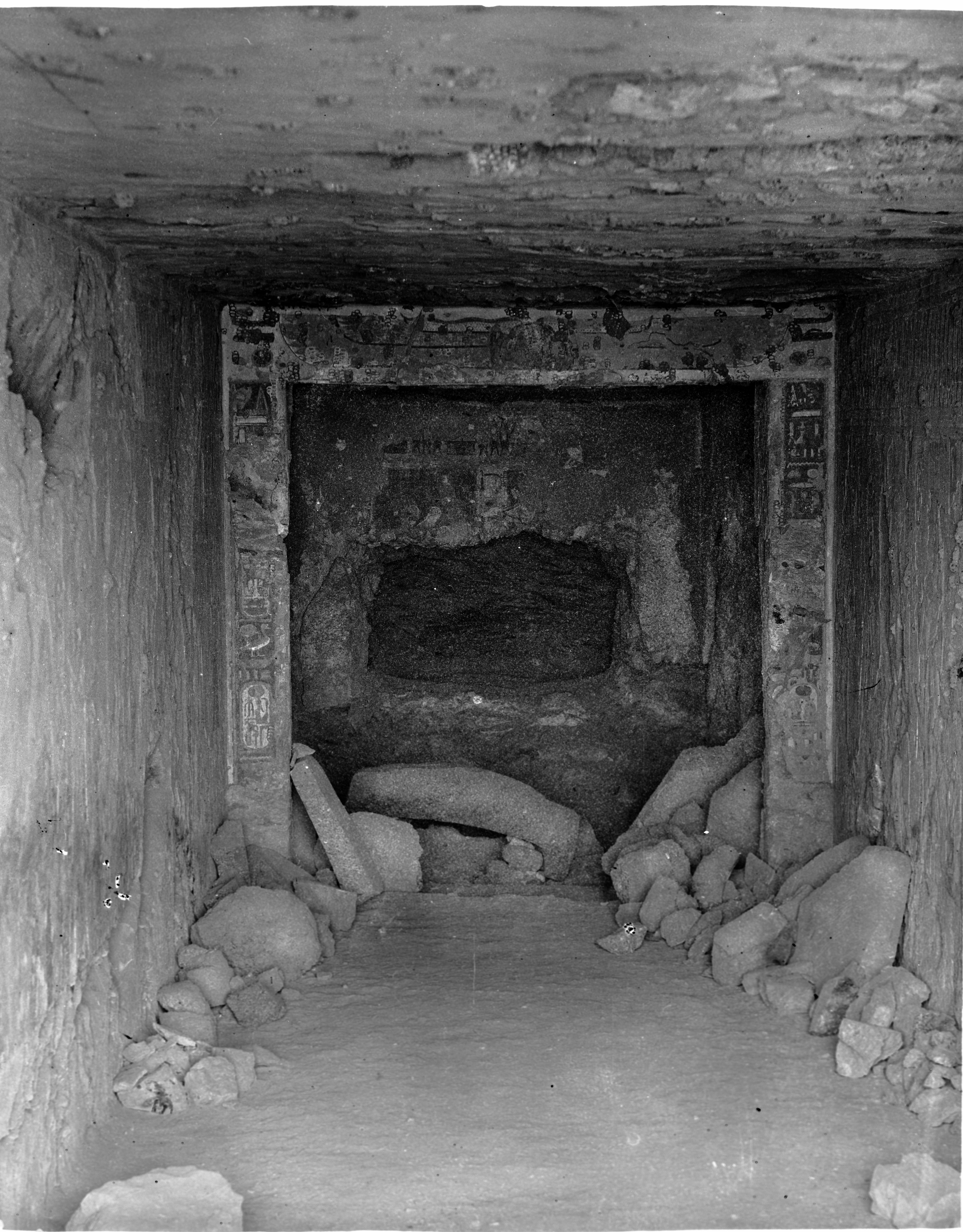
Corridor of the tomb of Queen Isis; photograph from the Schiaparelli mission, 1904, photographic archive of the Museo Egizio, Turin (C01873).

The entrance ramp leads to a long corridor, which opens into the burial chamber; in the centre of the chamber a pit was cut for the sarcophagus. Behind the burial chamber is an unfinished rear chamber, while two side chambers open to the east and west of the main chamber. A shallow trench was also cut along the south wall of one of the side chambers. The walls of the corridor were cut straight and flat, showing the good quality of the rock in this part of the tomb; toward the rear, however, the quality of the bedrock deteriorates, and large voids were filled with pottery sherds and plaster.

==== Decoration ====
Fragments of painted relief plaster survive in the tomb, especially in the corridor and burial chamber. The corridor shows the queen before several deities, including Ptah-Sokar, Atum and Osiris. The ceiling of the corridor was left unfinished: only the north-eastern corner had been begun with a preliminary drawing in red. A text of Ramesses VI is placed on the outer jambs of the burial chamber.

In the burial chamber the queen appears before several deities, including Ptah, a falcon god, Anhur-Shu and Atum. The side chambers preserve a preliminary red drawing, without relief, and seem to have remained unfinished; the paintings appear more rapidly made and less refined than those in the corridor and burial chamber. On the eastern side of one of the side chambers there is also an area of rock that was not fully excavated. The side rooms are decorated with scenes that include several goddesses, among them Neith, Serket, Isis and Nephthys. The tomb has severe heat damage, but little blackening.

=== Finds ===
During Schiaparelli's excavations, fragments of the queen's red granite sarcophagus were found; they were later kept in the Museo Egizio in Turin.

== Sources ==
- Breasted, James Henry (1906). Ancient Records of Egypt. Volume IV: The Twentieth to the Twenty-Sixth Dynasties (PDF). Chicago: University of Chicago Press.
- Demas, Martha; Agnew, Neville, eds. (2012). Valley of the Queens Assessment Report, Volume 1: Conservation and Management Planning (PDF). Los Angeles: Getty Conservation Institute. ISBN 9781937433406.
- Demas, Martha; Agnew, Neville, eds. (2016). Valley of the Queens Assessment Report, Volume 2: Assessment of 18th, 19th, and 20th Dynasty Tombs (PDF). Los Angeles: Getty Conservation Institute. ISBN 9781937433369.
- Porter, Bertha; Moss, Rosalind L. B. (1964). Topographical Bibliography of Ancient Egyptian Hieroglyphic Texts, Reliefs, and Paintings. I. The Theban Necropolis. Part 2. Royal Tombs and Smaller Cemeteries (PDF) (2nd revised and augmented ed.). Oxford: Clarendon Press.
- Wong, Lori; Rickerby, Stephen; Rava, Amarilli; Sharkawi, Alaa El-Din M. (2012). "Developing approaches for conserving painted plasters in the royal tombs of the Valley of the Queens" (PDF). Terra 2012: 11th International Conference on the Study and Conservation of Earthen Architectural Heritage: 324–330.

== See also ==
- Iset Ta-Hemdjert
- Ramesses III
- Ramesses VI
- Theban Necropolis
- Valley of the Queens
