= QV88 =

Ancient Egyptian tomb in the Valley of the Queens

Theban tomb Tomb of Prince Ahmose
- Burial site of Prince Ahmose
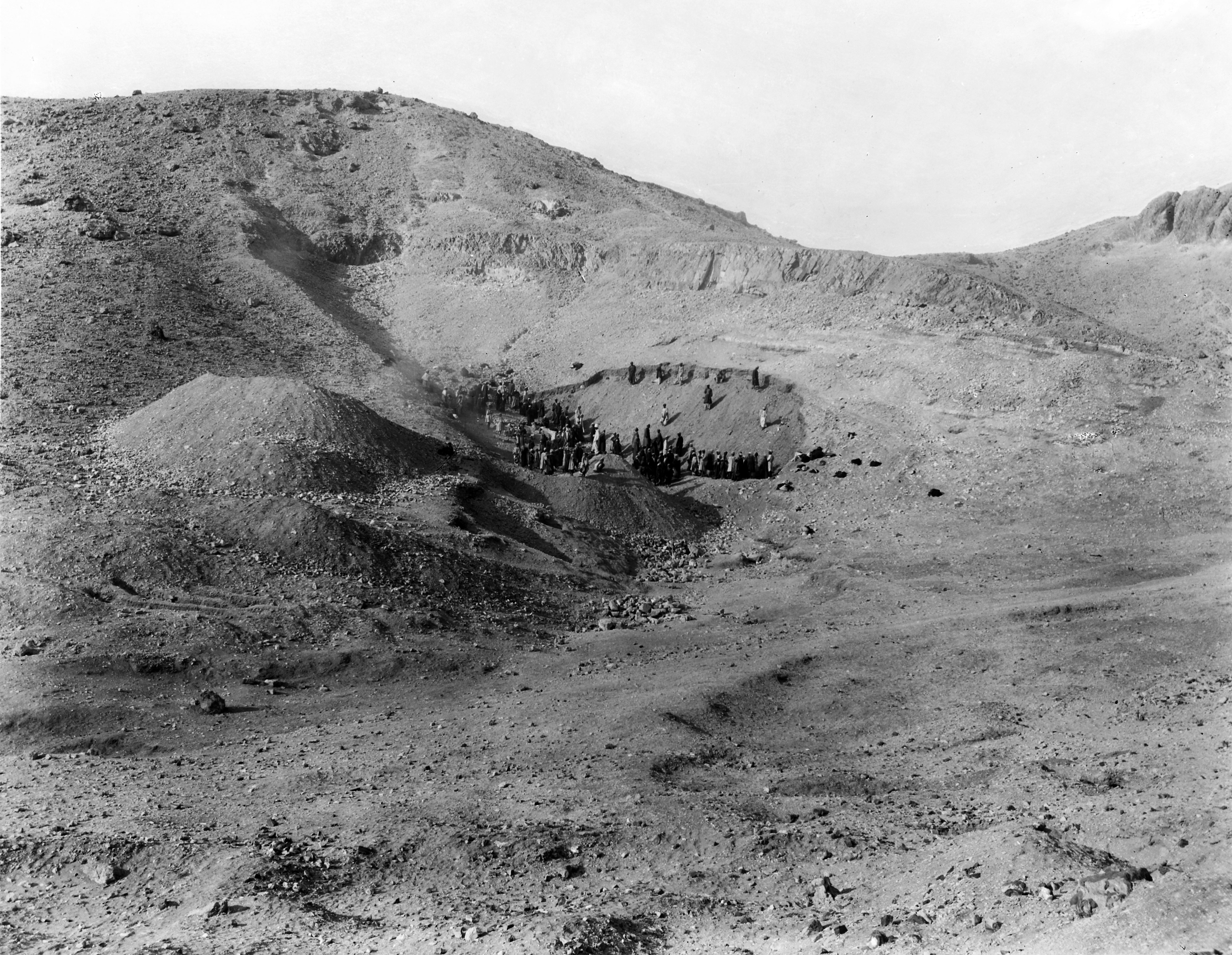
- Workers on the slope of the small valley during Schiaparelli's excavations, 1903; the entrances of QV88 and of the other tombs are not yet visible.

- Coordinates: 25.7270671°N 32.5938602°E
- Location: Valley of Prince Ahmose, Valley of the Queens, Theban Necropolis, Theban Necropolis
- Discovered: 1903
- Excavated by: Ernesto Schiaparelli, 1903
- Decoration: Undecorated
- Layout: Vertical shaft and burial chamber

The tomb of Prince Ahmose, also known as QV88, is an ancient Egyptian tomb in a subsidiary valley of the Valley of the Queens, known as the Valley of Prince Ahmose, in the Theban Necropolis on the west bank of the Nile opposite Luxor, Egypt. It was cut at the beginning of the Eighteenth Dynasty of Egypt for Ahmose, a mummified human fetus described as a "king's son".

The burial is significant because it preserves the memory of a very young member of the royal family at the beginning of the Eighteenth Dynasty, known through inscriptions on the funerary equipment. The title "king's son", however, does not establish whether the deceased was the son or grandson of a ruler, and his precise relationship to the royal family remains uncertain.

== Owner ==
The tomb was intended for Ahmose, a mummified human fetus whom the inscriptions on the canopic jars and ushabtis describe as a "king's son". The same inscriptions also give the names of his parents, Nebesu and Ian, who are not otherwise known; since the title "king's son" could also be given to a king's grandson, the relationship between Ahmose and the royal family at the beginning of the Eighteenth Dynasty cannot be defined with certainty. According to Schiaparelli, the mummy had been sprinkled with perfumed oil and wrapped in fine linen. In 2016 the mummified fetus was on display in the tomb of Amun-her-khepeshef (QV55).

== History ==
The burial belongs to the early Eighteenth Dynasty and forms part of the group of tombs cut in the side valleys of the Valley of the Queens. The branch in which QV88 lies took its name from the deceased and was recorded in archaeological documentation as the Valley of Prince Ahmose. Four other tombs were cut in the same sector, and their entrances are visible in the photographic documentation of the Italian mission after the work of 1903.

=== Excavations ===
The tomb was discovered in 1903 by the Italian mission directed by Ernesto Schiaparelli. The excavations brought to light the funerary equipment that allowed the deceased to be identified, together with the mummified body placed in a wooden box wrapped in linen. The tomb was later documented by the joint mission of the Getty Conservation Institute and the Egyptian Supreme Council of Antiquities between 2006 and 2008.

The photographic documentation of the Italian mission shows the clearing of the small valley and the transport of antiquities in the area of the tombs, where QV88 appears together with the nearby entrances.

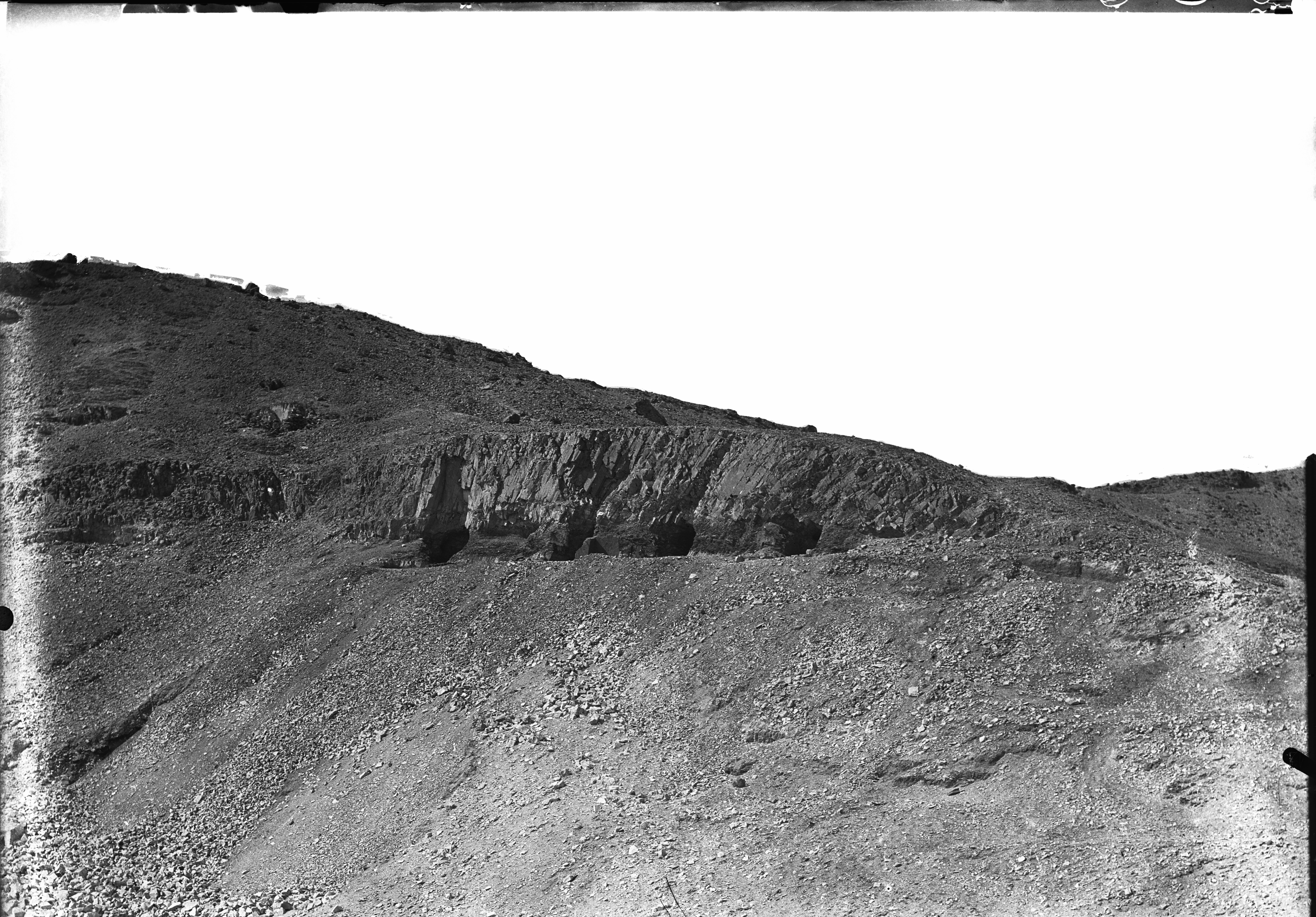
Result of the excavations in the sector of QV88; the entrances to the tomb and to four other burials are visible side by side. Schiaparelli excavations, 1903, Photographic Archive of the Museo Egizio, Turin (C00745).

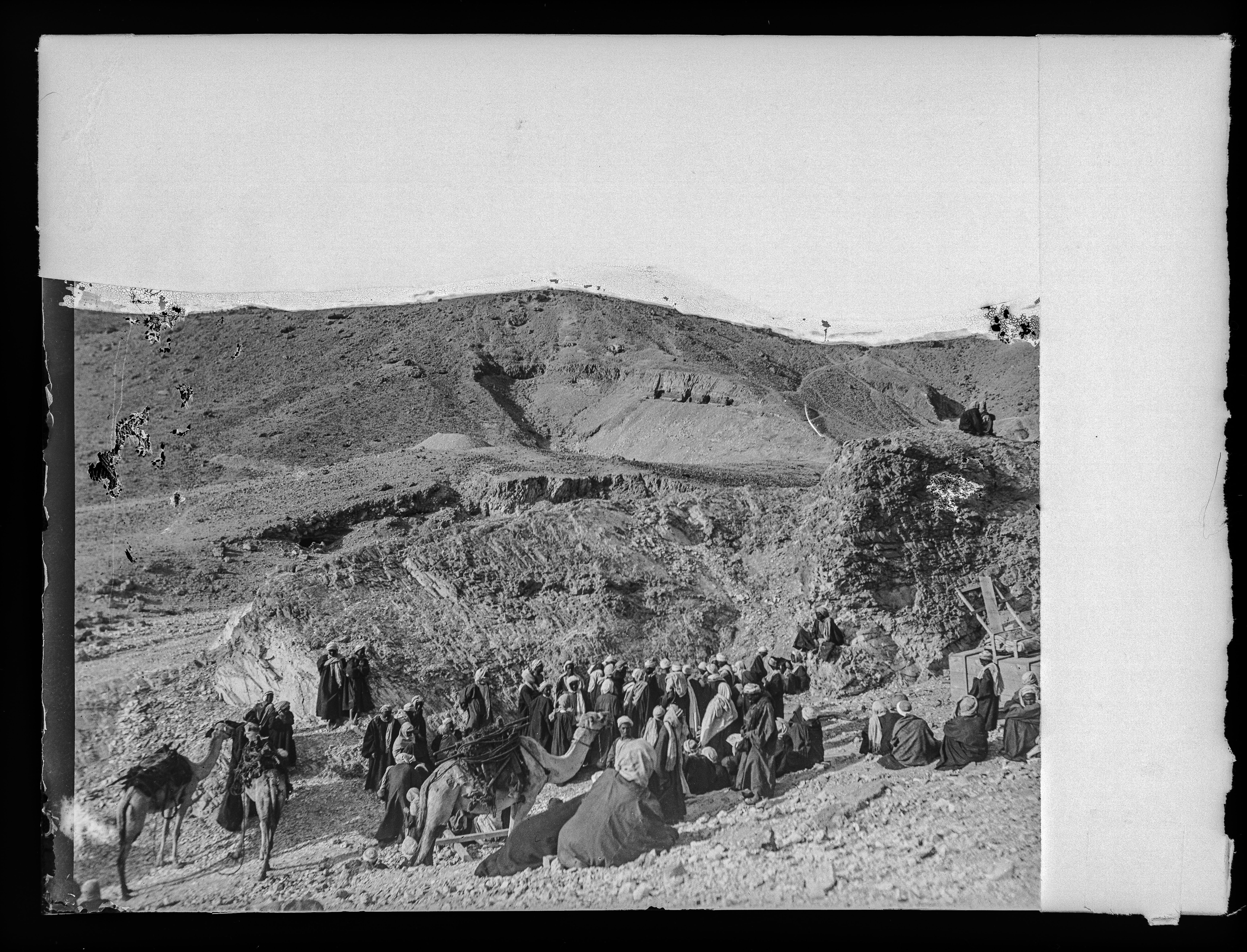
Group of Egyptian workers with camels during excavations in the Valley of the Queens, near the camp of the Italian mission; in the background are the entrances of four tombs in the same small valley. Schiaparelli excavations, 1903-1913, Photographic Archive of the Museo Egizio, Turin – Anthropology Museum of the University of Turin (FMMA1192).

== Description ==
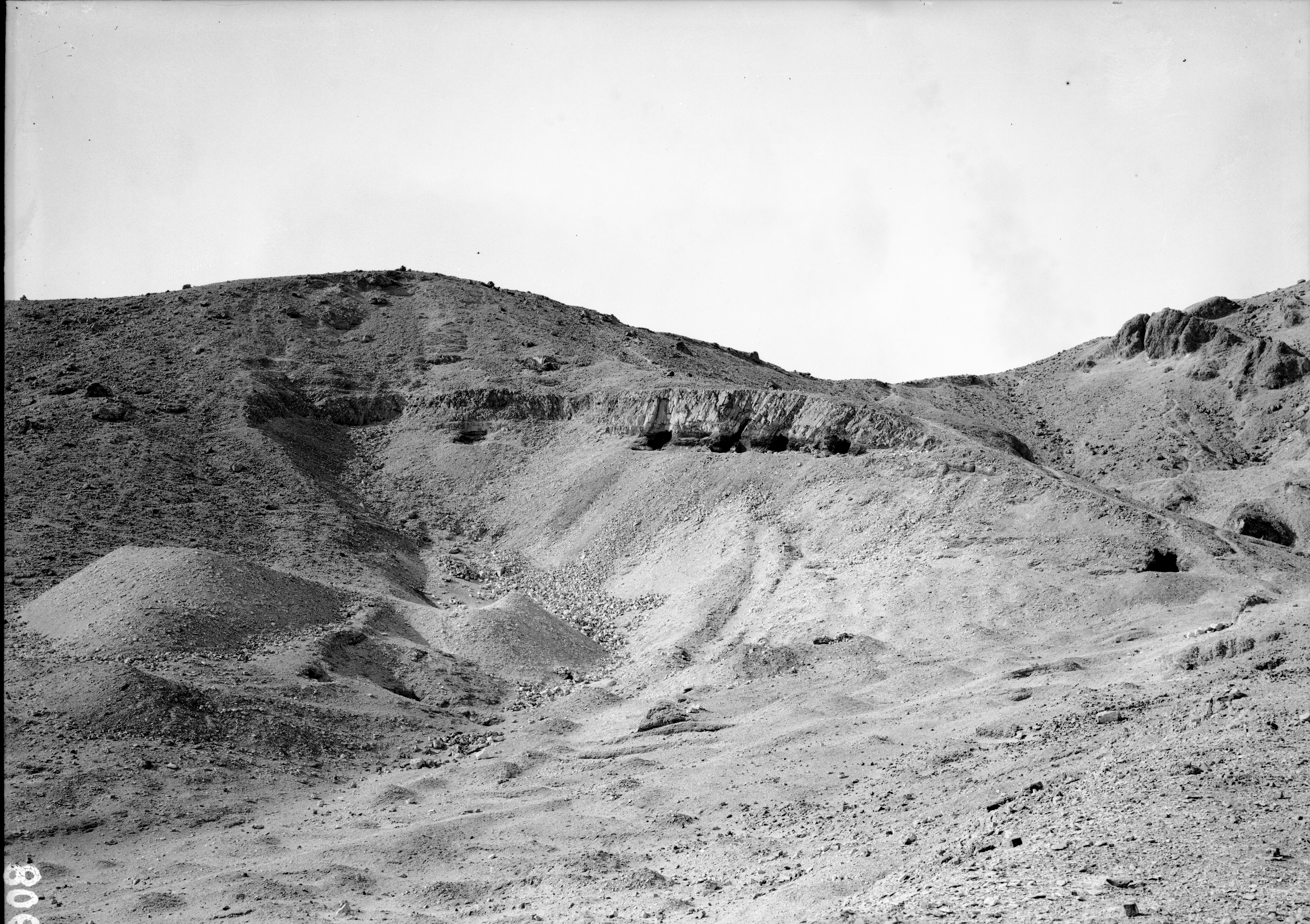
End of the small valley after the work of Schiaparelli's mission, in the sector of QV88. Schiaparelli excavations, 1903-1905, Photographic Archive of the Museo Egizio, Turin (C00806).

=== Exterior ===
QV88 is located in the Valley of Prince Ahmose, a side valley branching from the Valley of the Queens. The entrance is a vertical shaft cut into the bedrock of the small valley.

=== Interior ===
The tomb was cut into shale and consists of a heavily eroded vertical shaft, marked A in the plan, leading to a small undecorated burial chamber, marked B. Its plan is therefore limited to the access shaft and the burial chamber.

=== Finds ===
The material found in the tomb included fragments of mummy wrappings, alabaster and glass jars, two fragmentary inscribed canopic jars and inscribed fragments of ushabtis. The mummified body was placed in a wooden box wrapped in linen; according to Schiaparelli's description, it had been sprinkled with perfumed oil and wrapped in fine linen. In 2016 the fetus was on display in the tomb of Amun-her-khepeshef (QV55). The inscriptions on the canopic jars and ushabtis gave the name of Ahmose and those of his parents, Nebesu and Ian; the title "king's son", however, does not establish with certainty the relationship between the deceased and the royal family at the beginning of the Eighteenth Dynasty.

== Sources ==
- Demas, Martha; Agnew, Neville, eds. (2012). Valley of the Queens Assessment Report, Volume 1: Conservation and Management Planning (PDF). Los Angeles: Getty Conservation Institute. ISBN 9781937433406.
- Demas, Martha; Agnew, Neville, eds. (2016). Valley of the Queens Assessment Report, Volume 2: Assessment of 18th, 19th, and 20th Dynasty Tombs (PDF). Los Angeles: Getty Conservation Institute. ISBN 9781937433369.

== See also ==
- Theban Necropolis
- Amun-her-khepeshef (20th dynasty)
- Valley of the Queens
