= QV55 =

Ancient Egyptian tomb in the Valley of the Queens

Theban tomb QV55
- Burial site of Amun-her-khepeshef
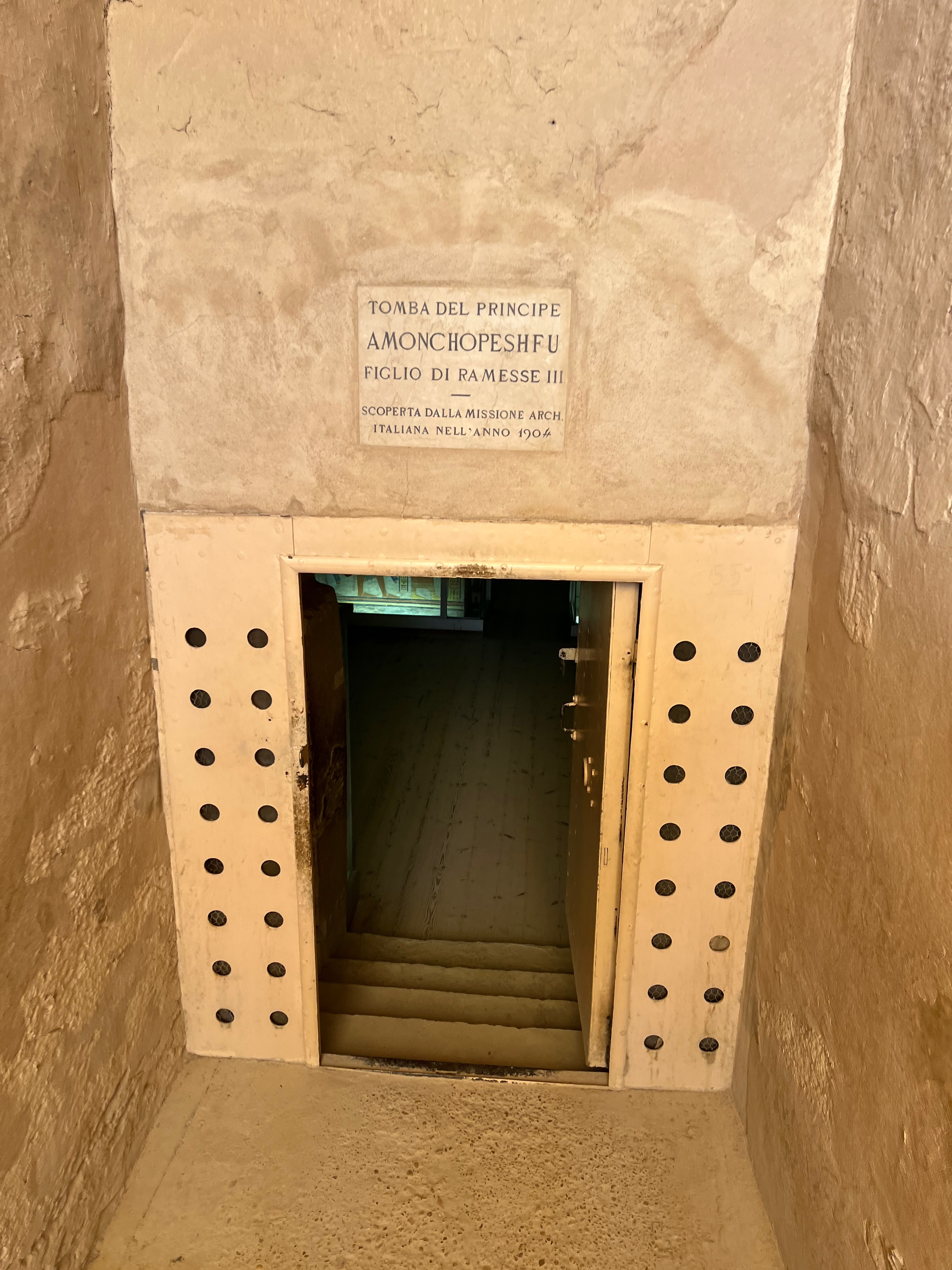
- Entrance to QV55

- Coordinates: 25.7277043°N 32.5919996°E
- Location: Valley of the Queens, Theban Necropolis, Theban Necropolis
- Discovered: 1904
- Excavated by: Ernesto Schiaparelli
- Decoration: Book of the Dead
- Layout: Northeast-southwest axis

QV55, also known as the tomb of Amun-her-khepeshef, is an ancient Egyptian tomb in the Valley of the Queens, in the Theban Necropolis, built for Prince Amun-her-khepeshef, a son of Ramesses III, and dated to the Twentieth Dynasty of Egypt.

== Owner ==
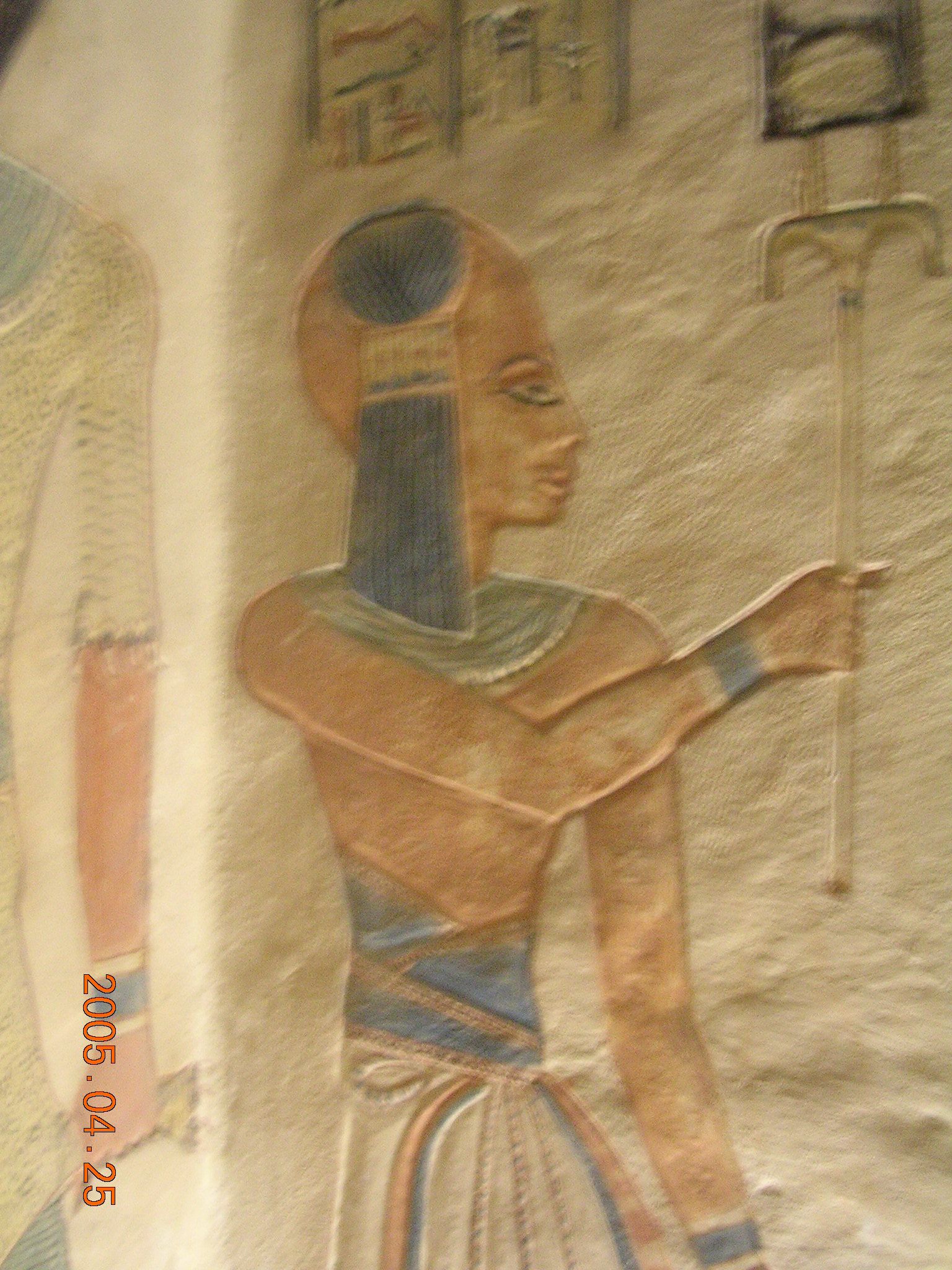
Portrait of Amun-her-khepeshef in QV55.

The owner of the tomb is Amun-her-khepeshef, a son of Ramesses III. A scene from the tomb shows the prince behind his father Ramesses III, who is led by the goddess Hathor. In the same scene, Amun-her-khepeshef wears the sidelock of youth, identified as a sign of youth. In the scenes of the antechamber and burial chamber, Ramesses III is the main figure and performs the offerings, while the prince appears as a secondary figure, shown as a child with the sidelock of youth.

== History ==
QV55 is attributed to Amenherkhepshef and is dated to the Twentieth Dynasty. The modern history of the tomb includes its discovery and photographic documentation by the Italian Archaeological Mission in 1904, the study by the Franco-Egyptian mission of the CNRS and the Supreme Council of Antiquities in 1988 and 1994, and the research, planning and conservation assessment activities carried out in the Valley of the Queens by the Getty Conservation Institute and the Supreme Council of Antiquities between 2006 and 2011. After the discovery, photographs were taken of the entrance, the antechamber, the burial chamber, the sarcophagus and the painted scenes; these photographs are preserved in the photographic archive of the Museo Egizio. QV55, QV52 and QV44 were recorded as lighted and open to visitors during observations of bat colonies carried out as part of the conservation assessment of the Valley of the Queens.

=== Excavations ===
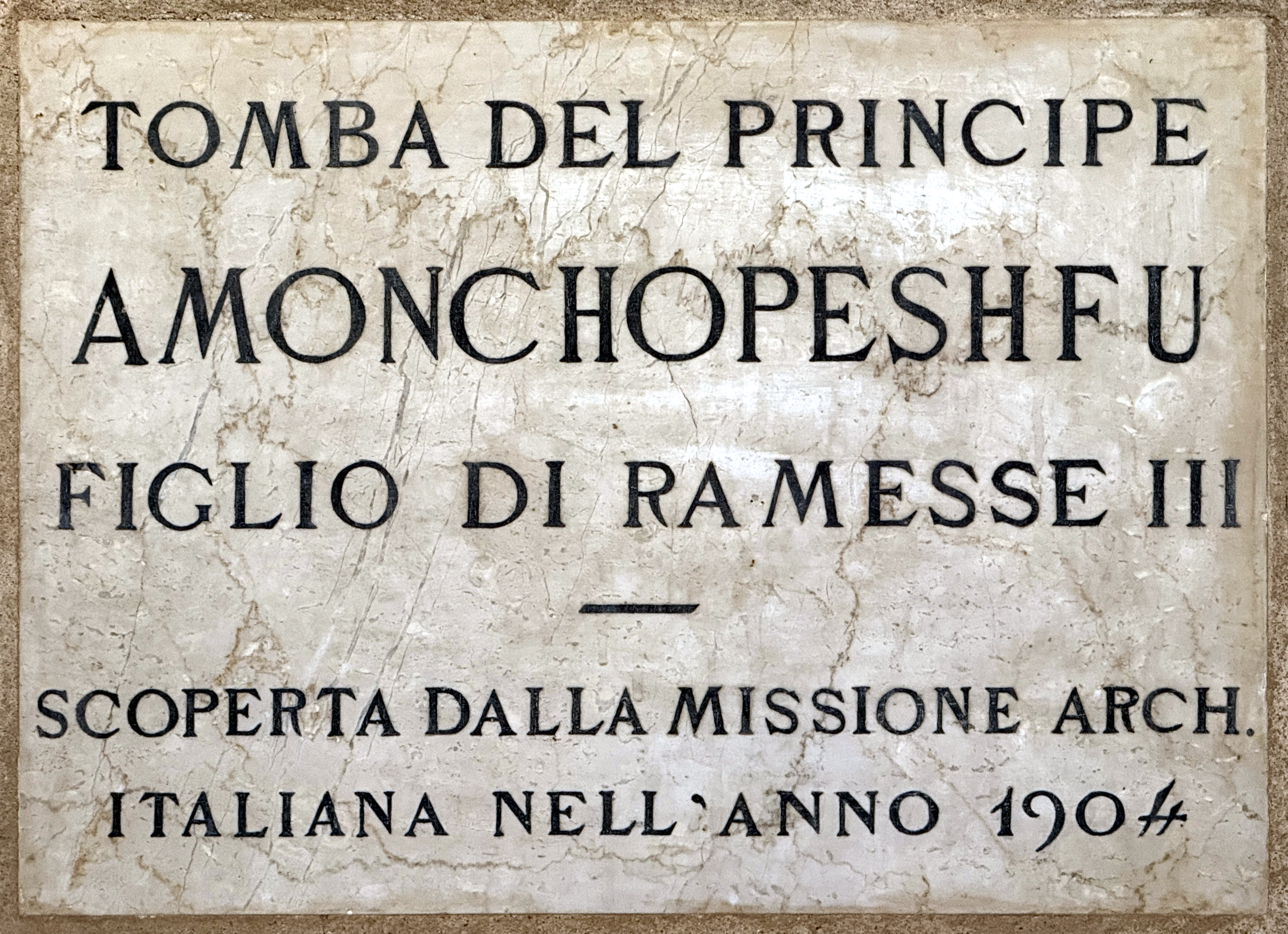
Marble plaque commemorating the discovery of the tomb of Amun-her-khepeshef; the inscription reads: "TOMBA DEL PRINCIPE / AMONCHOPESHFU / FIGLIO DI RAMESSE III / SCOPERTA DALLA MISSIONE ARCH. / ITALIANA NELL'ANNO 1904".

Ernesto Schiaparelli followed the trace of an ancient dam and in 1904 located the upper part of the tomb's entrance ramp. At the time of discovery, part of the plastered wall that originally closed the entrance was still in place. At the beginning of the excavation, the entrance was blocked by stones: one photograph in the series preserved at the Museo Egizio documents the removal of the fill in front of the entrance. The Italian Archaeological Mission built enclosure walls, a vault over the entrance and a heavy metal door. A photograph dated 1905-1914 documents the entrance to the tomb covered by a modern brick structure built by the Italian Archaeological Mission. The marble plaque placed by Schiaparelli along the route of the southwestern wadi commemorates the discovery of the tomb. In the excavation photographs of 1904, the prince's pink granite sarcophagus is documented in the burial chamber, while other images in the same series record the painted walls of the antechamber and burial chamber.

Schiaparelli excavations, 1904

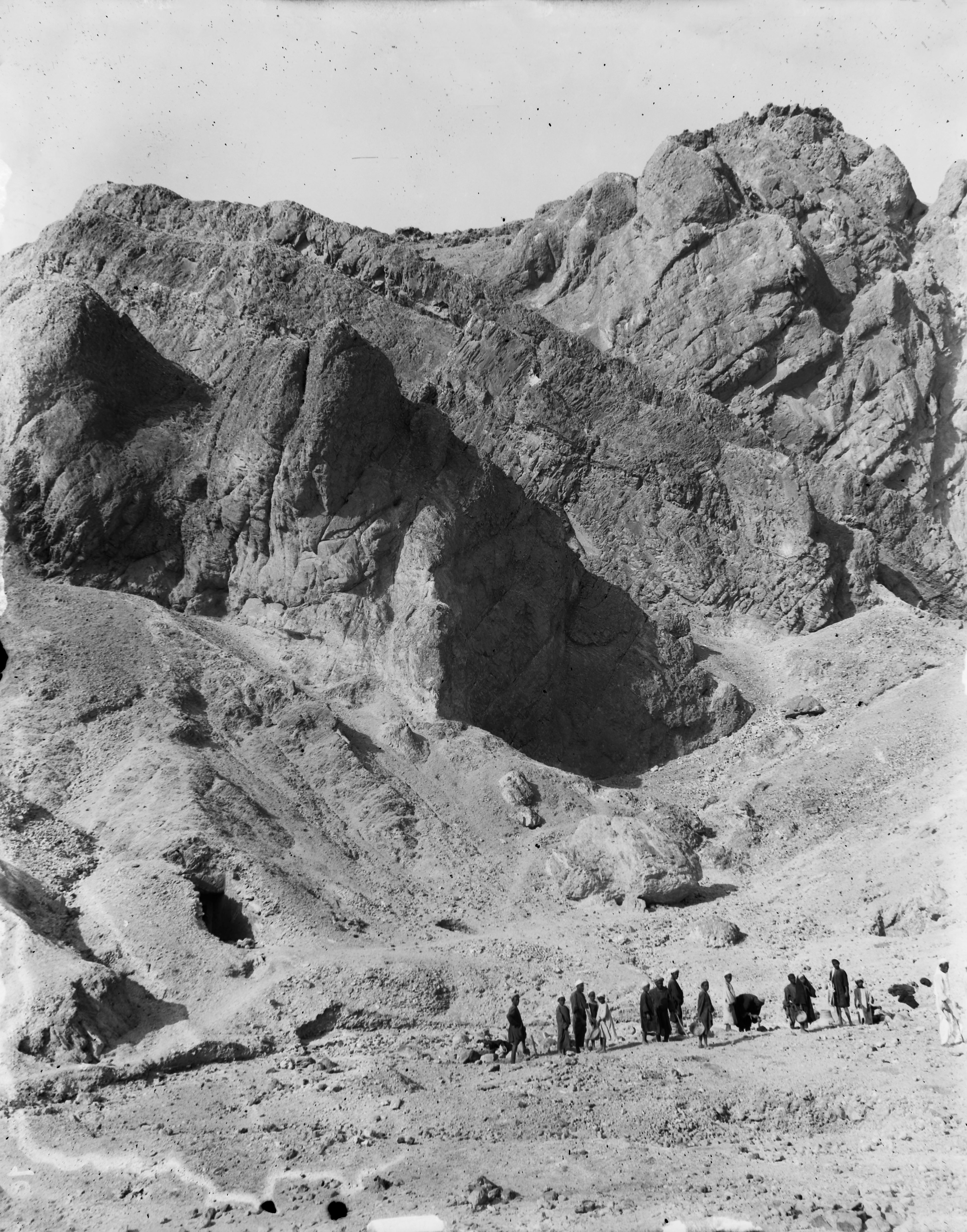
Excavation at the end of the Valley of the Queens, in front of the newly discovered QV55, before the construction of the modern brick covering.

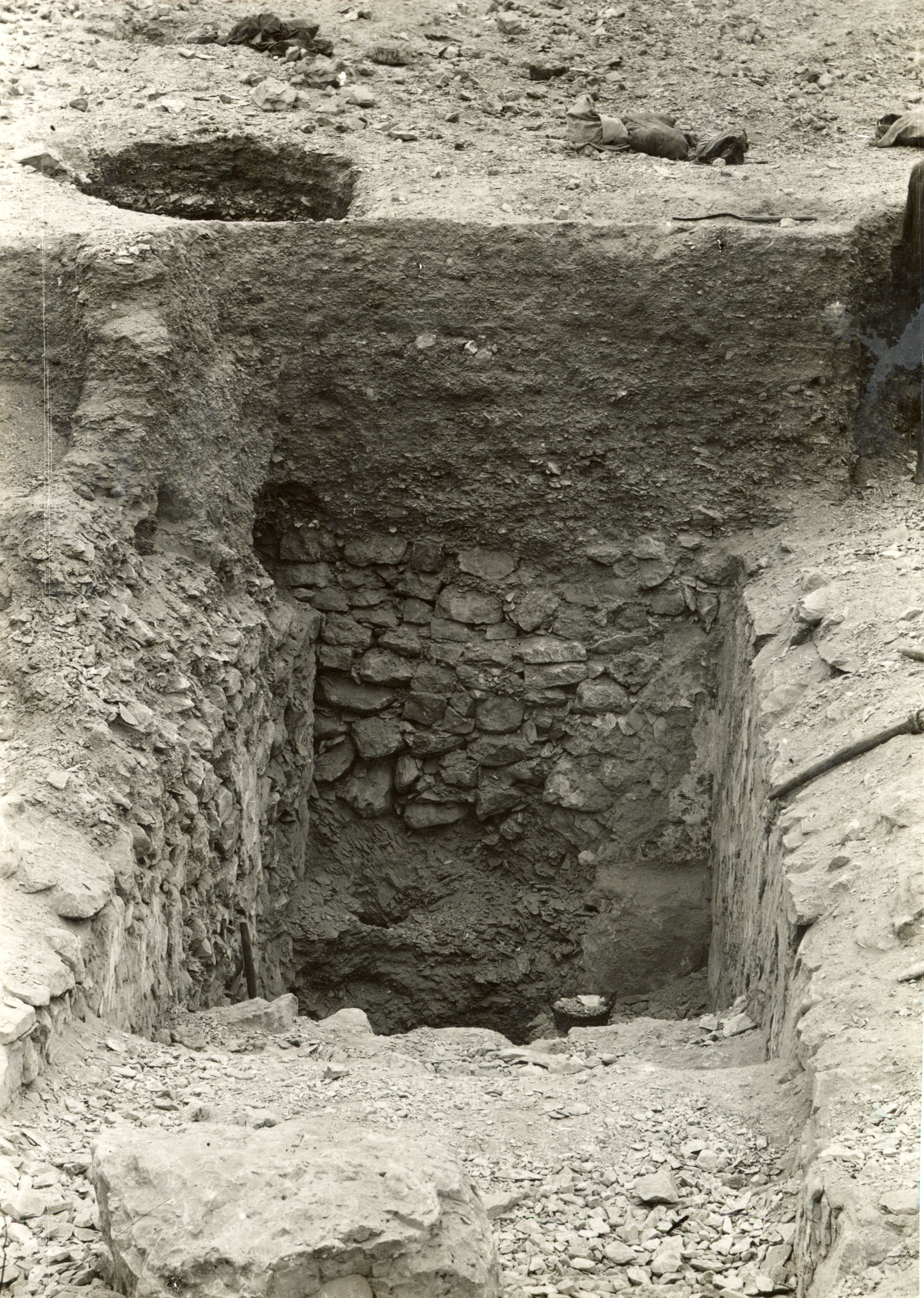
Beginning of the excavation of the entrance to QV55, which was then blocked by stones.

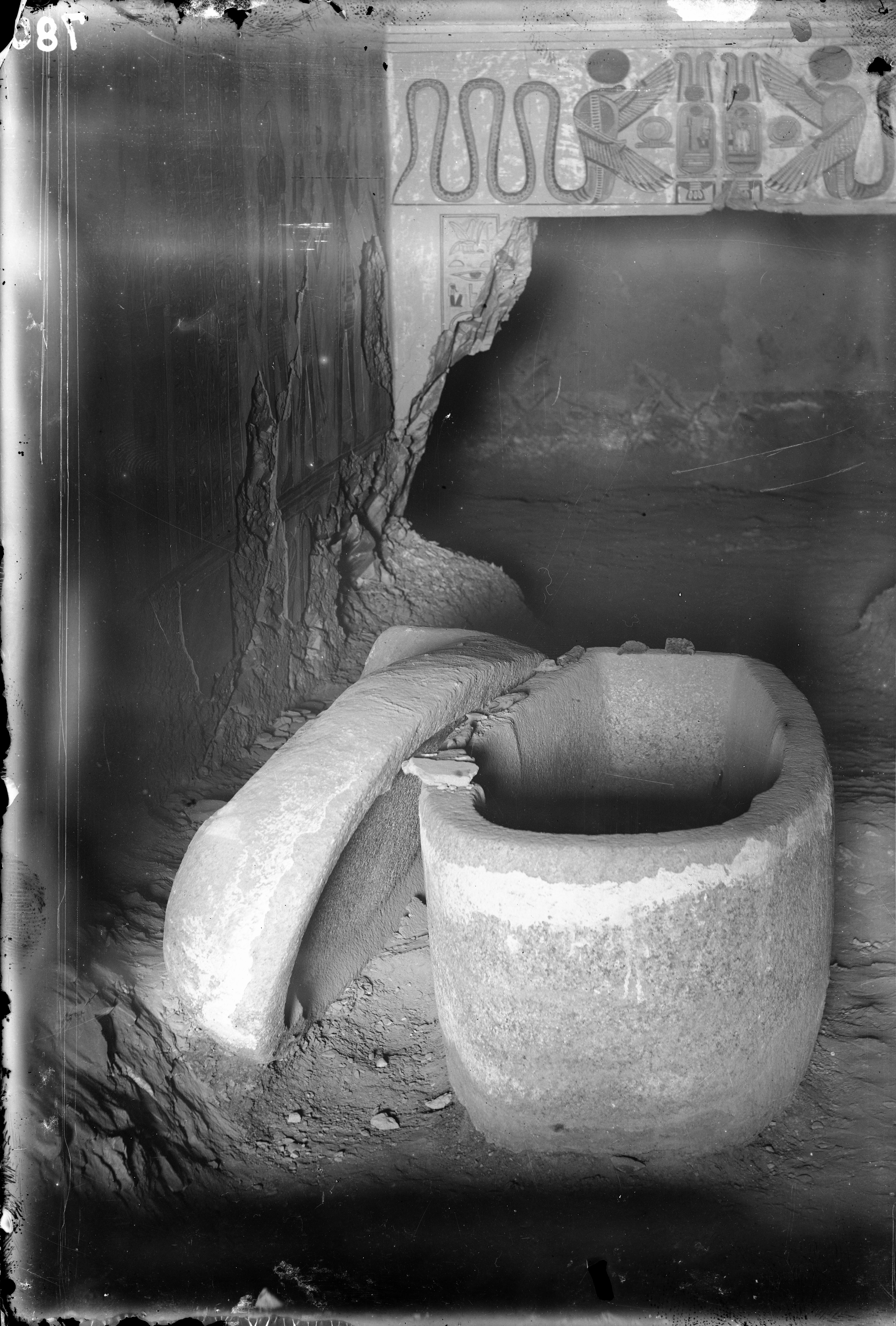
Interior of the tomb at the time of discovery; in the foreground is the prince's pink granite sarcophagus in the burial chamber.

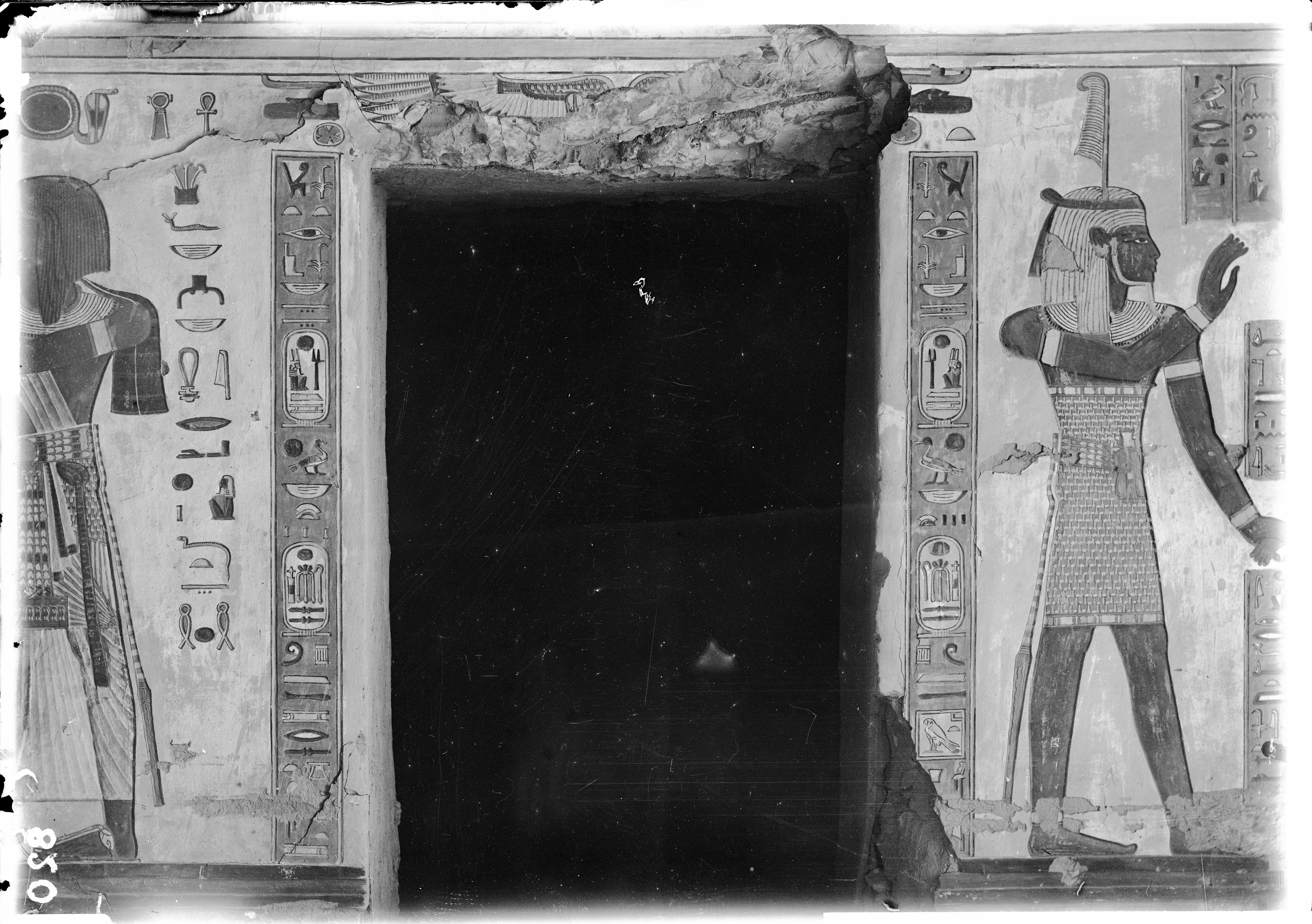
West wall of the antechamber, with the entrance to the side annex; Shu is visible on the right, while to the left of the entrance Ramesses III holds the hand of the funerary deity Qebehsenuef, who is not visible in the photograph.

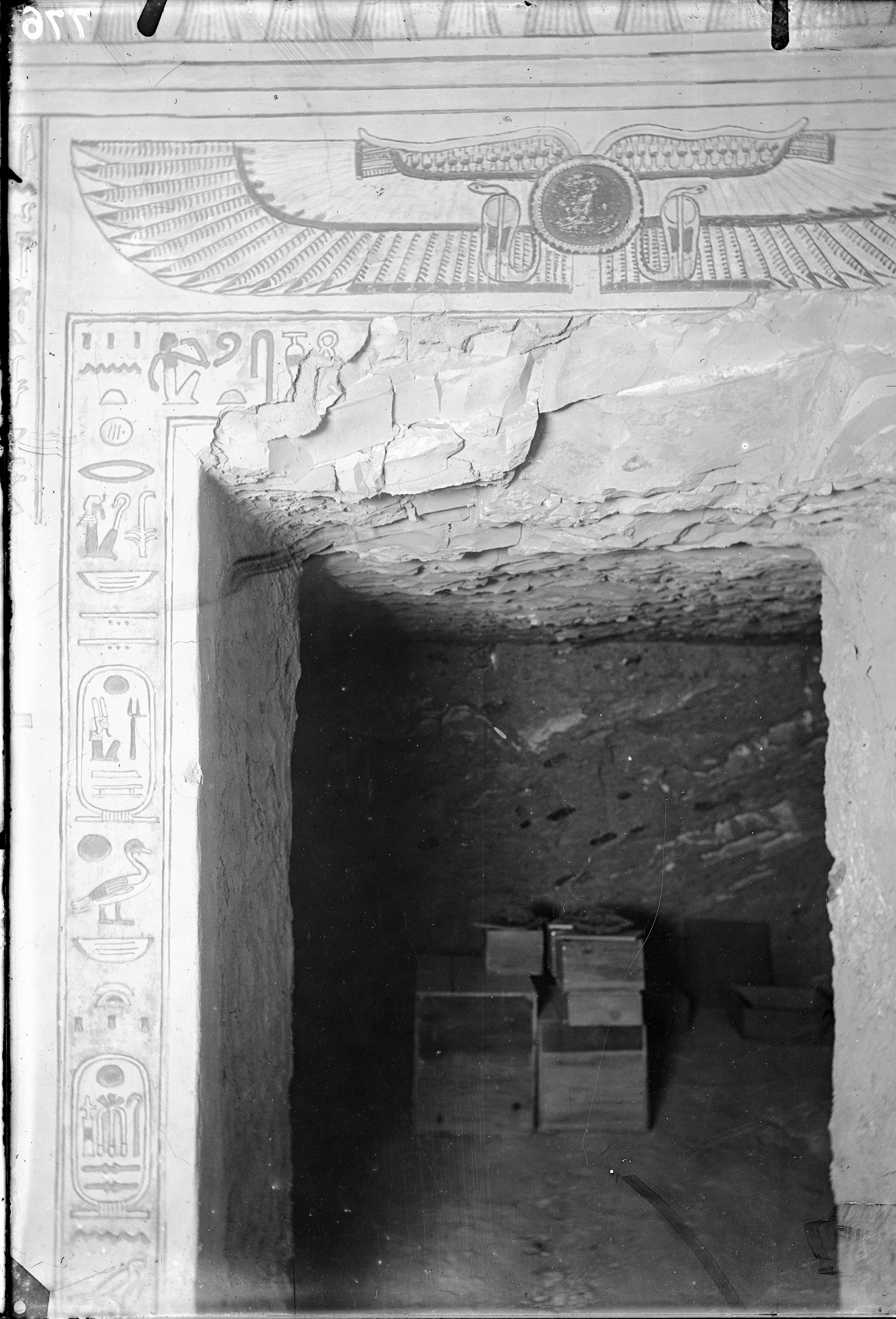
Access to the rear annex from the burial chamber; crates of the Italian Archaeological Mission are visible in the photograph.

== Description ==
=== Exterior ===
The tomb is located at the western end of the main wadi of the Valley of the Queens and is oriented along a northeast-southwest axis. The Theban Mapping Project plan gives the orientation of the main axis as 239° 27' 44". The tomb is cut into greyish marl rich in chert. The rock is described as generally of good quality, and for this reason it did not require extensive filling. The jambs of some doors are partly reconstructed in concrete.

=== Interior ===
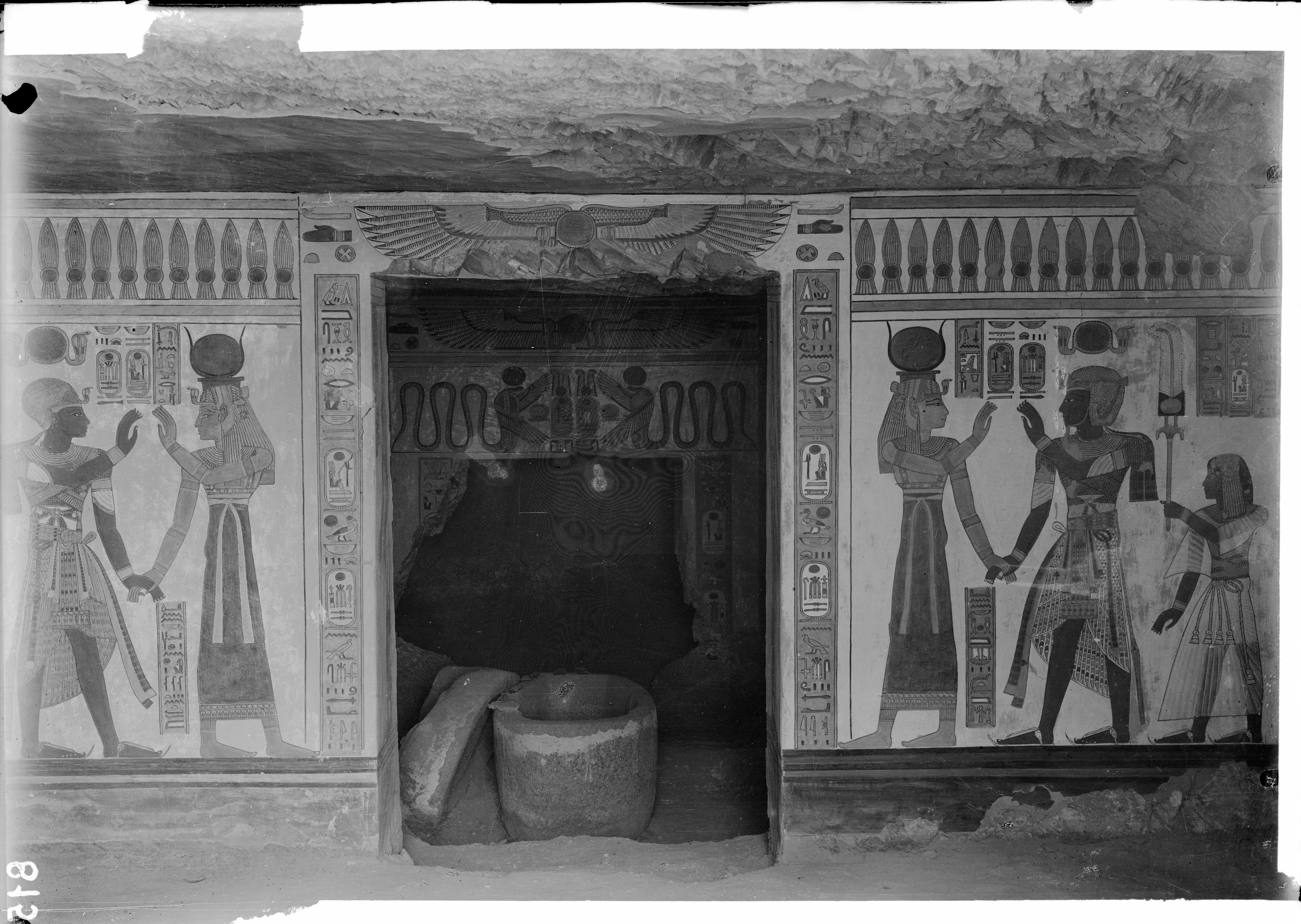
Interior of QV55 at the time of discovery, with the prince's granite sarcophagus in the foreground in the burial chamber; on either side are the scenes on the south wall of the antechamber, showing Ramesses III with Isis on the left and Hathor on the right, with Amun-her-khepeshef present in both scenes; the original archive caption identifies this as the wall of the first chamber opposite the entrance and the doorway of the sarcophagus chamber.

A long entrance ramp leads to chamber C, from which side chamber E opens to the north. Chamber C is followed by corridor G, with side chamber I to the north. The route ends in rear chamber K, which contains the granite sarcophagus. The position and dimensions of the sarcophagus are marked as approximate in the Theban Mapping Project plan.

=== Decoration ===
Many painted sunk-relief plasters survive in the tomb. Some parts of the decoration remained unfinished: side chamber E was plastered but not painted, while rear chamber K preserves only a base layer of plaster. The ceiling may also have been unfinished, since only a layer of black paint was applied to it. The south wall of the antechamber has two scenes with Ramesses III and the prince: on the left the king is with Isis, and on the right he is with Hathor. At the entrance to the burial chamber, Isis and Nephthys are represented with the water sign in their hands, welcoming the deceased into the underworld. Chamber G is decorated with four gate guardians, corresponding to gates 5-8 of chapter 145 of the Book of the Dead. Above the entrance to the rear chamber are a winged sun disk and two uraei around the cartouches of Ramesses III. Side chamber I and rear hall K are undecorated, while images of Isis and Nephthys are placed at the entrance to chamber K.

Interiors of the tomb in 2022

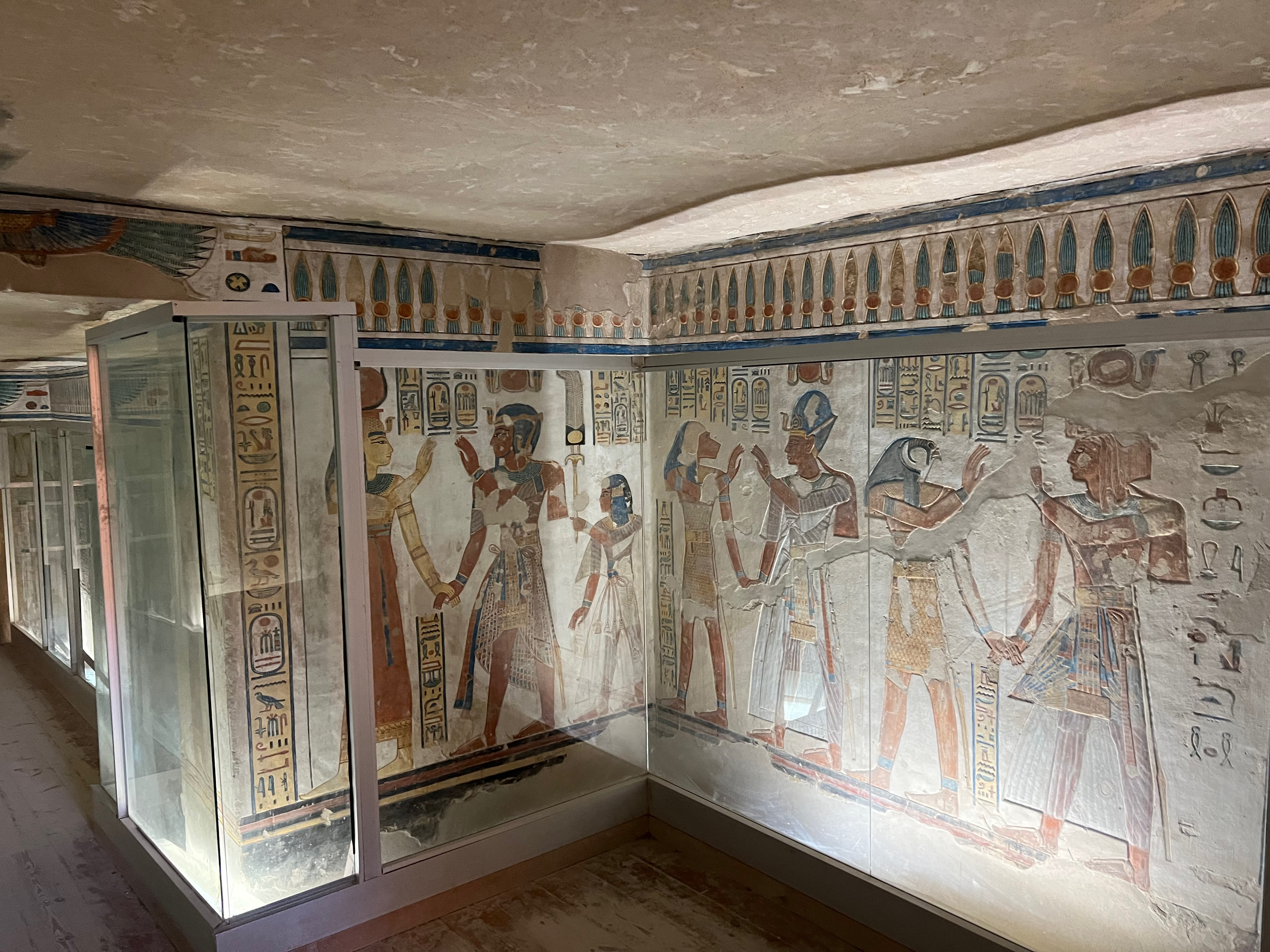
Decoration of chamber C, northwest corner; the opening on the left leads to corridor G.

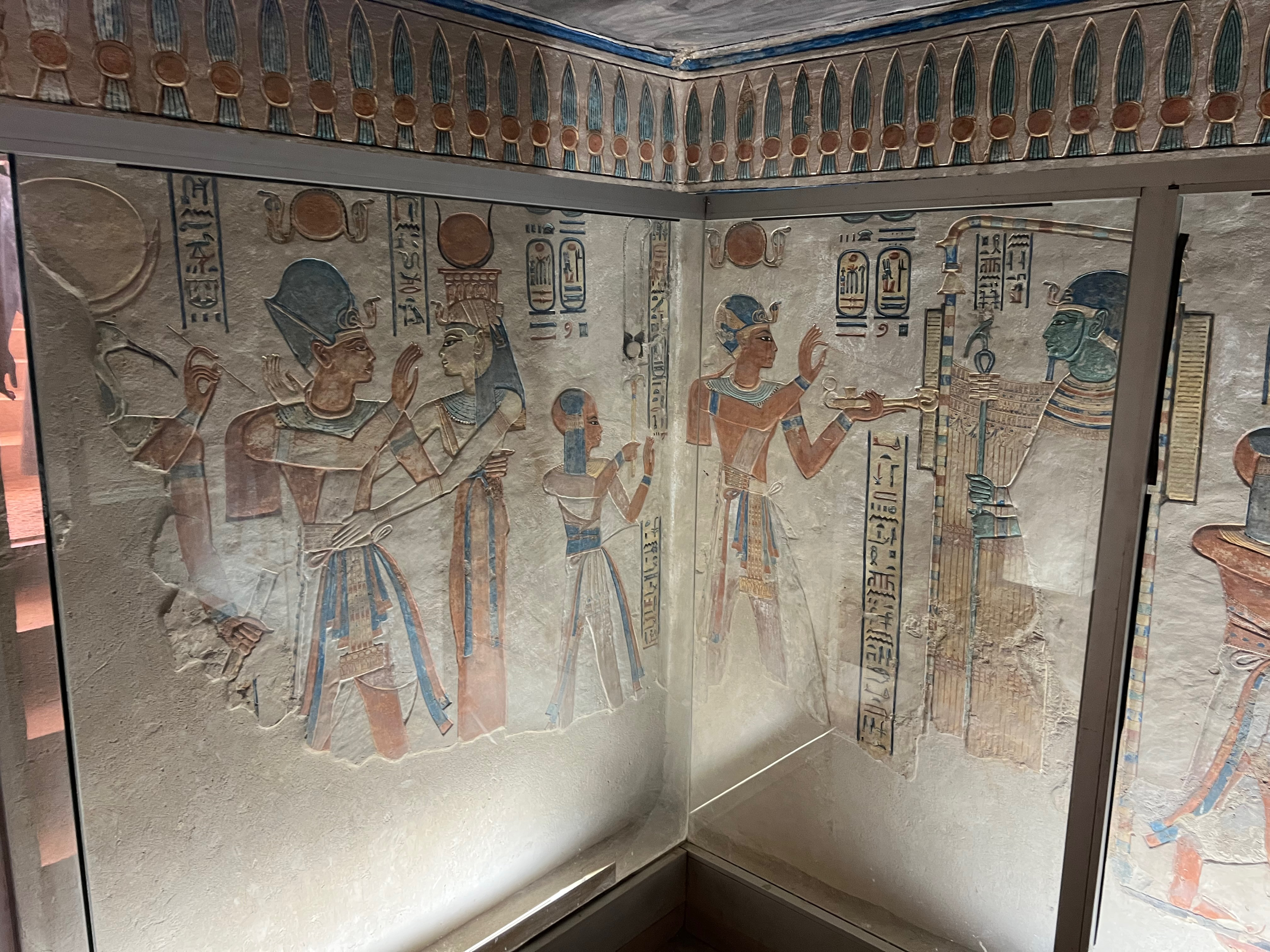
Decoration of chamber C, southeast corner; the opening on the left leads to entrance ramp A.

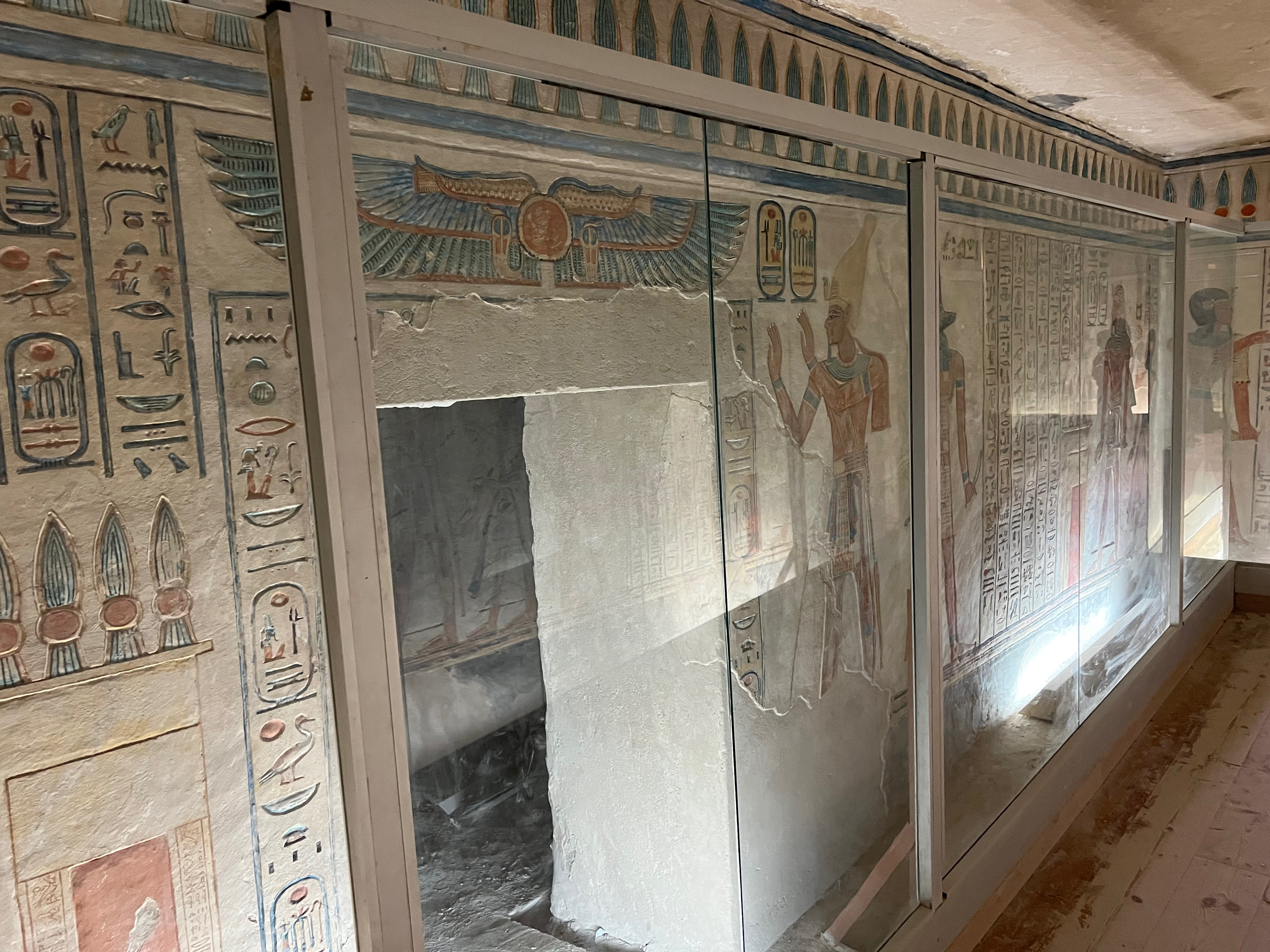
Decoration of corridor G, north wall; the opening leads to side chamber I.

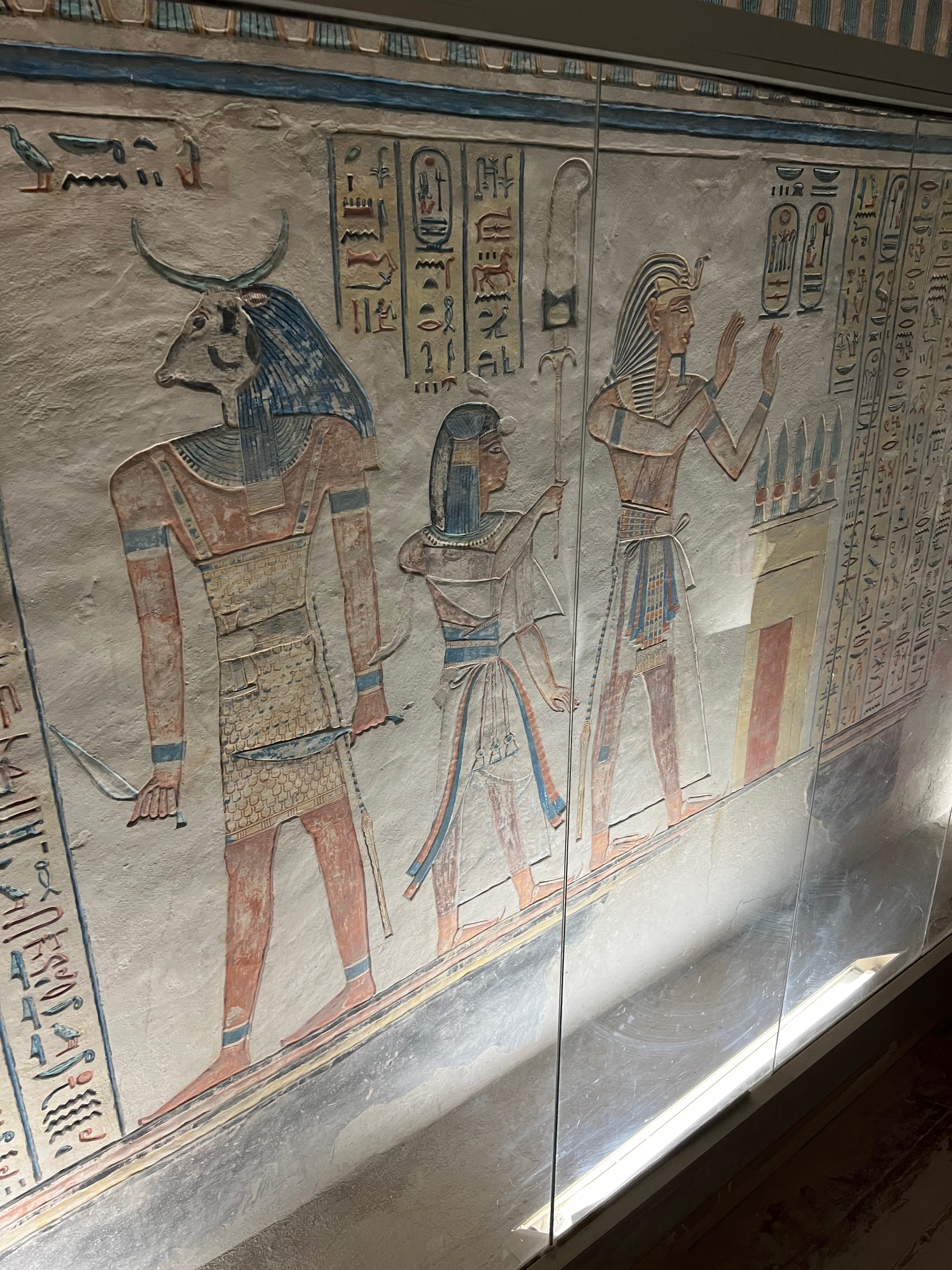
Decoration of corridor G, south wall.

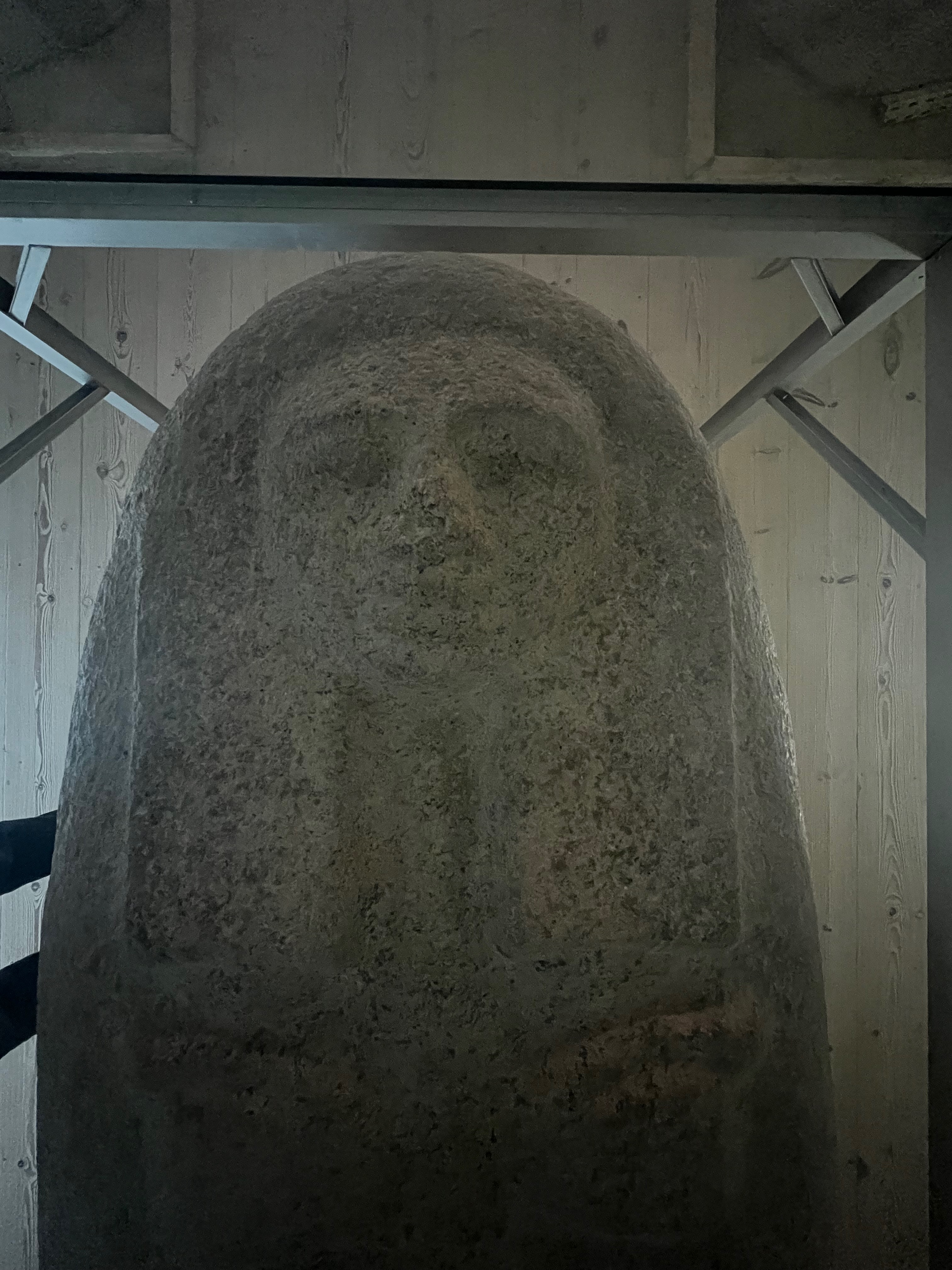
Granite sarcophagus in chamber K.

== Finds ==
At the time of discovery the tomb was empty, except for a few funerary objects and an unfinished sarcophagus. The sarcophagus was found in chamber G and was relocated to chamber K to allow passage through the narrow space. A mummified fetus, found in the Valley of Prince Ahmose (QV88), was placed in chamber K around 1974 and moved to chamber E in February 2010.

== See also ==
- Valley of the Queens
- Amun-her-khepeshef (20th dynasty)
- Ramesses III

== Bibliography ==
- Demas, Martha; Agnew, Neville, eds. (2012). Valley of the Queens Assessment Report: A Collaborative Project of the Getty Conservation Institute and the Supreme Council of Antiquities, Egypt. Vol. 1: Conservation and Management Planning. Los Angeles: Getty Conservation Institute. ISBN 9781937433406.
- Demas, Martha; Agnew, Neville, eds. (2016). Valley of the Queens Assessment Report: A Collaborative Project of the Getty Conservation Institute and the Supreme Council of Antiquities, Egypt. Vol. 2: Assessment of 18th, 19th, and 20th Dynasty Tombs. Los Angeles: Getty Conservation Institute. ISBN 9781937433369.
