= Amun-her-khepeshef (20th dynasty) =

Ancient Egyptian prince

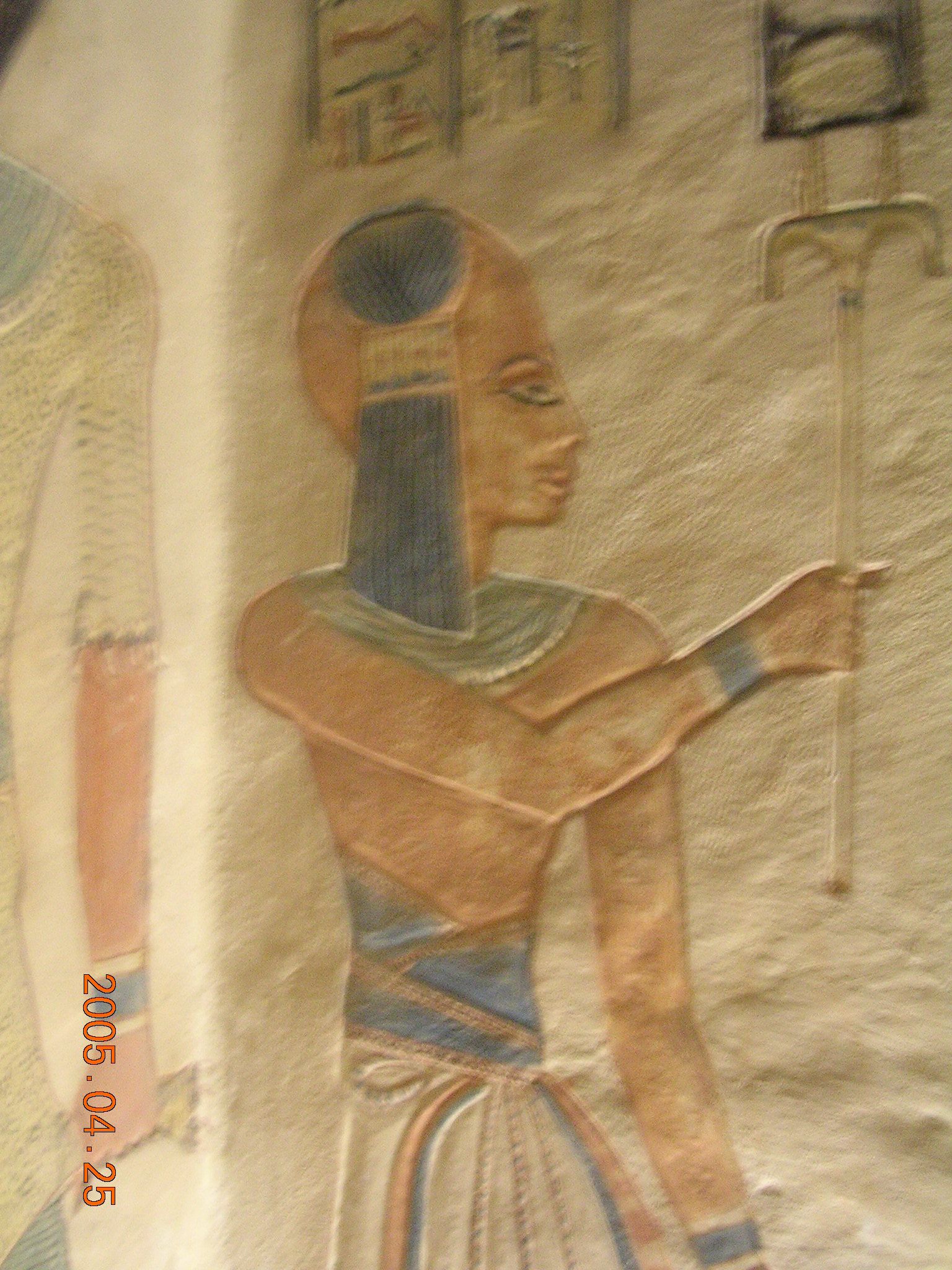
- Amunherkhepeshef from his tomb QV55
- Born: c. 12th century BC
- Burial: QV55, Valley of the Queens, Thebes
Egyptian name
i mn n F24 f
- Dynasty: 20th of Egypt
- Father: Pharaoh Ramesses III
- Religion: Ancient Egyptian religion

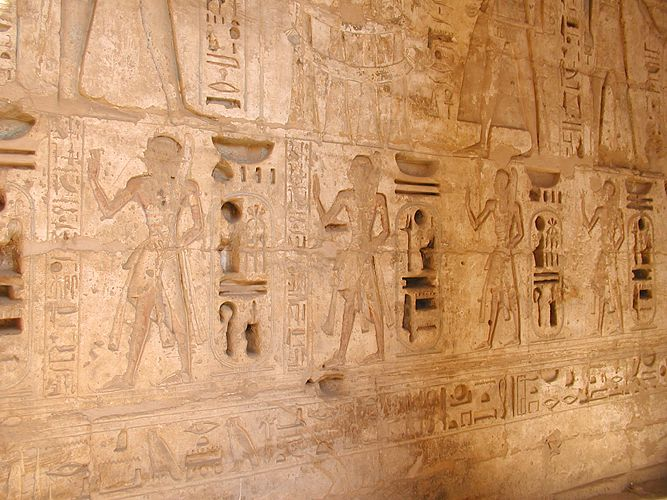
Amun-her-khepsef and other sons of Ramesses III

Amun-her-khepeshef (also Amun-her-khepeshef B (Note: The "B" in this name is not part of the original Egyptian name, rather it is a denomination added in modern Egyptology to distinguish him from other people of the same name: Amenherkhepshef A, a son of Ramesses II, Amenherkhepshef C, Ramesses VI, and Amenherkhepshef D, a son of Ramesses VI.)) was the eldest son and appointed heir of Pharaoh Ramesses III. Like at least another of his brothers, he was named after a son of Ramesses II, Amun-her-khepeshef. He died when he was about fifteen years old.

He is also mentioned as Ramesses Amun-her-khepeshef. He is not identical with his younger brother Ramesses VI, who was also called Amun-her-khepeshef before he became pharaoh.

He is depicted in his father's temple at Medinet Habu. His well preserved tomb, QV55 (in the Valley of the Queens) was excavated by Italian archaeologists in 1903–1904.
