= List of burials in the Valley of the Queens =

The following is a list of burials in the Valley of the Queens, in Thebes (modern Luxor, Egypt) and nearby associated areas.

== Map ==
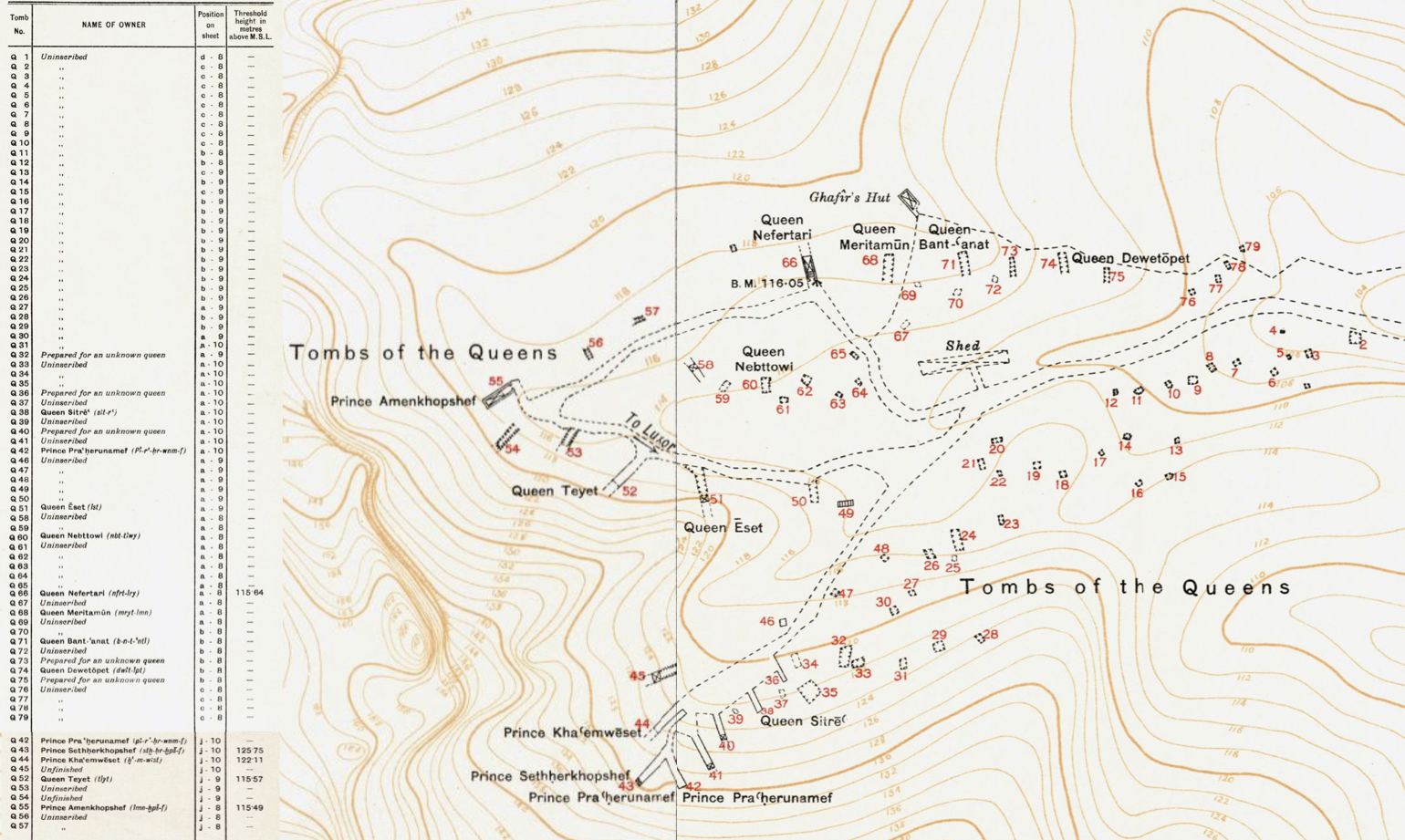

== Table legend ==
- Tomb is stable and open to visitors (Note: While the coloring is sourced by the Theban Mapping Project (via information usually provided in the "Conservation" section of each tomb profile), it is impossible to know when any given tomb will be open or closed to visitation.)
- Tomb is stable, but closed to visitors
- Tomb is unstable and/or unsafe and is closed to visitors
- Tomb location is not currently known

== Main valley ==
Number	Time Period	Discovered	Intended for	Position	Short summary
QV1	Byzantine	1959 (Note: Year of documentation)	Unknown	—N/a	QV1 was originally designated as a Pharaonic tomb, but has since been interpreted to be a Coptic hermit shelter.
QV2	18th Dynasty	1966	Anonymous	Unknown	Nothing remains of QV2 other than a shallow pit which was reburied in 2009 with debris.
QV3	18th Dynasty	1966	Anonymous	Unknown	QV3 is described as an undecorated shaft tomb which was last cleared from 1984 to 1985.
QV4	18th Dynasty	Unknown	Anonymous	Unknown	QV4 consists of a shaft entrance with two chambers that were reburied in 2010.
QV5	18th Dynasty	1960	Anonymous	Unknown	QV5 consists of a shallow pit leading to a single large chamber that is partly filled with debris.
QV6	18th Dynasty	1960	Anonymous	Unknown	QV6 is similar to QV5, a recent assessment has not been made as the tomb is largely filled with debris. It was recommended in 2008 that this tomb be reburied for visitor safety.
QV7	18th Dynasty	1960	Anonymous	Unknown	QV7 has 3 chambers, the excavation of chamber C was possibly started at a later stage. Flooding continues to be a serious threat to this particular site due to its vulnerable location.
QV8	18th Dynasty	1960	Hori	Prince	QV8 is attributed to Prince Hori, an unnamed King's daughter, and a person named Amenwesekhet. It was also reused in the Late Period (25th-26th Dynasties).
QV9	18th Dynasty	1960	Anonymous	Military (Note: This is a theory)	QV9 is an undecorated shaft tomb constructed during the reign of Thutmes I. This tomb may have been used by a member of the military as an arrow head and decorated leather fragment that may have been part of a quiver was found.
QV10	18th Dynasty	Unknown	Anonymous	Unknown	Finds in this tomb included a "mirror handle, part of a staff covered in pink leather, and glazed blue faience hair beads". It was also reused in the Third Intermediate and Roman Periods. Avian mummies placed in Roman period vases were also discovered in the tomb.
QV11	18th Dynasty	Unknown	Anonymous	Unknown	Artifacts recovered from this tomb indicate that it was reused "extensively" in the Third Intermediate, Late, and Roman Periods. These finds included Third Intermediate Period sarcophagi, and burial equipment attributed to a 25th Dynasty individual named Pariyah.
QV12	18th Dynasty	Unknown	Anonymous	Unknown	Artifacts recovered from this tomb indicate an original owner of an elevated rank. Finds include fragments of three arrows, a golden tip of a scepter, and Sarcophagus fragments inscribed with the name of Thutmes II. This tomb was also reused in the Third Intermediate and Roman Periods.
QV13	18th Dynasty	Unknown	Anonymous	Unknown	This tomb contained 18th Dynasty sarcophagus fragments, pottery, and glazed wig ornaments. it was also reused in the Third Intermediate and Roman Periods based on additional finds.
QV14	18th Dynasty	Unknown	Anonymous	Unknown	Not much is known about this tomb other than an 18th Dynasty age, it was possibly reused in the Third Intermediate and Roman Periods.
QV15	18th Dynasty	Unknown	Anonymous	Unknown	Not much is known about this tomb other than its age and connection to QV16 by a long passage.
QV16	18th Dynasty	Unknown	Anonymous	Unknown	Not much is known about this tomb other than its age and connection to QV15 by a long passage.
QV17	18th Dynasty	Unknown	Merytra I & Urmerutes	Princesses	This tomb has been ascribed to two 18th Dynasty princesses, Merytra (I) and Urmerutes based on artifacts that were found. One theory is that these could have been daughters of Amenhotep III. QV17 was also reused in the Late Period (25th-26th Dynasties).
QV18	18th Dynasty	Unknown	Anonymous	Unknown	This tomb may have been constructed during the reign of Amenhotep III, and reused during the Third Intermediate Period.
QV19	18th Dynasty	Unknown	Anonymous	Unknown	QV19 has a single shaft leading to a large chamber which is dated to the 18th Dynasty.
QV20	18th Dynasty	Unknown	Anonymous	Unknown	This has been described as the "largest" 18th Dynasty shaft tomb, with a probable royal association.
QV21	18th Dynasty	Unknown	Anonymous	Unknown	Recovered artifacts indicate that this tomb was reused during the Third Intermediate, Roman, and Coptic periods
QV22	18th Dynasty	Unknown	Anonymous	Unknown	Recovered artifacts are similar to QV21, but just date to the Third Intermediate period.
QV23	18th Dynasty	Unknown	Anonymous	Unknown	This tomb was reused during the Third Intermediate period.
QV24	20th Dynasty	Unknown	Unfinished	—N/a	It's believed by TMP that the location of QV25 was forgotten about until workers constructing QV24 ran into it.
QV25	18th Dynasty	Unknown	Anonymous	Unknown	Not much is known about this tomb other than its 18th Dynasty age.
QV26	18th Dynasty	Unknown	Anonymous	Unknown	Not much is known about this tomb other than its 18th Dynasty age.
QV27	18th Dynasty	Unknown	Anonymous	Unknown	This 18th Dynasty tomb collapsed in antiquity and has been described as "unstable".
QV28	This tomb could not be located by the most recent study, and may lie under a guard house on the premises.				
QV29	18th Dynasty	Unknown	Anonymous	Unknown	This 18th Dynasty tomb partly collapsed in antiquity and has been noted to be in "poor condition".
QV30	18th Dynasty	Antiquity	Nebiri	Head of the Stables	Reign of Tuthmosis III
QV31	19th Dynasty	c.1828	Anonymous	Queen	Time of Seti I
QV32	18th Dynasty	c.1854	Anonymous	Unknown	Not much is known about this tomb other than its 18th Dynasty age.
QV33	19th Dynasty	c.1828	Tanedjemet	Princess-Queen	Time of Seti I
QV34	19th Dynasty	1926	Anonymous	Princess-Queen	Time of Seti I
QV35	18th Dynasty	c.1985	Anonymous	Unknown	QV35 is a completed shaft with no chambers.
QV36	19th Dynasty	1905	Anonymous	Princess-Queen	Time of Seti I
QV37	18th Dynasty	1903	Anonymous	Unknown	Not much is known about this tomb other than its 18th Dynasty age.
QV38	19th Dynasty	c.1828	Sitre	Queen	Wife of Ramesses I
QV39	18th Dynasty	Unknown	Anonymous	Unknown	QV39 could have been intended for Prince Wadimose or another royal of the 18th Dynasty, whose tutor was Imhotep.
QV40	19th Dynasty	c.1826	Anonymous	Princess-Queen	Time of Seti I
QV41	20th Dynasty	c.1826	Anonymous	Unknown	This unfinished tomb may have been for a son of Rameses III, it was reused in later periods.
QV42	20th Dynasty	c.1826	Pareherwenemef	Prince	Son of Ramesses III, Possibly also occupied by Minefer, wife of Rameses III
QV43	20th Dynasty	1903	Seth-her-khopsef	Prince	This 18th Dynasty tomb was intended for a son of Ramesses III, who later became Ramesses VIII. It has been periodically opened to visitation, most recently in 2012.
QV44	20th Dynasty	1903	Khaemwaset	Prince	Son of Ramesses III, Buried in reign of Rameses IV
QV45	20th Dynasty	c.1896	Unused	Unknown	Unfinished tomb; construction was likely abandoned due to collapses in ceiling structure
QV46	18th Dynasty	1905	Imhotep	Vizier	Vizier under Thutmose I
QV47	17th Dynasty	1905	Ahmose	Princess	This tomb was for the daughter of Seqenenre Tao and Sitdjehuti. While stable, "loose and falling surface rock" makes the tomb dangerous.
QV48	18th Dynasty	Unknown	Anonymous	Unknown	Not much is known about this tomb other than its 18th Dynasty age, and unstable domed ceiling.
QV49	19th Dynasty	c.1828	Unfinished	—N/a	QV49 was abandoned after the entryway was cut.
QV50	20th Dynasty	Unknown	Unfinished	—N/a	QV 50 was possibly abandoned after an unintentional connection was made with QV 49.
QV51	20th Dynasty	c.1826	Iset Ta-Hemdjert	Queen	Wife of Ramesses III, mother of Ramesses VI
QV52	20th Dynasty	c.1816	Tyti	Princess-Queen	Wife of Ramesses III, daughter of Setnakhte
QV53	20th Dynasty	c.1826	Ramesses Meryamen	Prince	Son of Ramesses III
QV54	20th Dynasty	c.1826	Unfinished	—N/a	This unfinished tomb is now used by site personnel to rest and store items.
QV55	20th Dynasty	1904	Amun-her-khepeshef	Prince	Son of Ramesses III
QV56	19th Dynasty	c.1854	Unfinished	—N/a	Unstable rock may have halted the construction of this single chambered tomb.
QV57	19th Dynasty	c.1854	Unfinished	—N/a	Unstable rock may have halted the construction of this single chambered tomb.
QV58	19th Dynasty	c.1826	Anonymous	Queen	Time of Ramesses II
QV59	18th Dynasty	Unknown	Anonymous	Unknown	Not much is known about this tomb other than its 18th Dynasty age.
QV60	19th Dynasty	c.1826	Nebettawy	Princess-Queen	This tomb was for a daughter-wife of Ramesses II, the structural stability of the tomb is now seriously compromised by the loss of interior walls.
QV61	18th Dynasty	Unknown	Anonymous	Unknown	This tomb contained the remains of an unknown individual along with some pottery.
QV62	18th Dynasty	Unknown	Anonymous	Unknown	Not much is known about this tomb other than its 18th Dynasty age.
QV63	18th Dynasty	Unknown	Anonymous	Unknown	Not much is known about this tomb other than its 18th Dynasty age.
QV64	18th Dynasty	Unknown	Anonymous	Unknown	Not much is known about this tomb other than its 18th Dynasty age.
QV65	18th Dynasty	c.1828	Anonymous	Unknown	This 18th Dynasty tomb was reused in the Roman period.
QV66	19th Dynasty	1904	Nefertari	Queen	Wife of Ramesses II
QV67	18th Dynasty	Unknown	Anonymous	Unknown	Not much is known about this tomb other than its 18th Dynasty age.
QV68	19th Dynasty	c.1826	Meritamun	Princess-Queen	Daughter-wife of Ramesses II
QV69	18th Dynasty	Unknown	Anonymous	Unknown	QV69 is now used as a "magazine for archaeological study materials cleared from other tombs in the QV".
QV70	18th Dynasty	Unknown	Nehesy	Unknown	
QV71	19th Dynasty	c.1826	Bintanath	Princess-Queen	Daughter-wife of Ramesses II
QV72	18th Dynasty	c.1845	Neferhat & Baki	Princess & Prince	
QV73	19th Dynasty	c.1826	Henuttawy	Princess-Queen	This tomb was for a daughter-wife of Ramesses II. It now has numerous faults and structural concerns related to open joints, and bedding plane tilting.
QV74	20th Dynasty	c.1826	Duatentopet (Note: Also known as "Tentopet")	Queen	Wife of Ramesses IV. Usurped from an unused tomb of a 19th Dynasty Princess.
QV75	19th Dynasty	c.1826	Henutmire	Princess-Queen	Daughter-wife of Ramesses II (or possibly a sister)
QV76	18th Dynasty	Unknown	Merytre	Princess	
QV77	18th Dynasty	Unknown	Anonymous	Unknown	This 18th Dynasty tomb was reused during later periods.
QV78	18th Dynasty	1844	Anonymous	Unknown	This 18th Dynasty tomb was reused during the Roman period for group burials.
QV79	18th Dynasty	Unknown	Anonymous	Unknown	This 18th Dynasty tomb was reused during later periods.
QV80	19th Dynasty	c.1826	Tuya	Queen	Wife of Seti I and mother of Ramesses II.
QV81	18th Dynasty	Unknown	Heka(...)	Unknown	Name only partially preserved
QV82	18th Dynasty	Unknown	Minemhat & Amenhotep	Princes	
QV83	18th Dynasty	Unknown	Anonymous	Unknown	It's unclear if this 18th Dynasty tomb was ever completed.
QV84	20th Dynasty	Unknown	Unfinished	—N/a	Unfinished tomb from the 20th Dynasty due to poor rock quality.
QV85	20th Dynasty	Unknown	Unfinished	—N/a	Unfinished tomb from the 20th Dynasty due to poor rock quality.
QV86	20th Dynasty	Unknown	Unfinished	—N/a	Unfinished tomb from the 20th Dynasty due to poor rock quality.
QV87	18th Dynasty	1905	Anonymous	Unknown	This 18th Dynasty tomb contained pottery, it's now described by TMP as "structurally compromised with severely fractured and friable rock".
QV88	18th Dynasty	1903	Ahmose	Prince	Son of Nebesu and Ian. The mummy was that of a fetus.
QV94	18th Dynasty	Unknown	Anonymous	Unknown	QV94 contained a "substantial" amount of pottery dating to the reign of Amenhotep III, along with the bones of several children. Of issue is the shaft entrance which now shows evidence of erosion which created a "wide, unstable and potentially dangerous opening".
QV95	20th Dynasty	1906	Anonymous	Unknown	This 20th Dynasty tomb was never finished, it later served as a Coptic monastery.
QV96	18th Dynasty	Unknown	Anonymous	Unknown	Artifacts from this 18th Dynasty tomb include a partial wooden scepter, Faiencepanels from furniture, and funerary offerings.
QV98	18th Dynasty	1903	Anonymous	Unknown	Not much is known about this tomb other than its 18th Dynasty age.
QVU1	18th Dynasty	2006	Anonymous	Unknown	This unknown tomb ("U") is not on any extant map and requires confirmation.
QVU2	18th Dynasty	2006	Anonymous	Unknown	This unknown tomb ("U") is not on any extant map and requires confirmation.

== Three Pits and Rope ==
The following tombs are located in the Valley of the Three Pits, and the Valley of the Rope. Both of these valleys lie north of the main valley, and are associated with the Valley of the Queens. QV92, 93, and 97 are located in the latter of these two, while the former contains the rest. Tombs QVA to QVL in particular belonged to elite officials and members of the royal court during the reign of Thutmose III. These lettered tombs have since become inaccessible due to instability concerns as noted during a survey and documentation study conducted by the Getty Conservation Institute (GCI) and the Supreme Council of Antiquities (SCA) between 2006 and 2008.

Number	Time Period	Discovered	Intended for	Position	Short summary
QV89	18th Dynasty	Antiquity	Anonymous	Unknown	This 18th Dynasty tomb was already opened when discovered. It may have contained artifacts dating stylistically to the 25th or 26th Dynasty.
QV90	18th Dynasty	1895	Anonymous	Unknown	This 18th Dynasty tomb may have contained artifacts dating stylistically to the 25th or 26th Dynasty.
QV91	18th Dynasty	1895	Anonymous	Unknown	This 18th Dynasty tomb may have contained artifacts dating stylistically to the 25th or 26th Dynasty.
QV92	18th Dynasty	1905	Anonymous	Unknown	QV92 is an 18th Dynasty single-chamber shaft tomb.
QV93	18th Dynasty	1905	Anonymous	Unknown	Not much is known about this 18th Dynasty tomb.
QV97	18th Dynasty	1903	Anonymous	Unknown	QV97 is described as "unstable", and has never been fully excavated.
QVA	18th Dynasty	Antiquity	Minmes	Official	This tomb belonged to an 18th Dynasty official named Minmes, who held the title of "cup-bearer" for Thutmose III.
QVB	18th Dynasty	Antiquity	Anonymous	Official	Several artifacts were found in QVB including seal impressions, and a "fragmentary jar filled with linens" used during the mummification of the owner.
QVC	18th Dynasty	Antiquity	Anonymous	Official	Constructed under the reign of Thutmose III for an unnamed official.
QVD	18th Dynasty	Antiquity	Anonymous	Official	Several artifacts were found in QVD including braided hair extensions prepared with beeswax. Coffin fragments suggest that the tomb was reused.
QVE	18th Dynasty	Antiquity	Anonymous	Official	Several artifacts were found in QVE, including nasal obturators, utilitarian amphorae, vases, and pottery dating to the reign of Thutmose III.
QVF	18th Dynasty	Antiquity	Anonymous	Official	Several artifacts were found in QVF including various types of beads, the handle of a miniature lotiform fan, and pieces of a blue glass paste bracelet.
QVG	18th Dynasty	Antiquity	Kari	Official	This tomb belonged to an 18th Dynasty official named Kari, who was an official under Thutmose III.
QVH	18th Dynasty	Antiquity	Anonymous	Official	QVH contained two amphorae dating to the Third Intermediate Period, suggesting that this 18th Dynasty tomb was reused.
QVI	18th Dynasty	Antiquity	Anonymous	Official	QVI contained an amphora dating to the Third Intermediate Period, suggesting that this 18th Dynasty tomb was reused.
QVJ	18th Dynasty	Antiquity	Anonymous	Official	Several artifacts were found in QVJ including fragments of a vase of foreign origin, fragments of alabaster vessels, and several fragmentary clay balls with blue and black glazed frit. The Theban Mapping Project notes that the latter find is related to a rite called "Hitting the ball".
QVK	18th Dynasty	Antiquity	Anonymous	Official	Several artifacts were found in QVK including fragments of a wooden sarcophagus, leather sandals, uninscribed canopic fragments, and fragments of jewelry.
QVL	18th Dynasty	Antiquity	Anonymous	Official	Several artifacts were found in QVL including fragments of a wooden sarcophagus, leather sandals, uninscribed canopic fragments, and fragments of jewelry. The exact location of this tomb has since been lost as the entrance was naturally reburied.

== Western Wadis ==
The following 18th Dynasty tombs are located in the Western Wadis, which is associated with the "Valley of the Queens". As the name implies, the "Western Wadis" are located west of the valleys of the Three Pits/Rope, and northwest of the main valley.

Number	Discovered	Intended for	Position	Short summary
WB-1	1917	Multi-burials	Multiple	First described by Howard Carter, this 18th Dynasty tomb consists of six shafts with multiple owners. Notable original owners include; Princess Tiaa (reburied), Prince Menkheperre, and Nebetnehat. The tomb is now closed to the public due to its remote "dangerous" point of entry.
Wadi 1-b	1917	Anonymous	Unknown	Wadi 1-b was first noted by Howard Carter during his survey of the Western Wadis in 1916–1917. It was later mapped and researched by Elizabeth Thomas in 1959–1960. During her visit, Thomas saw fragments of "blue painted ware (pottery) typical of the reigns of Amenhotep III to Akhenaten" scattered around the shaft. The additional discovery of Coptic ware in the tomb came as no surprise due to previously discovered Coptic dwelling remains in the area.
Wadi A-1	1916	Hatshepsut	Queen	This hidden cliff tomb located 70 metres (230 ft) above the valley floor was originally for Queen Hatshepsut before she ascended to the throne. The tomb's intended owner was identified when Howard Carter examined a large quartzite sarcophagus (now in the Egyptian Museum) in the tomb sometime in 1916. Hatshepsut never used this tomb, and was later interred in KV20 (King's Valley). The tomb is now closed to the public due to its remote "dangerous" point of entry.
Wadi A-2	Antiquity	Anonymous	Queen	Wadi A-2 is another "well hidden" cliff tomb located 70 metres (230 ft) above the valley floor. It was plundered in antiquity and was rediscovered by locals from the West Bank, who "subsequently" mentioned its location to Howard Carter (1916–1917). Émile Baraize excavated the tomb in 1921 and found a bit of gold leaf, the neck and stopper of a pottery jug, and fragments of a cosmetic jar's alabaster lid. These finds as well as a close proximity to Hatshepsut's tomb suggest that A-2 most likely belonged to an 18th Dynasty queen. The tomb is now closed to the public due to its remote "dangerous" point of entry.
Wadi A-3	1960	Anonymous	Unknown	This tomb has been dated to the 18th Dynasty due to its close proximity to Hatshepsut's cliff tomb (Wadi A-1). Wadi A-3 was not noted by Carter, and was later documented by Elizabeth Thomas by 1960. It's not certain whether the tomb was abandoned or whether the lower chamber is blocked by very hard debris. This open tomb is in danger of being reburied by debris falling from the cliff above and/or by flooding.
Wadi A-4	1916	Anonymous	Unknown	Wadi A-4 dates to the 18th Dynasty for the same given reason as A-3. Howard Carter first noted this tomb (1916–1917) who stated that it was probably "open since early times". This now remains debated as the tomb has never been fully excavated to see if it was unfinished or emptied at a later date. Wadi A-4 is also in danger of being reburied by debris falling from the cliff above and/or by flooding.
Wadi A-5	Antiquity	Anonymous	Unknown	Wadi A-5 dates to the 18th Dynasty for the same given reason as A-3. Howard Carter first noted this tomb (1916–1917) and speculated that it had been open since the Coptic period as he found pottery fragments that date to that time. The tomb's location was lost afterwards until 2021, when it was rediscovered, mapped, and cleared. It remains unknown if this tomb was unfinished or emptied at a later date.
Wadi C-1	Antiquity	Neferure?	Princess	This cliff tomb is located 70 metres (230 ft) above the valley floor and was plundered in antiquity. The interior is described as "plastered but not decorated", and may have belonged to a princess. Howard Carter suggested Princess Neferure based on an "account of a graffito of a Cartouche" he had found. The tomb is now closed to the public due to its remote "dangerous" point of entry.
Wadi C-2	Antiquity	Anonymous	Unknown	Wadi C-2 was first noted by Howard Carter (1916–1917), who saw it was "open and had been plundered". The only feature of this tomb is a deep shaft that widens at the bottom. Every attempt to explore the bottom of the shaft has been unsuccessful due to the amount of debris that has accumulated inside.
Wadi C-3	Antiquity	Anonymous	Unknown	Wadi C-3 is exactly the same as C2 except for being "shallow" and "open" as opposed to "deep" and filled with debris. It was also plundered in antiquity as noted by Howard Carter.
Wadi C-4	2022	Thutmose II	King (Pharaoh)	Unnoticed until 2022, the tomb was likened by excavators to KV5 due to the extent of flood debris in the tomb. The tomb bears hallmarks of a king's burial, including blue-painted ceiling with yellow stars, the remains of an Amduat depicted on the walls and inscribed vessels bearing the king's name and Hatshesput's name as his great wife. In 2025, the Ministry of Tourism and Antiquities announced the tomb to be that of Thutmose II.
Wadi D-1	1916	Menhet, Menwi, & Merti	Concubines	Wadi D-1 is another "well hidden" cliff tomb located 10 metres (33 ft) above the valley floor. The tomb belonged to three foreign wives of Thutmes III whose names are Menhet, Menwi, and Merti. After their burial the tomb lay undisturbed until August 1916, when it was discovered by locals from the West Bank and robbed. Howard Carter was able to recover most of the loot which helped identify their original owners. This tomb is now closed to the public due to its remote "dangerous" point of entry.
Wadi D-2	Antiquity	Anonymous	Unknown	Howard Carter noted (c.1916-1917) that this tomb contained the graves of baboons and had already been plundered. The meaning or reason behind the baboon burials is unknown. One theory is that they may be associated with a private tomb. Wadi D-2 is now "mostly blocked and badly eroded", leaving its visitation status in question.
Wadi D-3	Antiquity	Anonymous	Unknown	Howard Carter noted (c.1916-1917) that this tomb contained the graves of baboons and had already been plundered. The meaning or reason behind the baboon burials is unknown. One theory is that they may be associated with a private tomb. Wadi D-3 is now "mostly blocked and badly eroded" leaving its visitation status in question.
Wadi D-4	1988	Anonymous	Unknown	Wadi D-4 was discovered and excavated by the Metropolitan Museum of Art in 1988. While the pit contained a "Thutmoside Foundation deposit", Chamber B is a subsidiary burial due to its "careful cutting and size". Various artifacts from the 18th Dynasty to the Roman Coptic period were discovered in both. In the time following its original purpose regular floods in the wadi deposited debris and objects from Wadi D-1 and other areas into Wadi D-4.

== See also ==
- List of burials in the Valley of the Kings
- List of Theban tombs
- Theban Mapping Project
