= Tomb of Thutmose II =

Ancient Egyptian tomb

Wadi C-4
- Burial site of Thutmose II
- Floor plan of tomb Wadi C-4

- Location within Egypt
- Coordinates: 25°44′12″N 32°34′42″E
- Location: Wadi Gabbanat el-Qurud, Western Wadis, Egypt
- Discovered: October 2022
- Excavated by: Joint Egyptian-British archaeological expedition (2025)
- Decoration: Book of the Amduat
- Layout: Bent to the left

The Tomb of Thutmose II is a royal ancient Egyptian tomb located in the Wadi Gabbanat el-Qurud area west of Luxor. The tomb, also known by its tomb number C-4, belonged to Thutmose II, a pharaoh of the 16th–15th centuries BC. The tomb lacks Thutmose's mummy, which may have been found in 1881 in the Royal Cache, where many royal coffins were moved in ancient times. There are, however, doubts about the identity of that mummy.

Identified by a joint Egyptian–British archaeological expedition, the tomb was discovered during clearance work searching for foundation deposits. A softness in the surface, identified by Ashraf Omar Ali and Heraji Sayed Ahmed, led to the team, headed by Piers Litherland, uncovering the entrance to the tomb on 31st October, 2022. It discovery was announced in a preliminary report in the following year.

== Discovery ==
The tomb was discovered during broader archaeological work conducted across the Western Wadis, near the Nile in southern Egypt. Initial exploration began in October 2022 with the discovery of its entrance and main passage in Wadi C west of Luxor, designated as Wadi C-4. The tomb was believed to have remained sealed since the Third Intermediate Period. Repeated flooding filled the main axis with densely packed debris that had hardened to a concrete-like consistency. This also compromised the structural integrity of the tomb's ceilings, resulting in partial collapses.

The archaeological team of the New Kingdom Research Foundation originally suspected the tomb belonged to a royal wife due to its proximity to the tombs of three wives of Thutmose III and Hatshepsut's intended burial site before she became king. Meticulous excavations continued for nearly three years before the tomb's royal ownership was confirmed.

The Egyptian Ministry of Tourism and Antiquities claimed that this was the first discovery of a pharaoh's tomb since the tomb of Tutankhamun in 1922. However, several royal tombs had been discovered since Tutankhamun's, such as that of Psusennes I (Third Intermediate Period) in 1940 and that of Senebkay (Second Intermediate Period) in 2014. Thutmose II's tomb was however, the first royal tomb from the New Kingdom discovered since that of Tutankhamun.

== Design and architecture ==
The tomb exhibits a simple architectural design characteristic of the period following Thutmose II's reign, which influenced the burial structures of subsequent Egyptian rulers. The tomb is located at the opposite end of the Theban mountain to the Valley of the Kings previously associated with the burials of royal wives. The tomb was built around an early variation of a left-turning bent axis design that became standard for later Eighteenth Dynasty royal tombs.

The tomb has three larger chambers, labelled A, B, D by the excavators. Chamber C is a smaller one, next to chamber B. Chamber A (5.3 m × 5.2 m or 17 ft × 17 ft and 3.4 m or 11 ft high) is the innermost and largest one that was once decorated, but only small parts of the decoration are preserved, mainly in the corners. Archaeologists have determined that it is very likely to have been the burial chamber of the tomb. There are two corridors, Corridor 1 is the main one forming the entrance and leading to chamber D. Corridor 2 is a later addition. It starts on the west side of Corridor 1 and goes to the main chamber A where it enters the room 1.7 m above floor level.

The "unusual" second corridor features a white gypsum plaster finishing and exhibited evidence of two enlargement phases. Unlike typical tomb corridors that slope downward, the passage angles upward and intersects with the burial chamber (Chamber A) at a height of 1.4 or 1.7 m (4 ft 7 in or 5 ft 7 in) above the chamber floor. Archaeological evidence suggests this modification served as an emergency egress route after flooding blocked the original corridor.

The tomb's condition was notably compromised, primarily due to flooding that occurred shortly after Thutmose II's interment. Archaeological evidence suggested that after these ancient floods, many of the tomb's original contents were moved to protect them from further damage. Some time in the Third Intermediate Period, Thutmose II's body (CG61066) was moved by the priests of Amun to the Deir el-Bahari Cache, where it was found in 1881. No grave goods of Thutmose II other than those fragments recovered from the C4 tomb are known.

== Contents ==
The tomb's contents included several artefacts that confirmed its royal ownership. Surviving decorative elements included alabaster vessels bearing hieroglyphic inscriptions of Thutmose II's name, referring to him as the Osiris Aakheperenre (a reference to Thutmose II's prenomen), and hieroglyphic inscriptions of his sister-wife, the Great Royal Wife Hatshepsut, suggesting that his burial rites were carried out by Hatshepsut as his son and successor, Thutmose III, was too young at the time to perform them himself. The uncovered artefacts were the first of Thutmose II's funerary furniture to be found. Archaeologists surmised that other objects in the tomb were either destroyed by floods or removed from the flooded tomb to a second tomb. There were no fragments of proper burial goods, but several fragments of pottery vessels, mainly from chambers B and C indicating that a burial took place.

== Decoration ==
Many of the wall decorations have been badly damaged by the flash floods that periodically sweep through the valley. The excavation revealed plastered limestone fragments from the ceiling decorated with blue paint and yellow stars. The tomb also contained portions of the Amduat, a funerary text commonly found in royal tombs of the period intended to guide the deceased king through the night to take his place with the sun in the afterlife. As with the tomb of his son, Thutmose III (KV34), the surviving fragments of the Amduat text is written in the cursive hieroglyphs and follow very closely to those in KV34. Thus, archaeologists surmised that the decoration of the tomb of Thutmose II would have originally resembled that of KV34, the tomb of Thutmose II's son, Thutmose III.

== Bibliography ==
- Litherland, Piers (2023). "Has the Tomb of Thutmose II been found?". Egyptian Archaeology. 63. Egypt Exploration Society: 28–31.
