= Neferure =

Daughter of pharaohs Hatshepsut and Thutmose II

- King's Daughter, God's Wife of Amun
- Neferure on Senenmut's lap (color altered to provide detail)
Egyptian name
< ra nfr nfr nfr B1 >
- Dynasty: 18th Dynasty
- Burial: Tomb in Wady C, Wady Gabbanat el-Qurud
- Spouse: Thutmose III (possibly)
- Father: Thutmose II
- Mother: Hatshepsut
- Children: Amenemhat (possibly)

Neferure or Neferura (Ancient Egyptian: Nfrw-Rꜥ, meaning The Beauty of Re) was an Egyptian princess of the Eighteenth Dynasty of Egypt. She was the daughter of two pharaohs, Hatshepsut and Thutmose II. She served in high offices in the government and the religious administration of Ancient Egypt.

== Family ==
Neferure was the only known child of Thutmose II and his great royal wife Hatshepsut. She was the granddaughter of Thutmose I and the half-sister of Thutmose III. It has been suggested that Neferure married her half-brother, but there is no conclusive evidence of such a marriage. A king’s son named Amenemhat (B) was installed as Overseer of the Cattle in year 24 of the reign of Thutmose III, and this prince may have been a son of Neferure. It has been pointed out however, that if Neferure had become a great royal wife of Thutmose III, she would have been attested with that title, which is not known to be the case.

== Life ==
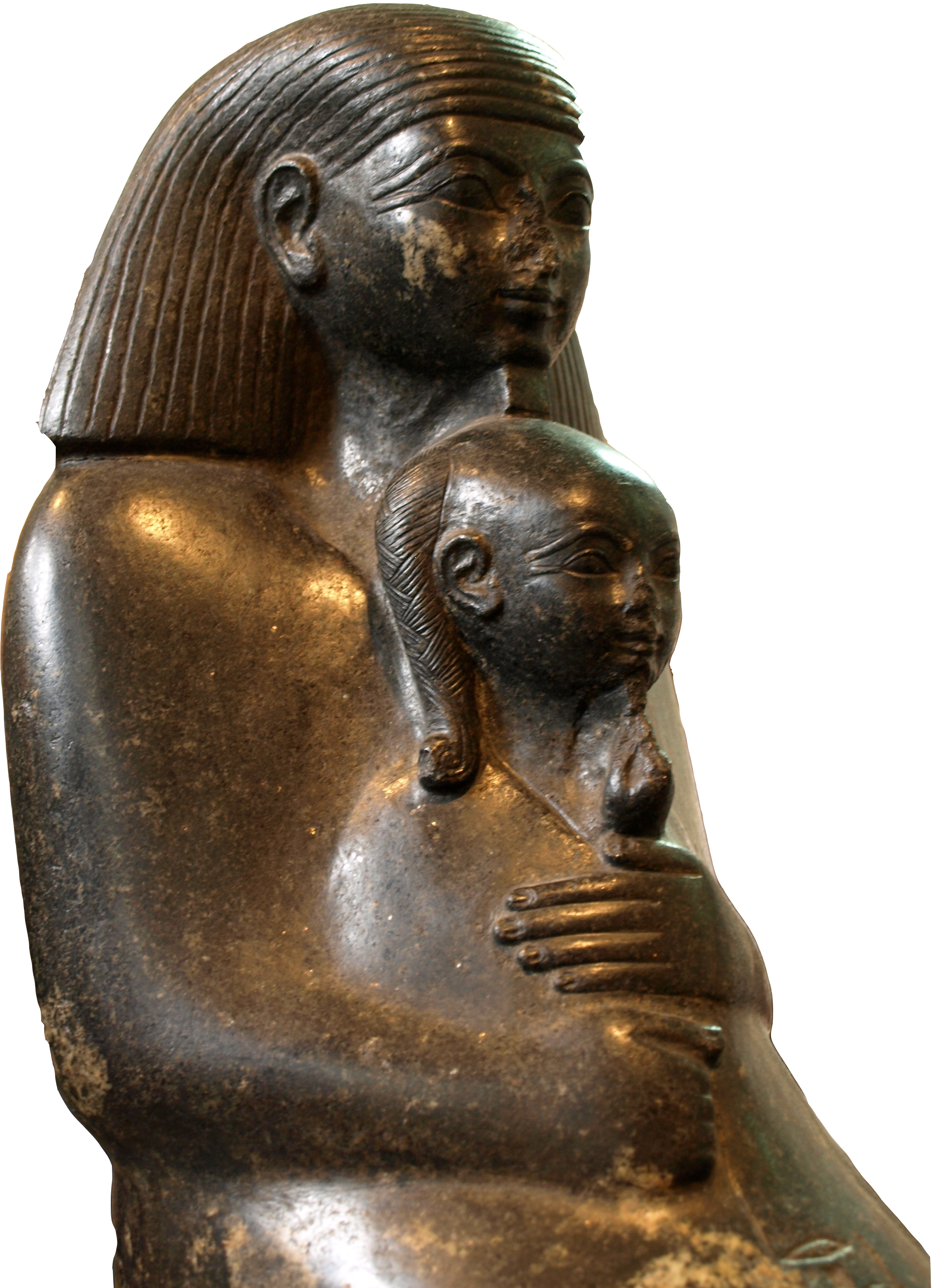
Block statue of the courtier Senenmut holding the princess Neferure in his arms, on display at the British Museum

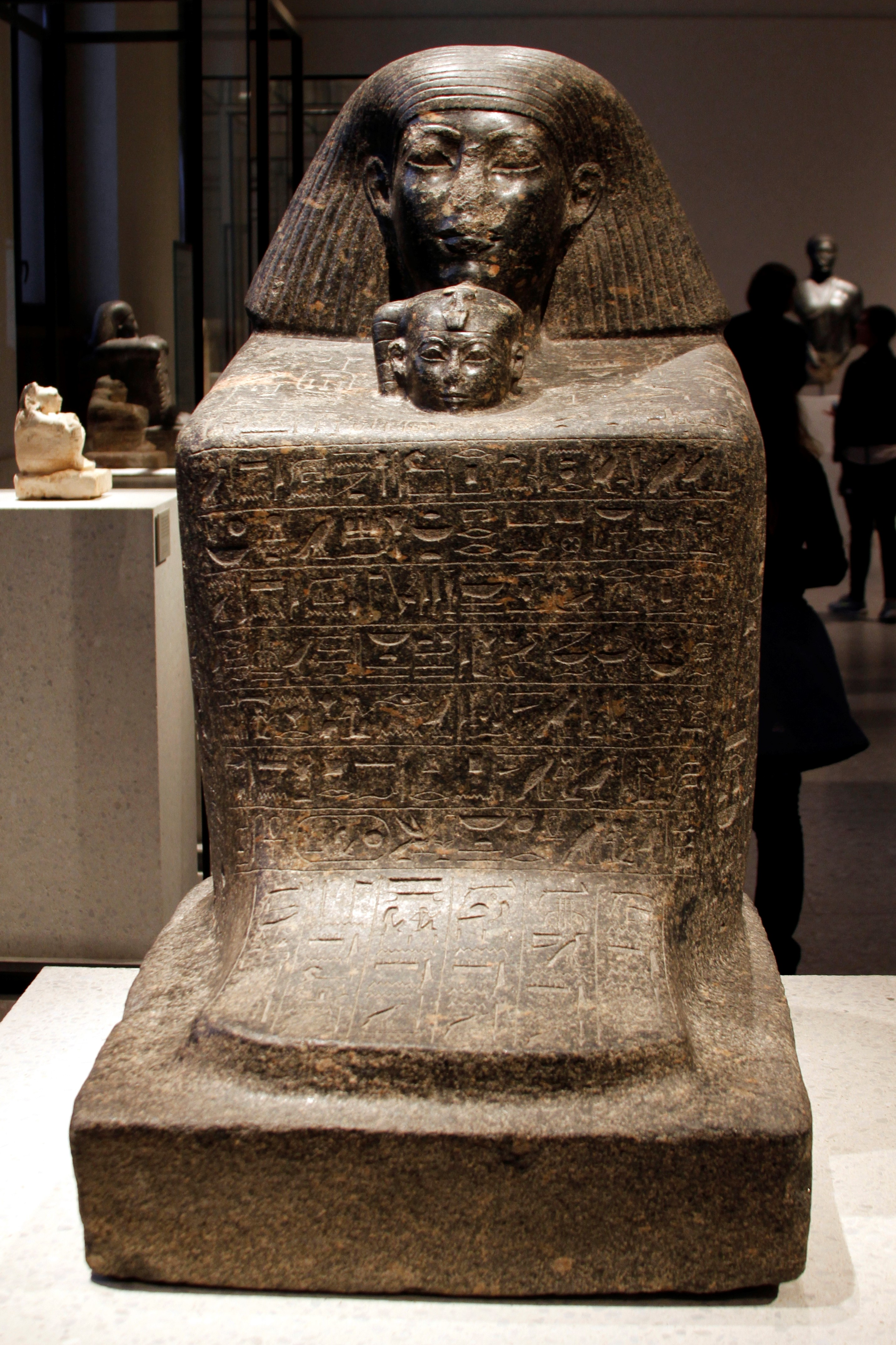
Block statue of Senenmut and Neferure

Neferure was born during the reign of Thutmose II. In Karnak, Neferure is depicted with Thutmose II and Hatshepsut. Thutmose II most likely died after just three years of reign. The heir to the throne, Thutmose III, was only a child and Hatshepsut served as his regent, but by the seventh year of his rule it is well documented that Hatshepsut took on the role of pharaoh and continued to rule until her death, for more than twenty years.

Neferure was tutored by some of Hatshepsut's most trusted advisers, at first Ahmose Pen-Nekhebet, who served under several of the preceding pharaohs and was held in great esteem. In his tomb he claims:

For me the god’s wife repeated favors, the king’s great wife Maatkare justified; I brought up her eldest (daughter), the princess Neferura, justified, while she was (still) a child at the breast.

Neferure’s next tutor was Senenmut. Senenmut is known from many statues depicting him with his young charge. In all these statues Senenmut is shown wearing a long cloak. Seven statues are block statues in which the head of Princess Neferure pokes out of the block. One statue shows Neferura seated on his lap, while in another statue Senenmut is shown seated with one leg pulled up and Neferure leaning against his leg. After Hatshepsut became regent, Senenmut became her advisor and the role of tutor for Neferure was handed over to the administrator Senimen.

Following her mother's accession to the Egyptian throne, Neferure had an unusually prominent role in the court, exceeding the normal role played by a royal princess to the pharaoh. As Hatshepsut took on the role of pharaoh, Neferure took on a queenly role in public life. Many depictions of her in these roles exist. She was given the titles Lady of Upper and Lower Egypt, Mistress of the Lands, and God's Wife of Amun; the latter title being one that Hatshepsut had to abandon upon becoming pharaoh. These offices had to be filled by a royal woman in order to fulfill the religious and ceremonial duties, normally of the queen, in the government and the temples. The interpretation of one scene depicted on Hatshepsut's Chapelle Rouge (Red Chapel) in the Karnak temple depicts her fulfilling the rituals required of God's Wife of Amun. Perhaps significantly, this royal title had been held by several queens of her dynasty including her mother, and this woman played an important role in temple rituals with the pharaoh.

Neferure is depicted on a stela from Serabit el-Khadim in the Sinai dated to year 11. The stela shows Senenmut and Neferure. The year is given at the top of the stela, but no mention is made of the name of the pharaoh.

Since Neferure is depicted in her mother's funeral temple, there are some authors who believe that Neferure was still alive in the first few years of Thutmose III's rule as pharaoh, and that his eldest son, Amenemhat, was her child. However, there is no concrete evidence to prove that she outlived her mother into Thutmose III's reign. Peter Dorman has argued that a sphinx of a queen dated to the reign of Thutmose III depicts Neferure as a queen. There are however no inscriptions that prove or disprove this proposed identification. It is not clear if Neferure married her half-brother Thutmose III or not. While there are no statues of Thutmose III and Neferure as a brother-sister pair or as husband or wife, this may be a result of Thutmose III's systemic destruction of images and inscriptions relating to Hatshepsut and Neferure. Historian Kara Cooney has argued that in Neferure's assumption of the post of God's Wife of Amun and a dramatic increase in political authority thanks to Hatshepsut's kingship had upset the balance of patriarchal power in a drastic way. Neferure's presence has been all but obliterated from the material record, however one Egyptologist has attributed a large relief in the Mortuary Temple of Hatshepsut originally depicted Neferure but was later modified to depict Hatshepsut's mother Ahmes.

== Death ==
It is possible that Neferure died during the reign of her mother. She is mentioned in Senenmut's first tomb, which he had built in Regnal Year 7. Neferure is also depicted on a Year 11 stela in Serabit el-Khadim, but is completely absent from Senenmut's second tomb, which dates to Year 16 of Hatshepsut. No record has been found recording that she married Thutmose III, however, there is research that suggests that she did and was the mother of his eldest son. On two depictions the name Satiah is recorded as the wife of Thutmose, and seems to have replaced that of Neferure, which had been the original name recorded; one of the depictions is associated with the title “Great Royal Wife”, the other with “God's Wife”, a title which Satiah does bear later on other inscriptions. All of the titles associated with Neferure are not found ascribed to Satiah however.

=== Burial and tomb ===
A tomb thought to be constructed for her was found atop a sheer cliff by archeologist Howard Carter in Wady C of Wady Gabbanat el-Qurud, part of the Western Wadis associated with the Valley of the Queens. The connection of this tomb to Neferure is based on the presence of a weathered vertical cartouche containing her name cut into the cliff below the tomb entrance. The tomb itself consists of a passageway that leads to an elongated chamber, a second corridor leads off to the right ending in a bay and a niche; it was found to be mostly empty. It was noted that the tomb had been used, however, since the ceiling was smoothed and the walls plastered; traces of ochre and yellow paints could be defined. The archaeologists who inspected the tomb were certain that Neferure had not outlived her mother, Hatshepsut. Alternatively, her tomb may have been in Wady A, close to the tomb quarried for Hatshepsut as Great Royal Wife.
