= QV30 =

Ancient Egyptian tomb in the Valley of the Queens

Theban tomb QV30
- Burial site of Nebiri
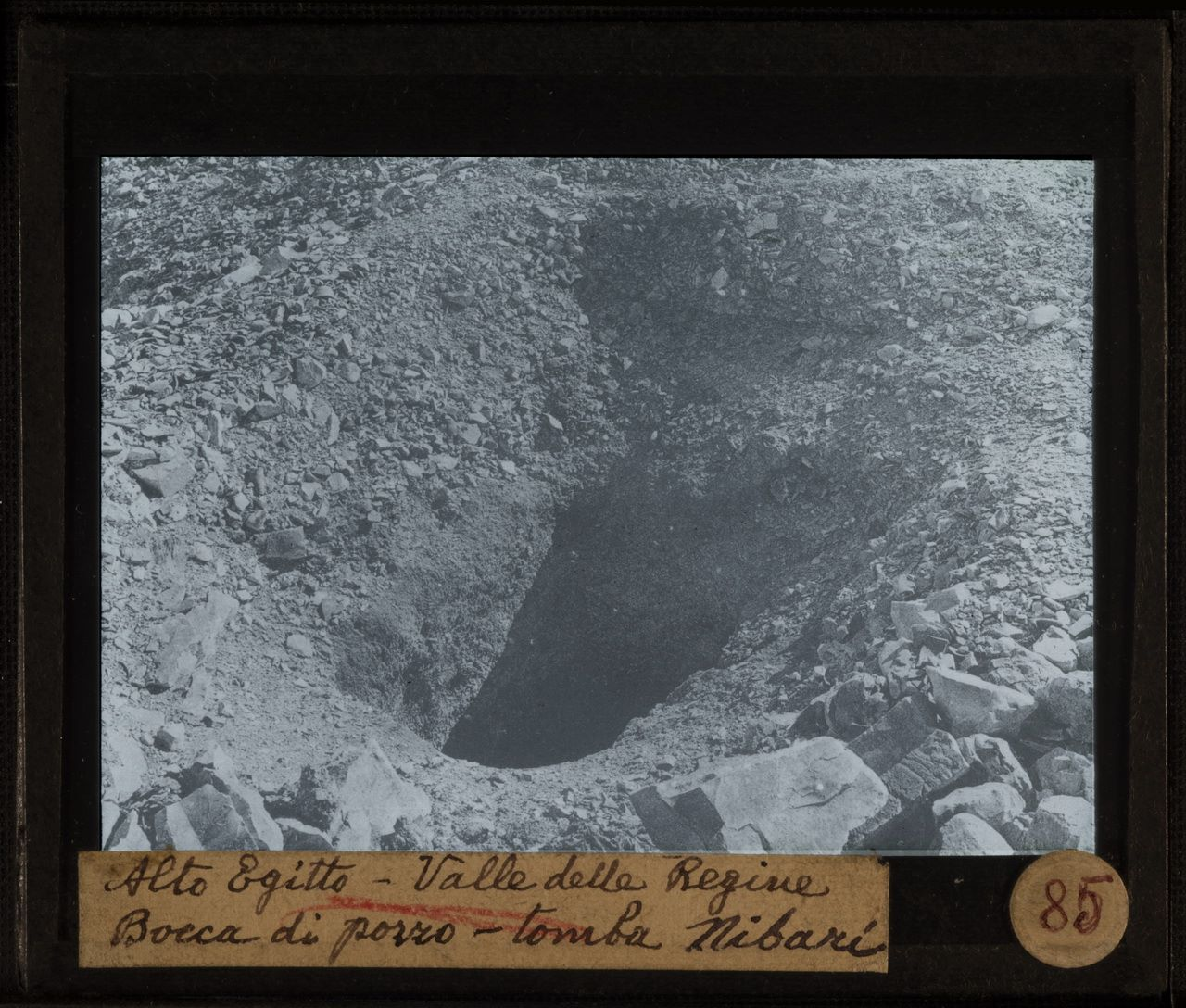
- Opening of the shaft leading to the tomb of Nebiri, QV30, in the Valley of the Queens; image from the Photographic Archive of the Museo Egizio, Turin (MAFM 0276).

- Coordinates: 25.7333°N 32.6°E
- Location: Valley of the Queens, Theban Necropolis, Theban Necropolis
- Discovered: 1904
- Excavated by: Ernesto Schiaparelli
- Decoration: Undecorated
- Layout: Vertical shaft and single rectangular chamber
- ← Previous; QV29 Next → QV31

QV30, also known as the tomb of Nebiri, is an ancient Egyptian tomb in the Valley of the Queens, in the Theban Necropolis, on the west bank of the Nile opposite Luxor, Egypt. It was cut during the Eighteenth Dynasty for Nebiri, overseer of the royal stables under Thutmose III.

== History ==
QV30 was built during the Eighteenth Dynasty as the burial of Nebiri, overseer of the royal stables of Thutmose III; the tomb was probably robbed soon after it was made. The tomb was later reused in the Roman period.

=== Excavation and documentation ===
QV30 was discovered in 1904 by the Italian Archaeological Expedition directed by Ernesto Schiaparelli, who found that it had already been robbed. Schiaparelli was able to identify the owner from the canopic jars found in the burial, which are preserved in the Museo Egizio in Turin.

The tomb was mapped by the Theban Mapping Project in 1981. In 1986 it was surveyed and documented by a Franco-Egyptian mission of the CNRS and the Supreme Council of Antiquities. Between 2006 and 2008 it was also documented by a joint mission of the Getty Conservation Institute and the Supreme Council of Antiquities.

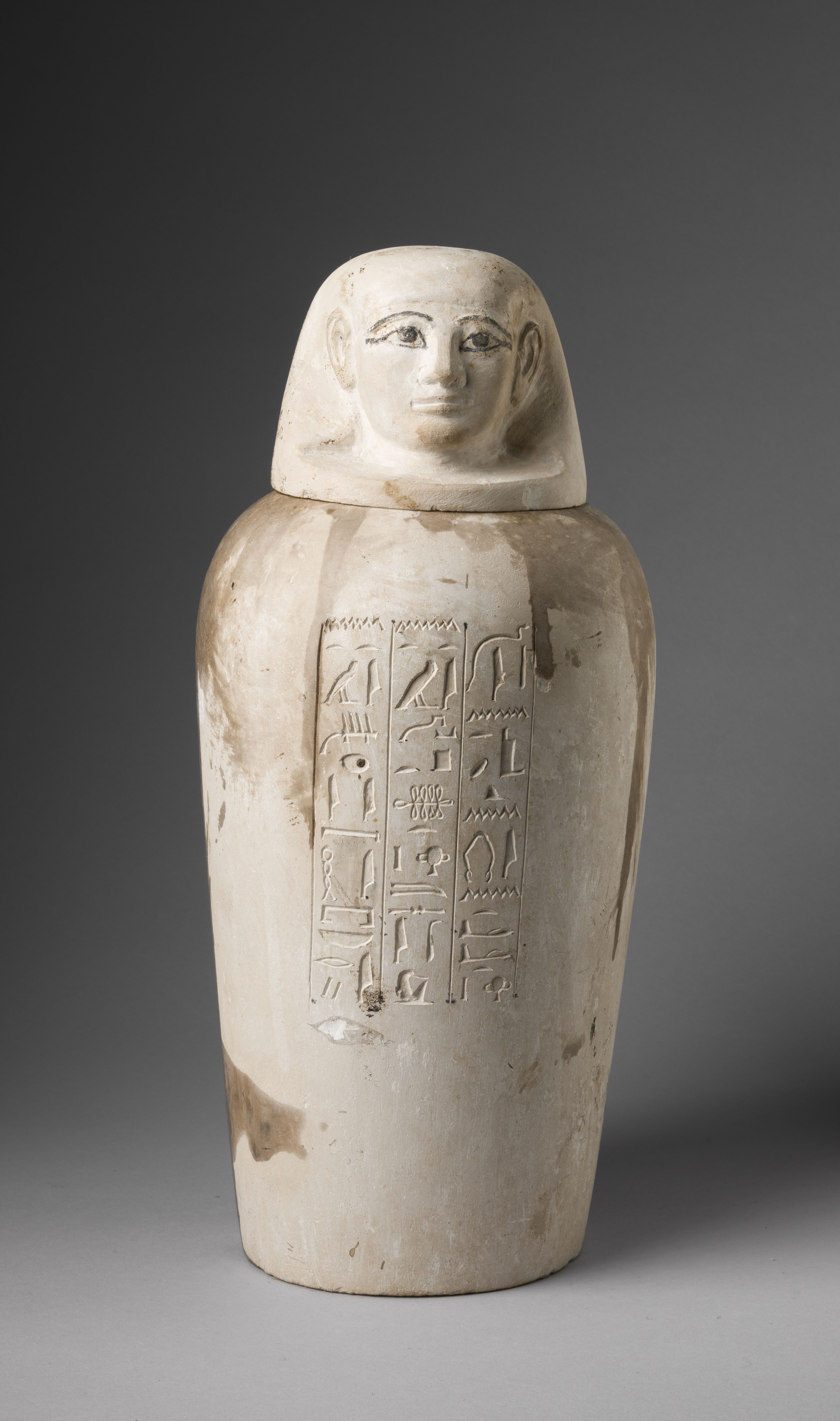
Canopic jar of Nebiri with human-headed lid, limestone, Museo Egizio, Turin (Suppl. 5110).

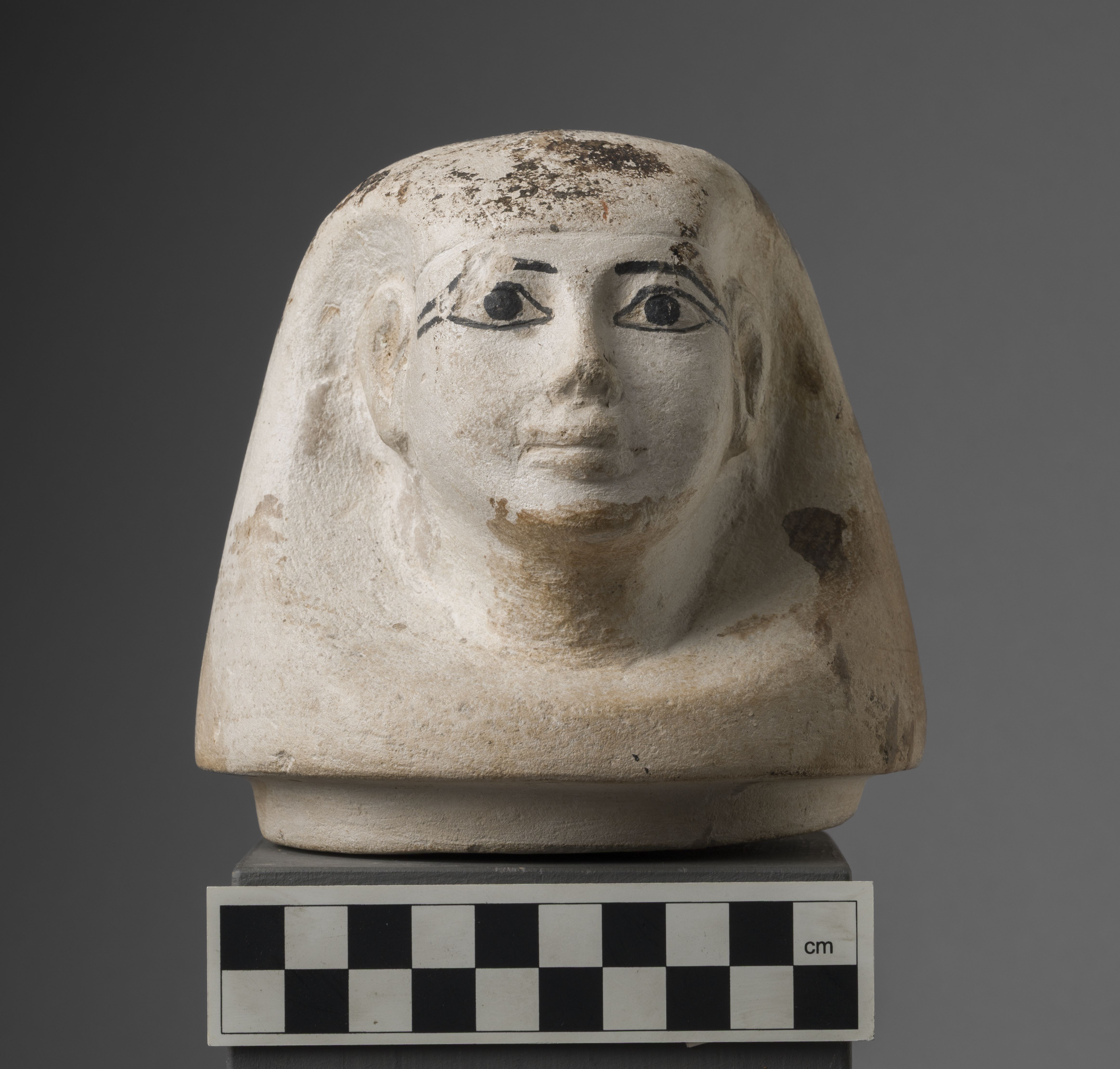
Human-headed canopic jar lid, limestone, Museo Egizio, Turin (Suppl. 5111/01).

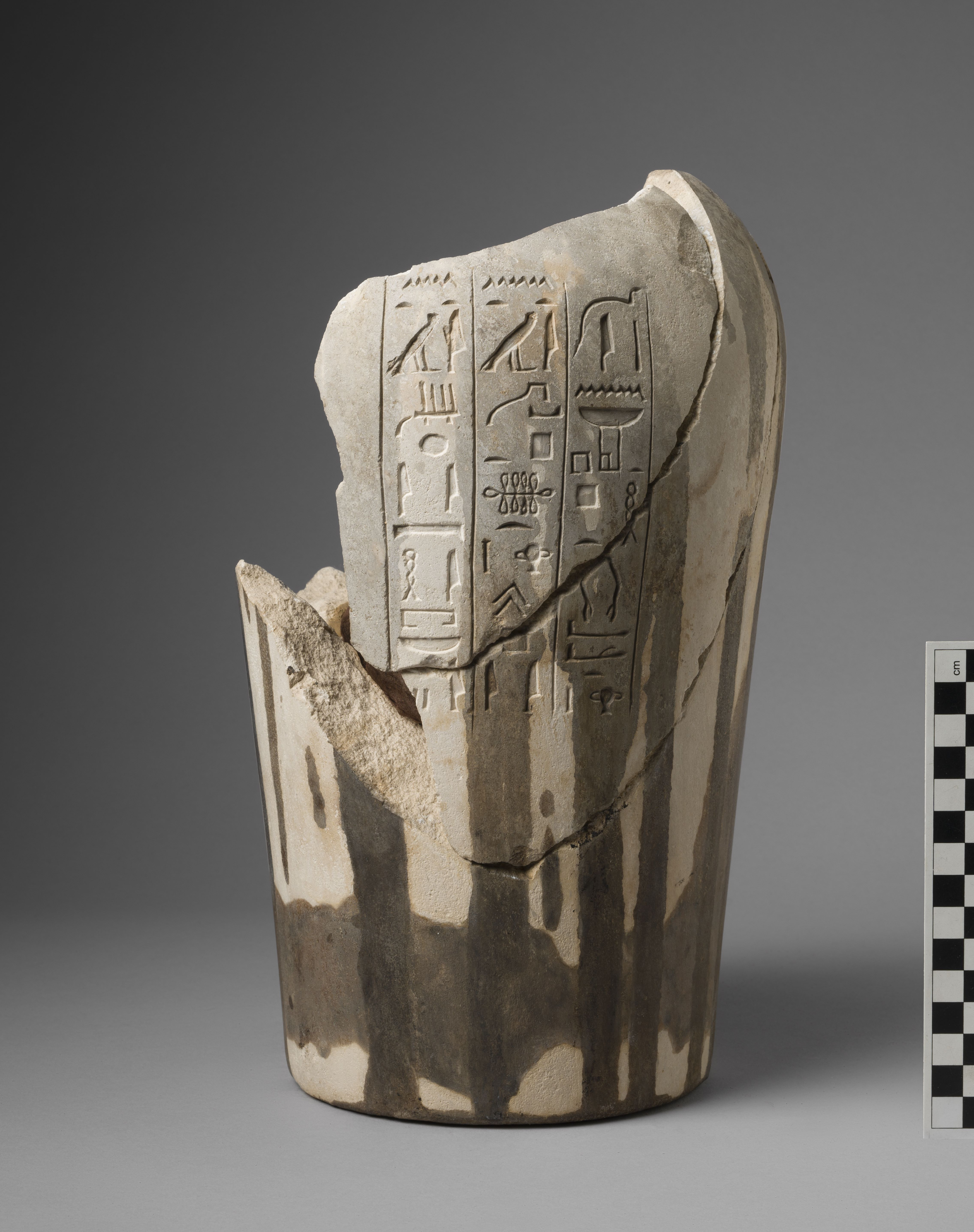
Canopic jar, limestone, Museo Egizio, Turin (Suppl. 5111/02).

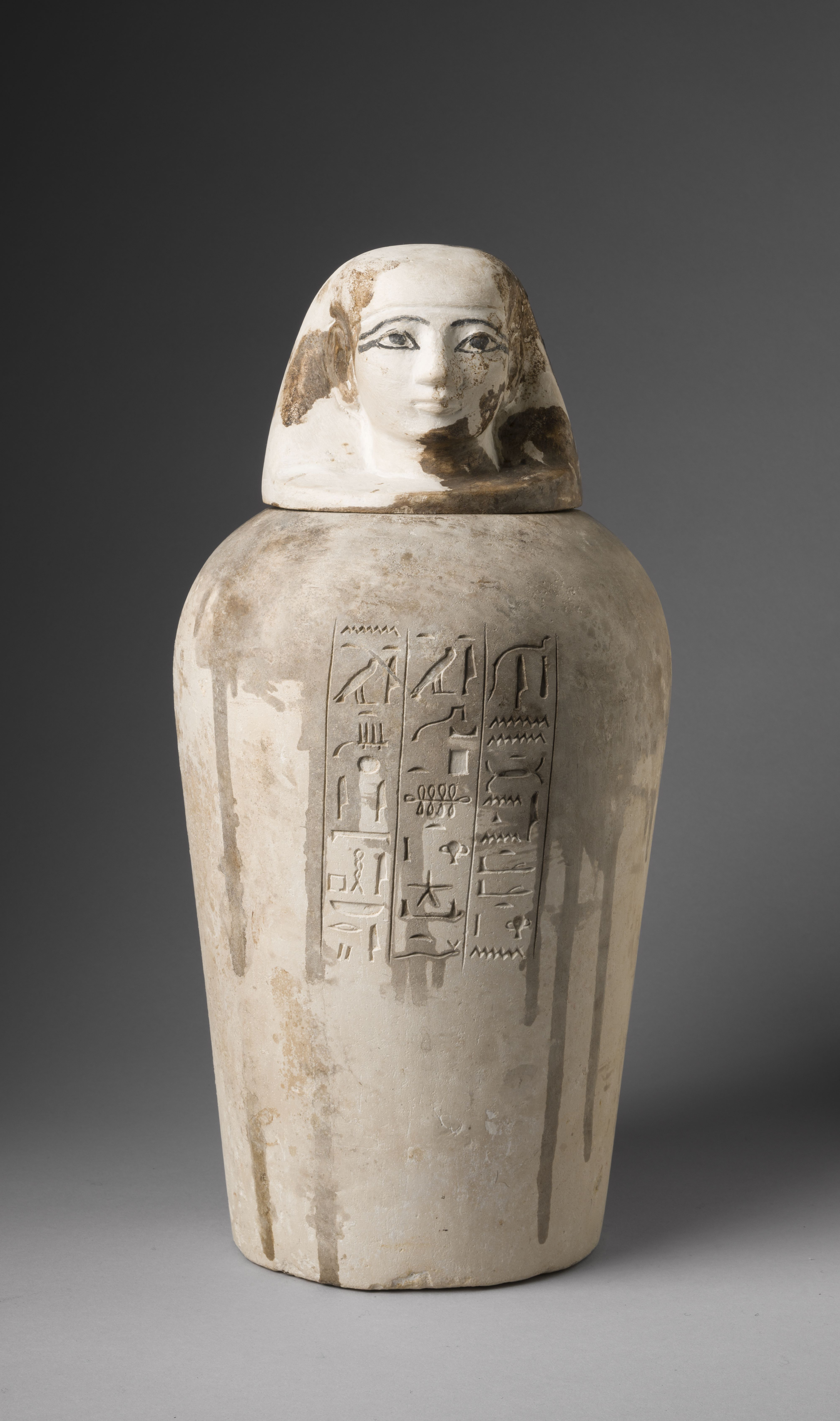
Canopic jar with human-headed lid, limestone, Museo Egizio, Turin (Suppl. 5112).

== Description ==
QV30 is located on the south slope of the main valley of the Valley of the Queens. The tomb consists of a vertical shaft and a single rectangular chamber, identified as chamber B in the documentation of the Theban Mapping Project. The entrance is at the base of a sloping hill, the interior plan consists of a straight-axis chamber, and the tomb is undecorated.

QV30 is cut into shale. The rock of the tomb is extensively fractured, and the poor quality of the rock is identified as the principal cause of deterioration of the burial place.

The shaft entrance is surrounded by a modern cemented masonry structure with a metal grill.

=== Conservation condition ===
In the front part of chamber B, a thick layer of cracked, dried mud is recorded on the floor, showing that water had entered the tomb in the past. After the assessment carried out in December 2009 by the Getty Conservation Institute and the Supreme Council of Antiquities, the tomb was judged to be structurally sound. The tomb opening is in a position exposed to runoff from the slope above it.

== Finds ==
Fragments of two mummies came from the tomb, one believed to be Nebiri and the other possibly one of his servants, together with objects made of Egyptian faience, vessels and pottery. The mummy fragments attributed to Nebiri are preserved in the Museo Egizio in Turin (Suppl. 5109).

Five canopic jars were found in the tomb, four of them made of terracotta and one inscribed. The canopic jars allowed Schiaparelli to attribute the tomb to Nebiri. The pottery recovered from the tomb is in Aegean and Cypriote style and helped Schiaparelli date the burial.

Objects from the tomb of Nebiri are preserved in the Museo Egizio in Turin, including limestone and terracotta canopic jars, jar fragments, and a jug with a clay stopper lined with layers of linen.

A study published in 2022 in the journal Molecules analysed the embalmed head of Nebiri, preserved in the Museo Egizio in Turin, and the canopic jar containing his lungs. The study used non-invasive methods to characterise proteins and organic compounds connected with Nebiri's funerary treatment, identifying animal fats, glues, balms, essential oils, aromatic plants, heated Pistacia resins and conifer resins among the ingredients of the preparation.

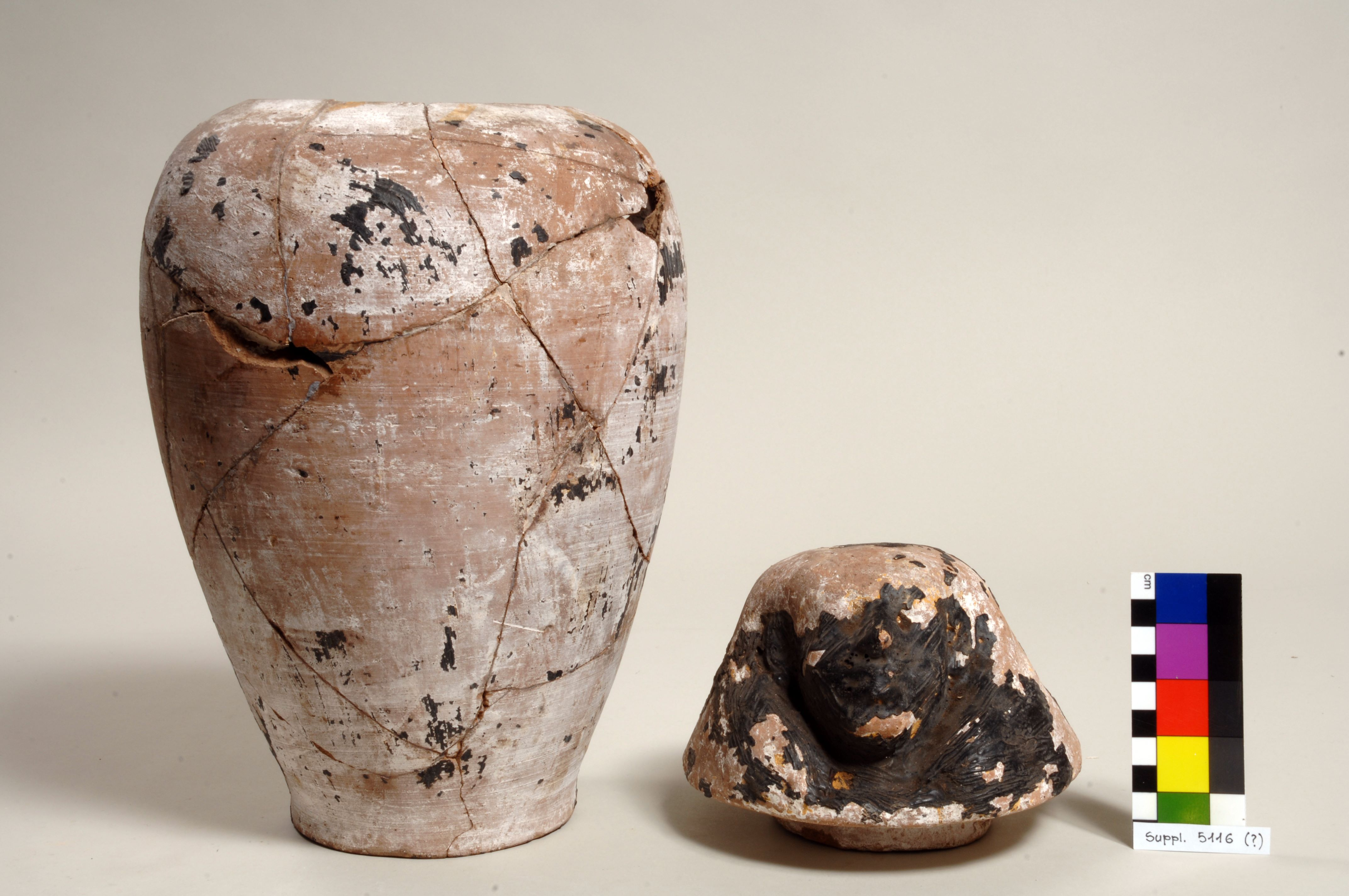
Canopic jar with human-headed lid, terracotta, Museo Egizio, Turin (Suppl. 5116/?).

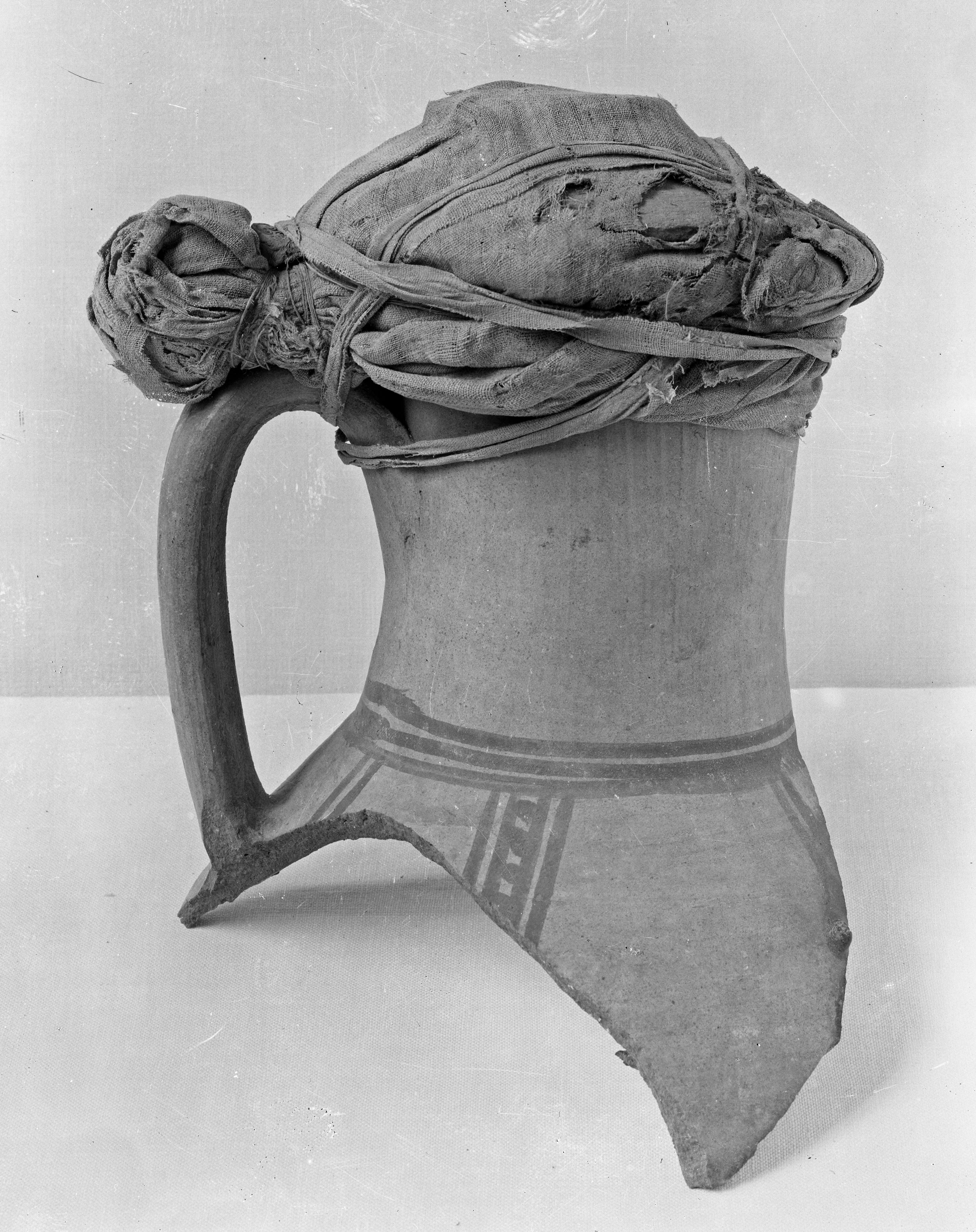
Jug with clay stopper lined with layers of linen, clay, vegetable fibre, terracotta and linen, Museo Egizio, Turin (Suppl. 5124).

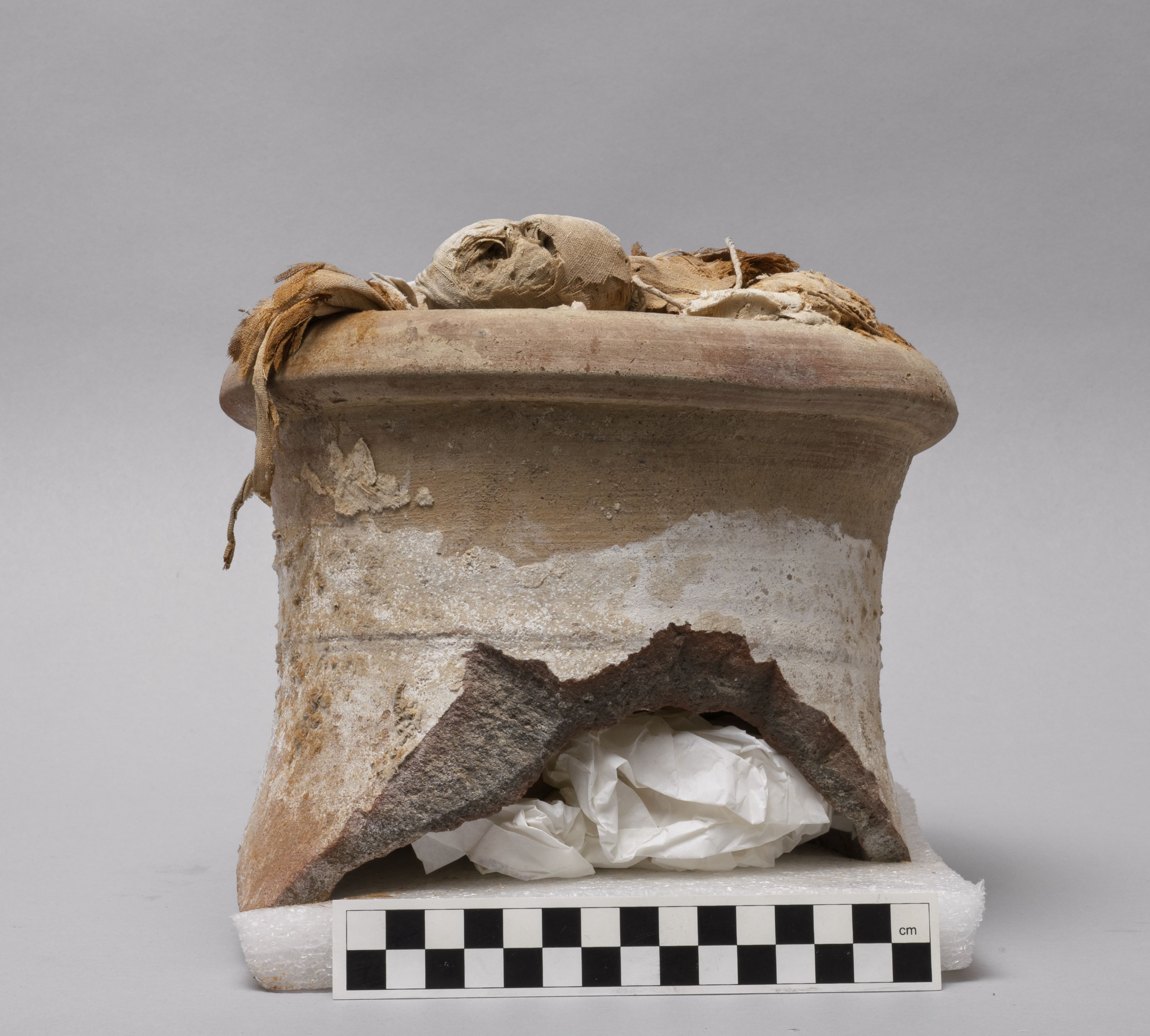
Jar fragment in clay, vegetable fibre, terracotta and linen, Museo Egizio, Turin (Suppl. 5114).

== See also ==
- List of burials in the Valley of the Queens
