= Senimen =

Senimen was an ancient Egyptian official who lived at the beginning of the 18th Dynasty and who was tutor of the king's daughter Neferure. The latter had an exceptionally high status under the ruling queen Hatshepsut (about 1507–1458 BC).

Senimen is known from several sources. A funerary cone preserves a number of titles, that make it possible to reconstruct his career. On the cone he appears as child of the harem (kap) of Nebpehtyre. Nebpehtyre is the throne name of king Ahmose. The title indicates that Senimen grew up under this king. On the cone, three further titles are listed. They all relate to his position as teacher or tutor of Neferure. Senimen was called teacher of the god's body of the god's wife Neferure, nurse of the daughter of the god's wife Hatshepsut and steward of the king's daughter. Senimen was evidently at one point in his career appointed to become the teacher of Neferure. He was also administrator of Neferure's domains. The timing of this appointment is unclear. There are two other officials that were tutors of Neferure too. These are Ahmose Pen-Nekhebet and Senenmut. Senimen must have been quite old in the reign of Hatshepsut, so it has been suggested that he was appointed already before Hatshepsut became ruling queen and when Thutmose II was still king.

Senimen was buried in Theban tomb TT252. The tomb is heavily destroyed. Over the entrance is carved into the rocks a group of statues, showing Senimen as sitting on the ground and holding Neferure and a woman standing next to them. Not much is known about his family. His mother was a woman called Senemiah. Previously it has been assumed that Senimen was the brother of the influential official Senenmut, but now this seems unlikely. However, both seem to have family relations, as Senimen and his mother are depicted in the tomb chapel of Senenmut.
