= Deir el-Roumi =

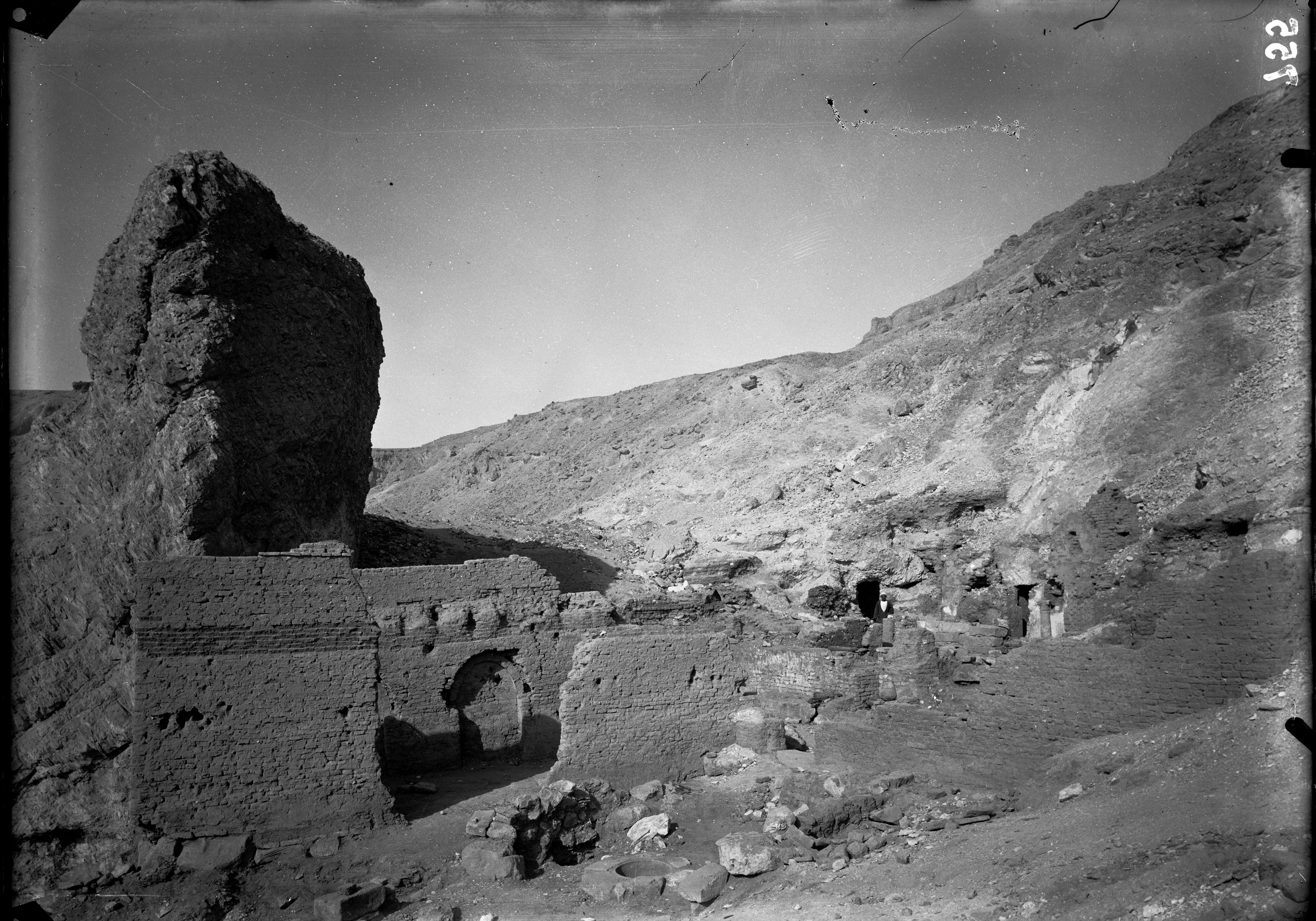
- Ruins of the temple in the 1900s

- Location within Egypt
- 25°43′43″N 32°35′41″E
- Type: Egyptian temple Coptic monastery
- Periods: Roman Egypt
- Cultures: Ancient Egypt; Coptic Orthodox Church
- Location: Valley of the Queens, Egypt
- Part of: Theban Necropolis

History
- Built: 2nd century
- Built by: Antoninus Pius
- Abandoned: c. 7th–8th century

Site notes
- Material: Sandstone, fired brick, mudbrick
- Excavation dates: 1903–1906 (Italian mission); 1988-1994 & 2007-2008 (French mission)
- Archaeologists: Ernesto Schiaparelli; Guy Lecuyot

Deir el-Roumi (Arabic: دير الرومي / “Monastery of the Romans”) is an ancient Egyptian temple dedicated to the worship of Montu. It was built during the 2nd century by the Roman emperor Antoninus Pius in the Valley of the Queens, near Luxor. Following the spread of Christianity, the temple was converted into a Coptic monastery.

== Description ==
The temple of Deir el-Roumi is located in the Valley of the Queens within the Theban Necropolis, on the west bank of the Nile, opposite the city of Luxor (ancient Thebes). Deir el-Roumi was constructed at the place known as Bab el-Hagi-Hamid, at the junction between the main valley of the Valley of the Queens and the secondary valleys known as the Valley of the Rope and the Valley of the Three Pits. The site had previously been occupied by the older tomb QV95.

The building stands halfway up the slope between the rocky cliff of the Theban mountain and a detached rocky spur, forming a promontory overlooking Medinet Habu and the Nile valley below. The mountainside between the cliff (to the north) and the spur (to the south) was levelled to allow construction.

=== Pharaonic temple ===
Construction of the temple took place in two phases. First, the main sanctuary was created by transforming tomb QV95 into a speos. The sanctuary consists of a long rectangular hall surrounded by four small niches cut into the side walls. The entrance, located to the south, is formed by a monumental sandstone doorway. In front of the sanctuary, the most unusual structure of the temple was erected: a circular mound 4.5 meters in diameter and 1.5 meters high, built from rounded sandstone blocks bonded with gypsum mortar. This structure has been identified as a sacred mound and probably originally contained soil and vegetation. Although such structures were known from artistic depictions, this is the only archeologically attested example. The main entrance of the temple was located south of the sacred mound. In a second phase, an “offering court” was added between the sanctuary and the mound.

Various decorative elements such as columns and sphinxes adorned the temple. The walls and doors were decorated with inscriptions and divine representations. The doors were coated, painted, and gilded with gold leaf.

=== Christian monastery ===
Construction of the monastery began with the conversion of the former offering court into a church. A breach was opened in one of the walls to create a semi-domed-apse, flanked on both sides by sandstone columns. Access to the former sanctuary and tomb QV95 was sealed. Stones taken from the former sacred mound, as well as from other sites such as Deir el-Bahari and Deir el-Medina, were reused in the construction of the church, which was topped by a dome.

Later, several fired-brick rooms were built south of the church on the site formerly occupied by the sacred mound, including a vestibule and a baptistery. The baptistery contained a large terracotta basin lined with brick masonry, covered with hydraulic mortar and decorated with a relief cross. In a final phase, the unused space between the building and the rocky spur to the south was filled with new mudbrick rooms. A new vestibule became the largest room in the complex. It connected to the earlier vestibule to the north while also giving access to living quarters, service areas, and annex rooms to the west and south.

== History ==
=== Roman temple ===
The temple of Deir el-Roumi was erected in the 2nd century by the Roman emperor and de facto pharaoh of Egypt, Antoninus Pius, “for his father Montu-Re, lord of Heliopolis of the South” (Thebes). The temple was conceived as an extension of the Temple of Amun at Medinet Habu. Its sacred mound in stone appears to have been a replica of the mound of Djeme at Medinet Habu, reproduced within the realm of the dead (in the Valley of the Queens). The mound at Deir el-Roumi was probably regarded as the resting and regenerative place of the primordial gods of the Ogdoad — Nun/Naunet, Kek/Kauket, Heh/Hauhet, and Amun/Amunet — allowing them to reappear at Medinet Habu in the form of the four Montu gods.

Archaeologists discovered a sandstone altar on the site bearing a Greek dedication dating to the reign of Severus Alexander (3rd century). The inscription, made by a neocoros, a sacred herald of Apollo, constitutes the first attestation of this type of liturgical personnel in Egypt. The neocoros would have recited prayers during libations and sacrifices. The presence of this officiant confirms the assimilation of Montu with Apollo in the Theban region.

=== Monastery ===
The exact chronology of the temple’s conversion is unknown, though it appears to have occurred in two stages. First, the temple was intentionally burned and destroyed, probably at the end of the 4th century, during the spread of Christianity in Thebes. In a second phase, probably during the 5th century, the Coptic monastery was established on the ruins of the temple. The original name of the monastery is unknown, which explains why the designation “Deir el-Roumi” eventually became standard.

Deir el-Roumi probably became the central element of a lavra whose activities extended throughout the Valley of the Queens and neighboring valleys, including the Valley of Prince Ahmose, the Valley of the Rope, and the Valley of the Three Pits. This lavra itself may have been attached to a larger institution, possibly the Monastery of Phoibammon at Deir el-Bahari, which appears to have dominated the southern part of Western Thebes.

The monastery was abandoned between the 7th century and the 8th century.

=== Excavations ===
The earliest modern report of Deir el-Roumi dates to the visit of Joseph Bonomi in 1830. At the time, the area was known as Bab el-Hagi-Hamid because local tradition claimed that a holy man named el-Hag Hamid had lived among the ruins.

The site was first excavated in the early 1900s by the Italian archeological mission led by Ernesto Schiaparelli as part of the exploration of the Valley of the Queens. Because of the enormous scope of work in the valley, excavation of the monastery remained rather limited and was barely mentioned in the excavation report.

Photographs of the ruins taken during Schiaparelli’s expedition (1903–1906)

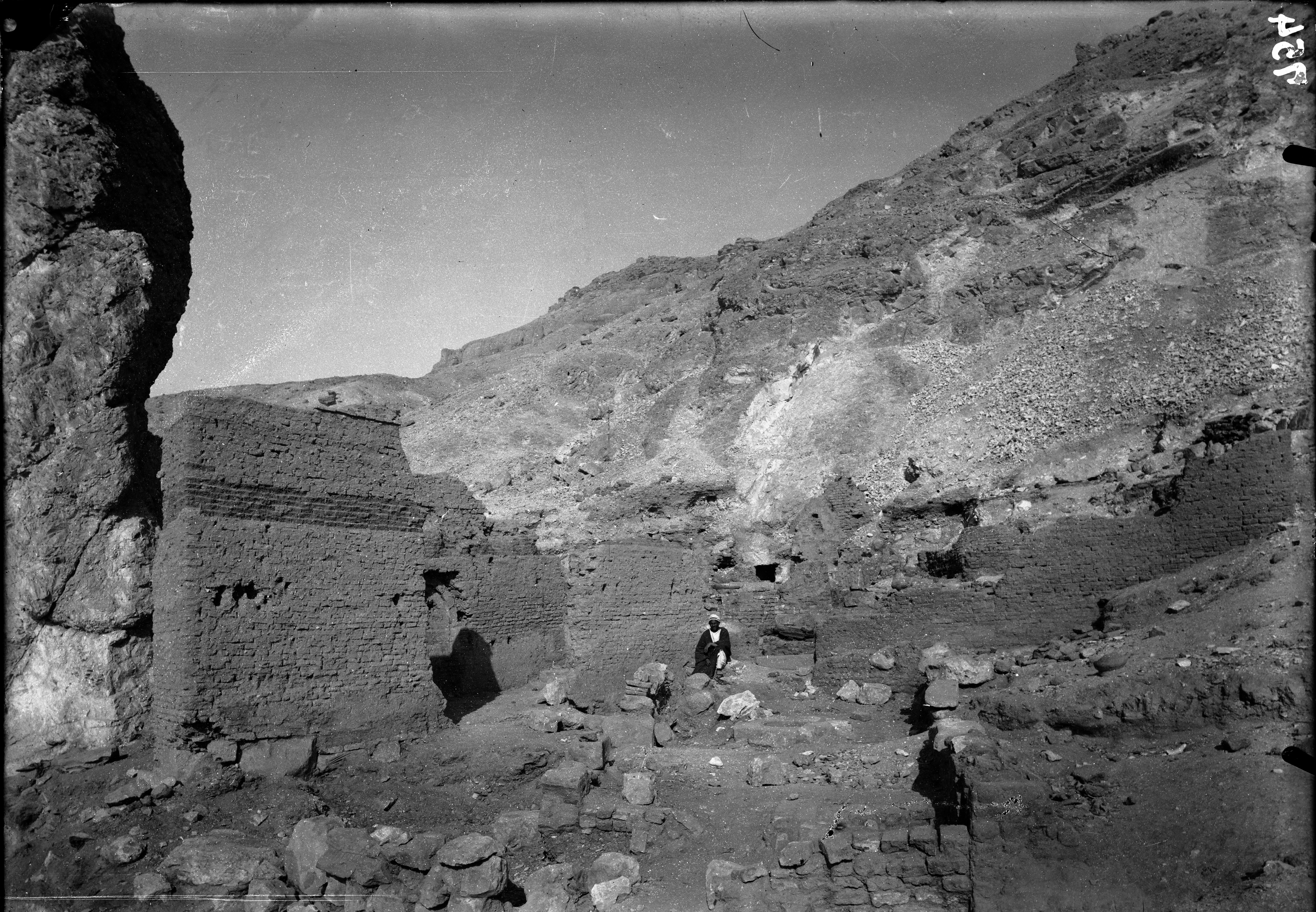

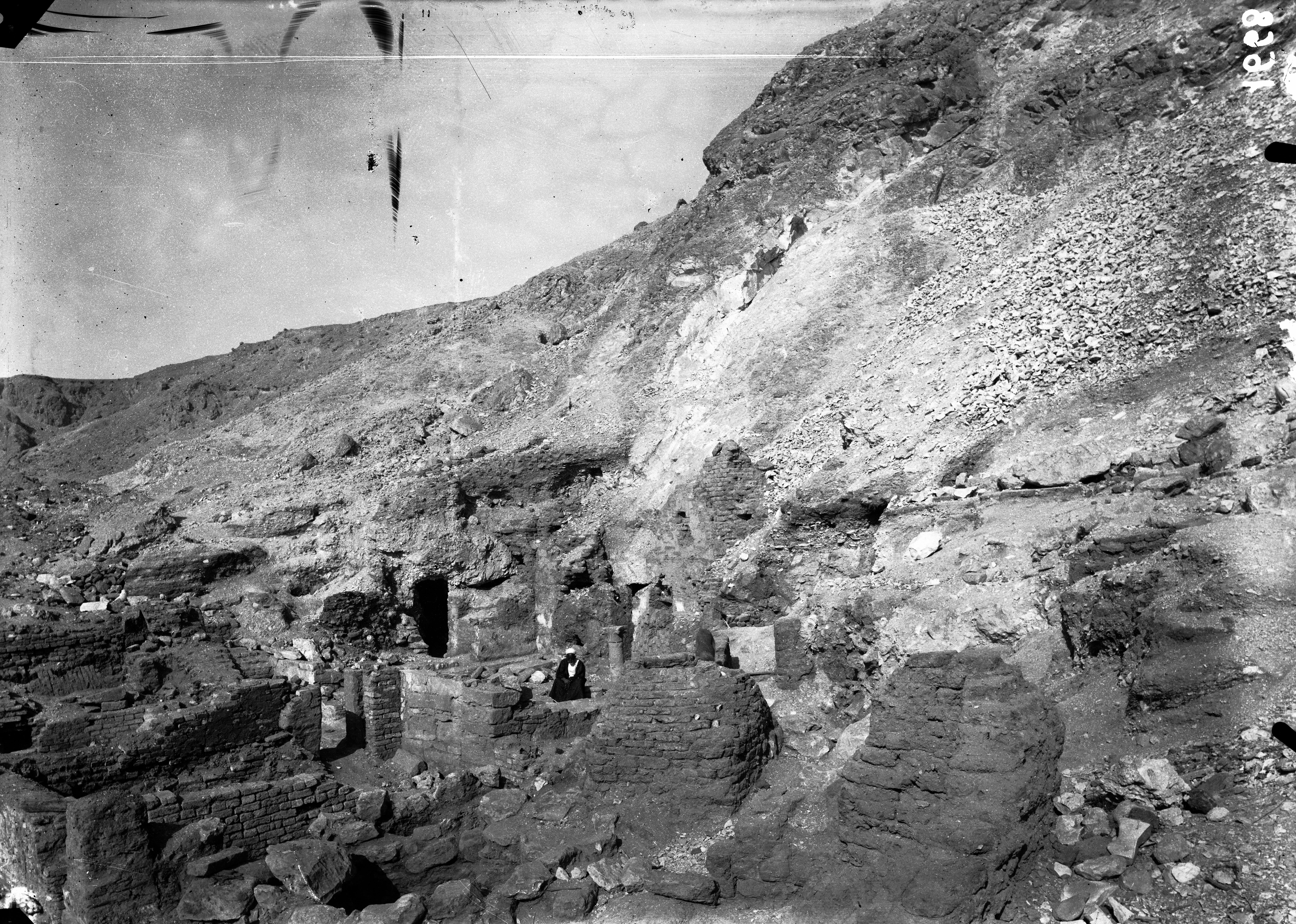

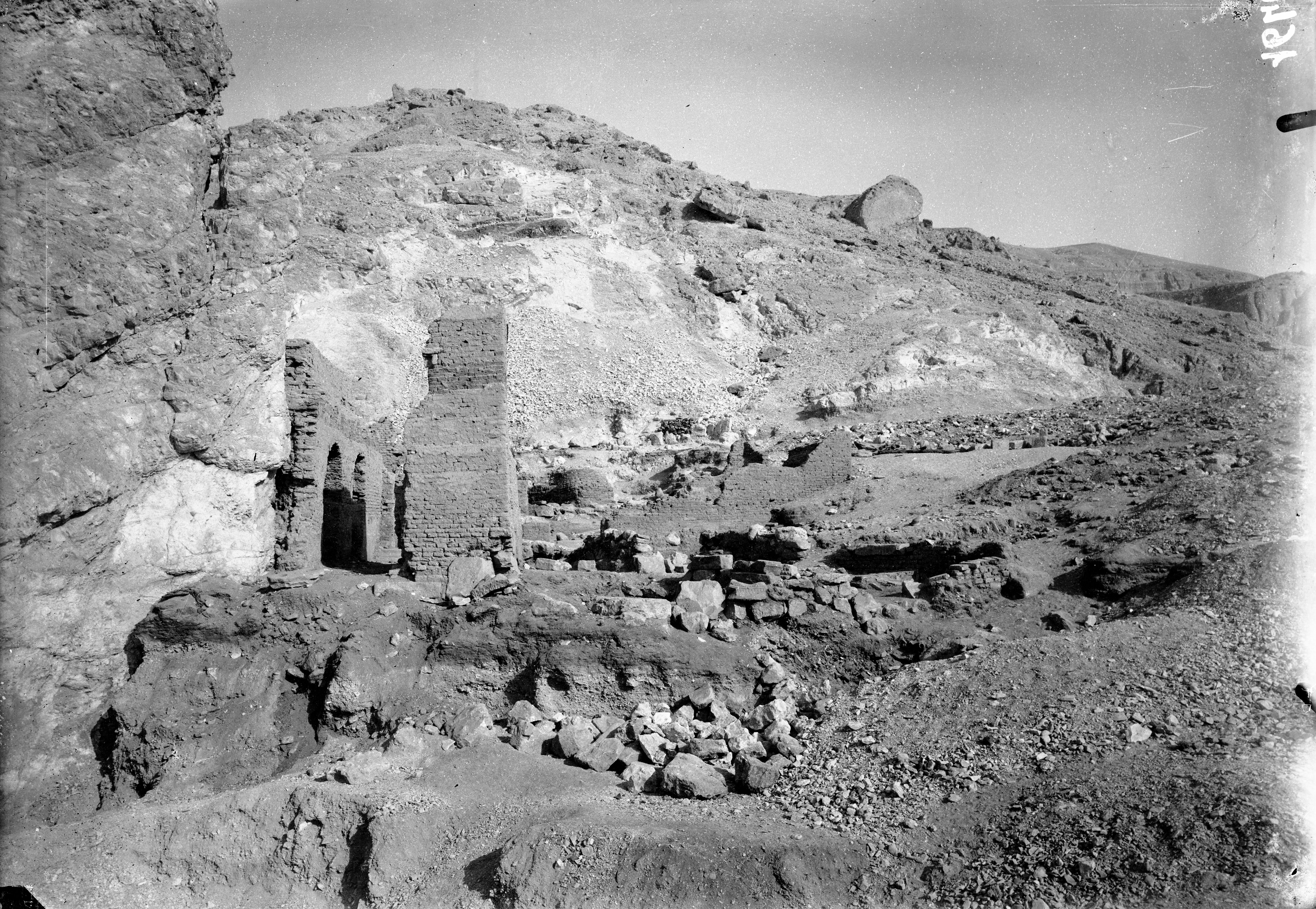

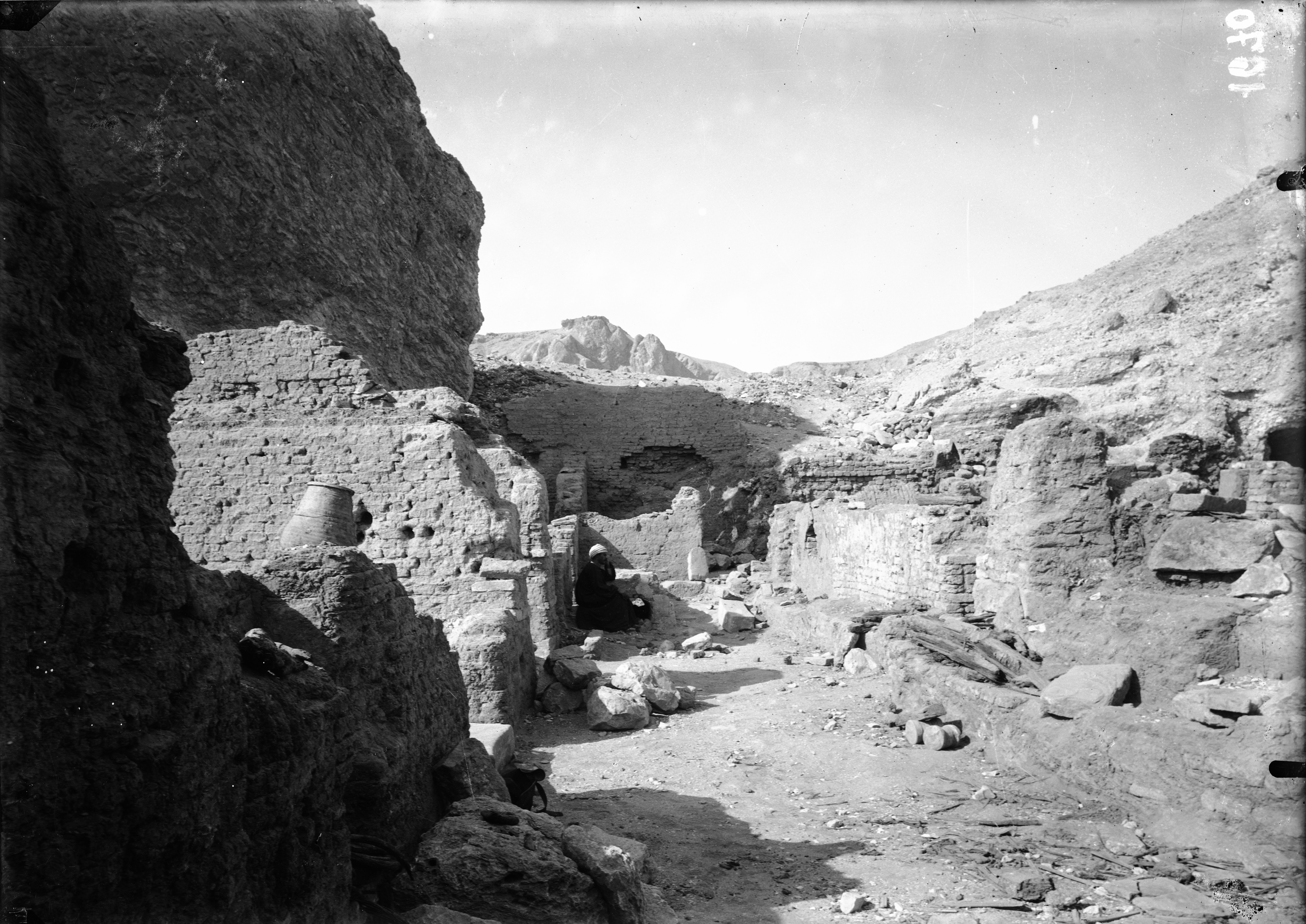

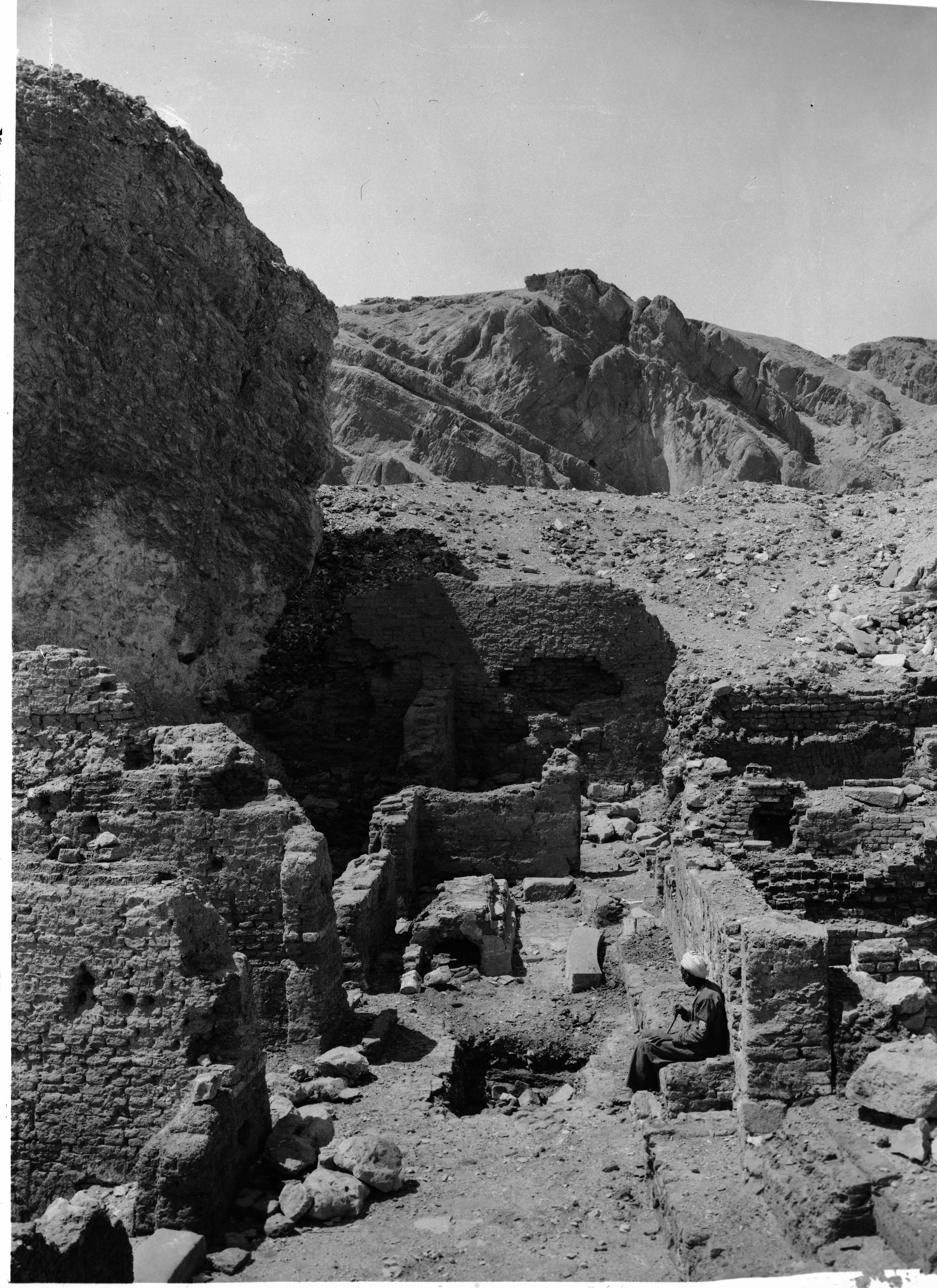

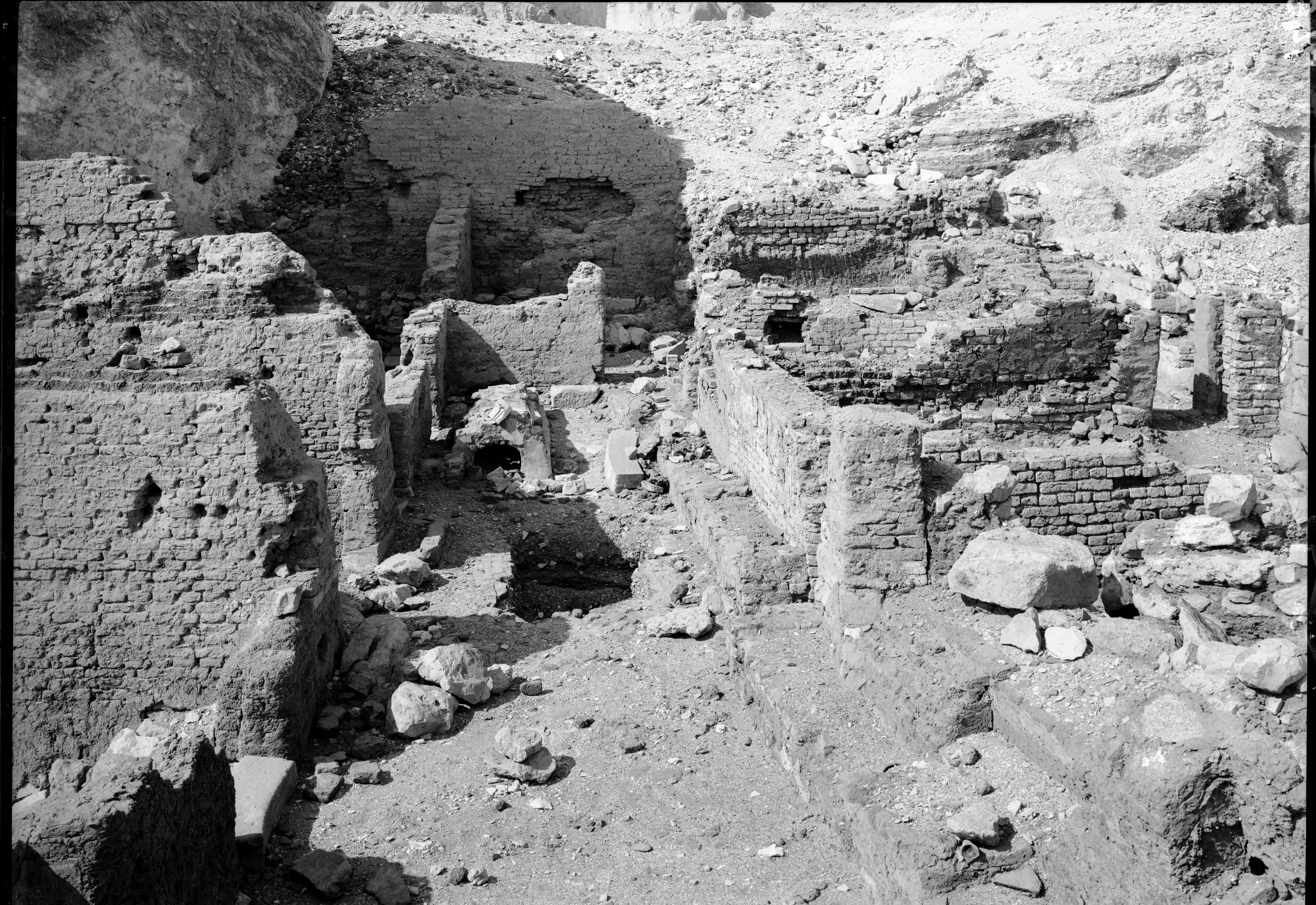

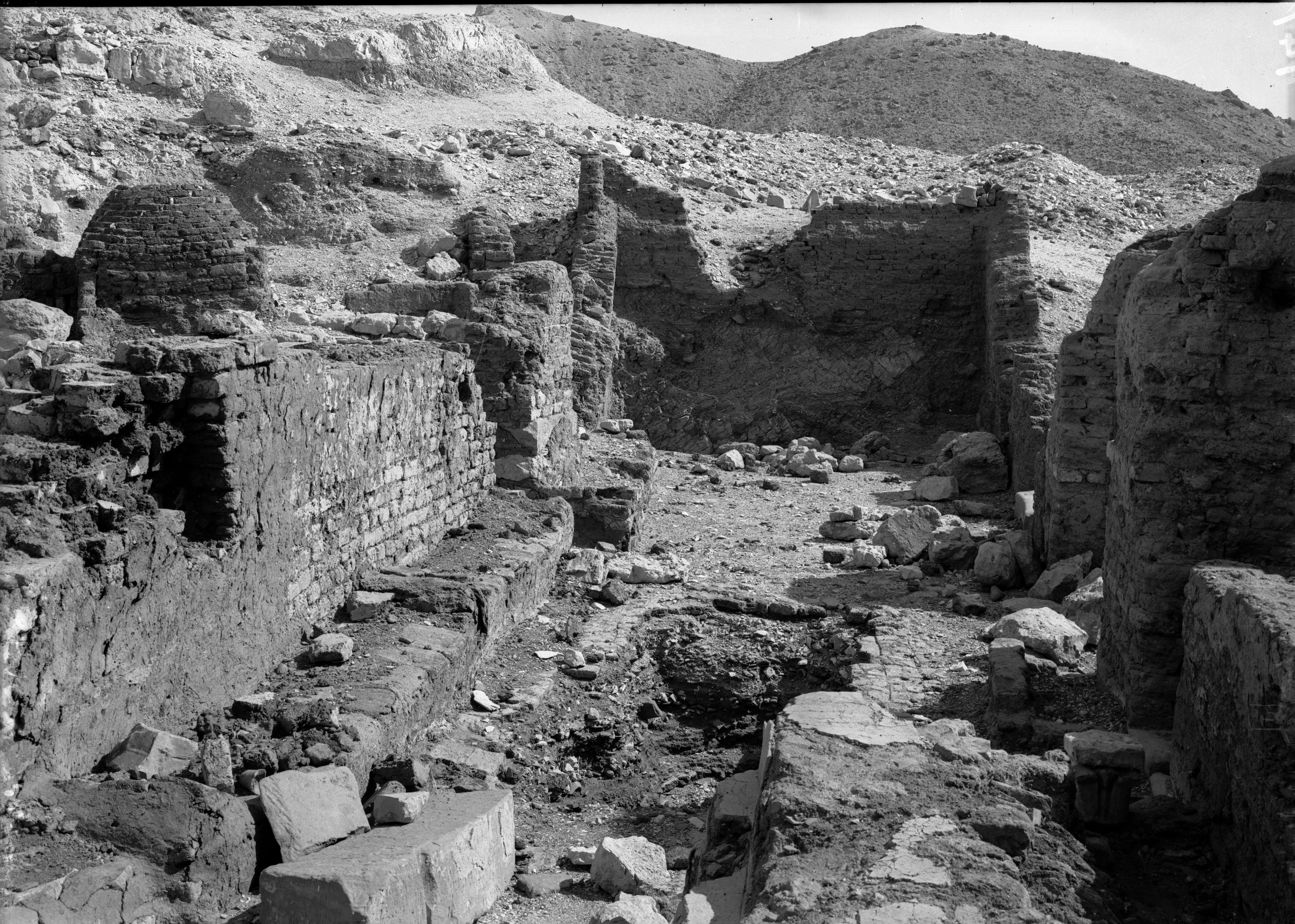

Since the 1980s, Deir el-Roumi has been excavated in greater detail by a French archeological team. Despite erosion, destruction caused by early Christians, and the conversion of the building, a number of Roman-period inscriptions and illustrations have been recovered from walls, stelae, and doors. Study of these remains has made it possible to identify the original patron of the temple and understand its religious role. The French mission also investigated the Christian remains, helping establish the general chronology of the site. Unlike the Roman occupation, the Christian phase yielded a substantial amount of archeological material, including ceramics, tableware, craft equipment, and an oven, all testifying to the activity of the monastery.

The French archeological mission also undertook restoration work on the ruins, which had been damaged by exposure to the elements, especially falling rocks and water runoff from the nearby mountain slopes. The site was notably affected by a severe rainfall event in 1997. The ruins have also suffered from vandalism: during the 2000s, the baptistery basin was destroyed by vandals.

Dozens of ostraca have been discovered at the site, yet they provide little information about monastic life. The most complete collection belonged to an individual named Andreas. These administrative ostraca provide information about him, though he bears no religious title and none of the texts mention the monastery. It has therefore been suggested that Deir el-Roumi may have served as an administrative center. Another possibility is that Andreas brought these documents from his former life when he entered the monastery.

== Bibliography ==
- Bonomi, Joseph (1906). "Topographical Notes on Western Thebes Collected in 1830". Annales du service des antiquités de l'Égypte. Vol. VII. Cairo: Institut Français d'Archéologie Orientale. pp. 78–86.
- Wagner, Guy; Lecuyot, Guy (1994). "Une dédicace d'un néocore, héraut sacré d'Apollon". Bulletin de l'Institut Français d'Archéologie Orientale (in French). 93: 413–418.
- Lecuyot, Guy (1999). "Une nécropole de Thèbes-Ouest à l'époque romaine et copte : la vallée des Reines" (PDF). Kyphi (in French). 2: 33–61.
- Demas, Martha; Agnew, Neville (2012). Valley of the Queens Assessment Report. Vol. I: Conservation and Management Planning. Los Angeles: Getty Conservation Institute.
- Lecuyot, Guy (2016). "Le Deir el-Roumi, le « topos » chrétien". Memnonia (in French). XXVII: 91–97.
- Lecuyot, Guy; Delattre, Alain (2016). "À qui et à quoi servaient les « ermitages » des vallées sud-ouest de la montagne thébaine ?". In Alberto Camplani; Federico Contardi; Paola Buzi (eds.). Coptic Society, Literature and Religion from Late Antiquity to Modern Times (in French). Leuven, Paris & Bristol: Peeters Publishers. pp. 709–718. ISBN 9789042932739.
- Delattre, Alain; Hartenstein, Cassandre; Heilporn, Paul; Lecuyot, Guy (2019). "Une dédicace d'association au Deir el-Roumi" (PDF). Memnonia (in French). XXX: 154–159.
- Müller, Matthias (2020). "Andreas, Son of Petros, and the Monastery of Dayr al-Rūmī: A Usurious Monk? or a Monastic Record Vault?". In Sabine R. Huebner; Eugenio Garosi; Isabelle Marthot-Santaniello; Matthias Müller; Stefanie Schmidt; Matthias Stern (eds.). Living the End of Antiquity: Individual Histories from Byzantine to Islamic Egypt. Berlin & Boston: De Gruyter. pp. 223–236. ISBN 9783110683318.
