= Tanedjemet =

Royal wife in ancient Egypt

Tanodjmy
- King's Wife, King's Daughter
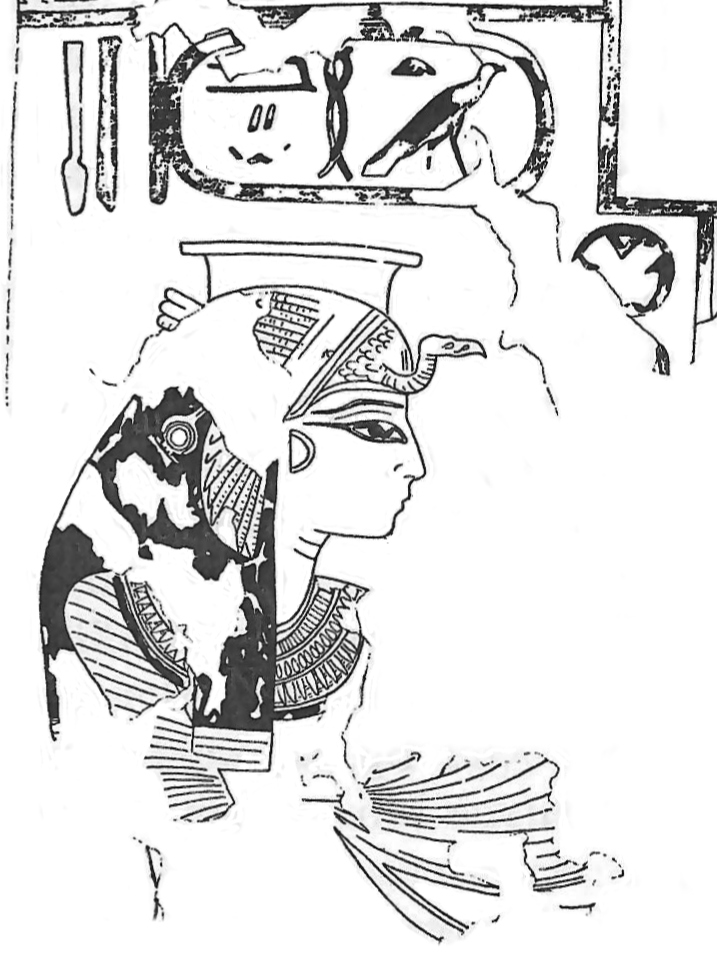
- The queen's portrait from her tomb, QV33.
- Burial: QV 33, Valley of the Queens, Thebes
- Spouse: Probably Seti I
Egyptian name
G1 t M30 Aa15 Z4 Y1 B1
- Dynasty: 19th of Egypt
- Father: Possibly Horemheb
- Religion: Ancient Egyptian religion

Tanedjemet or more accurately Tanedjemy or Tanodjmy (tꜣnḏmy) is a King's Daughter (sꜣt-nsw), King's Wife (ḥmt-nsw), and Mistress of Upper and Lower Egypt (ḥnwt šmʿw tꜣ-mḥw) from the New Kingdom period, only known from her tomb in the Valley of the Queens. While her identity and connections are unstated by any surviving sources, the circumstantial evidence has been interpreted to show that she was almost certainly a wife of Seti I and probably a daughter of Horemheb.

== Evidence and identification ==
Queen Tanodjmy's tomb in the Valley of the Queens was entered and studied by Lepsius in 1844, and documented in his Denkmäler aus Aegypten und Aethiopien. Lepsius misread the queen's name as Tahemy (tꜣḥmy) and did not notice her title of King's Wife, recording her merely as King's Daughter and Mistress of Upper and Lower Egypt. He conjectured that she was a princess from Dynasty 20. This is how she was listed in his book of kings. The reading of the name was corrected by Henri Gauthier seven decades later. The new reading of the name suggested to Robert Hari and Elizabeth Thomas the possibility that this was none other than Mutnodjmet, the wife of Horemheb. This suggestion has been abandoned.

The identification of Tanodjmy as a princess from Dynasty 20 persevered for several decades after Gauthier's publication. The exploration of the Valley of the Queens by a joint mission of the Centre National de la Recherche Scientifique (CNRS) and the Centre d'études et de documentation sur l'ancienne Égypte (CEDAE) under the direction of Christiane Desroches-Noblecourt in the 1970s, however, led to further discoveries, correcting earlier errors and omissions. This included finding the additional title of King's Wife (but not King's Great Wife) and the secure placement of Tanodjmy in Dynasty 19, highlighted in a number of publications, especially by Christian Leblanc.

The new information led to conjectures that Tanodjmy was a daughter-wife of Ramesses II, or a wife of Seti I. On the basis of the circumstantial and comparative evidence provided by the attested and unattested titles of Tanodjmy (King's Daughter and King's Wife but not King's Sister or King's Great Wife), the placement and plan of the royal tombs of the spouses of Seti I and Ramesses II (Type I for the former and Type II for the latter), and the historical evidence, Ian Mladjov agreed with Leblanc in seeing Tanodjmy as a wife of Seti I, buried probably during his reign. Considering the various potential candidates for identification with her royal father in detail, he further concluded the evidence was most compatible with Horemheb as Tanodjmy's father, and that she was not likely to have been a sister or daughter of Seti I. If correct, this identification would provide an unsurprising but hitherto unattested marital connection between the royal families of Dynasties 18 and 19.

Since Tanodjmy's name, titles, conventional representation, and tomb constitute the only concrete evidence for her life, nothing further is known about her biography.

== Tomb QV 33 ==
Inscription from the tomb of Tanodjmy (QV 33) in the Valley of the Queens with the obsolete erroneous reading Tahemy (Lepsius 1900: 236)

Tomb QV 33 in the Valley of the Queens was described by Lepsius, who entered and studied it in 1844. The tomb was also listed as Tomb 14. It is located on the south side of the main wadi of the Valley of the Queens, amid a cluster of tombs of "Type I" commissioned by Seti I. In the inscriptions within the tomb, Queen Tanodjmy is titled King's Daughter, King's Wife, and Mistress of Upper and Lower Egypt. She is depicted with the vulture cap usually associated with queens in this period. The tomb is in poor condition, and not much of the original decoration remains.

The tomb was likely robbed at the end of the 20th Dynasty, and reused during the 26th Dynasty. A large amount of glasswork and other materials dating to this period were found in the tomb. During the Roman Period a large number of mummies was interred in the tomb. These burials are thought to date to the 2nd and 3rd century A.D.

== Bibliography ==
- Demas, Martha, and Neville Agnew, Valley of the Queens Assessment Report Volume 1: Conservation and Management Planning, The Getty Conservation Institute, Los Angeles, 2012. online
- Demas, Martha, and Neville Agnew, Valley of the Queens Assessment Report Volume 2: Assessment of 18th, 19th, and 20th Dynasty Tombs, The Getty Conservation Institute, Los Angeles, 2016. online
- Gauthier, Henri, Livre des rois d'Égypte, vol. 2, Cairo 1912.
- Gauthier, Henri, Livre des rois d'Égypte, vol. 3, Cairo 1914.
- Hari, Robert, Horemheb et la reine Moutnedjemet, ou la fin d'une dynastie, Geneva, 1964.
- Leblanc, Christian, "Le dégagement de la tombe de Ta-nedjemy: Une contribution à l’histoire de la Vallée des Reines (no. 33)," BSFE 89 (1980) 32-49.
- Leblanc, Christian, Nefertari “L’aimée-de-Mout,” Monaco, 1999.
- Lepisus, Carl Richard, Königsbuch der Alten Ägypter vol. 2, Berlin, 1858.
- Lepsius, Carl Richard, Denkmäler aus Aegypten und Aethiopien vol. 3, Leipzig, 1900 (published posthumously).
- Mladjov, Ian, "Rediscovering Queen Tanodjmy: A probable link between Dynasties 18 and 19," Göttinger Miszellen 242 (2014) 57-70. online
- Porter, Bertha, and Rosalind Moss, Topographical Bibliography of Ancient Egyptian Hieroglyphic Texts, Statues, Reliefs and Paintings Volume I: The Theban Necropolis, Part 2: Royal Tombs and Smaller Cemeteries, Griffith Institute, 1964.
- Thomas, Elizabeth, "Was Queen Mutnedjemet the owner of Tomb 33 in the Valley of the Queens?" Journal of Egyptian Archaeology 53 (1967) 161-163.
- Troy, Lana, Patterns of Queenship in Ancient Egyptian Myth and History, Uppsala, 1986.
