= Cliff tomb of Hatshepsut =

Tomb in the Valley of the Queens, Egypt

- Burial site of Hatshepsut (unused)
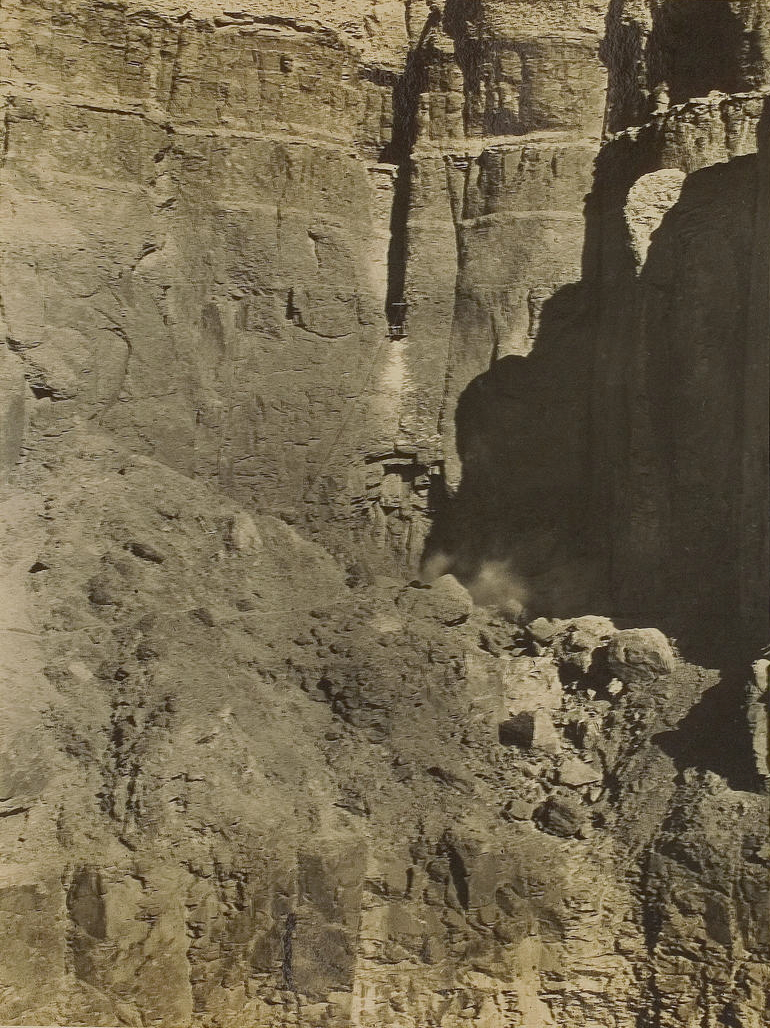
- Location of the tomb, in the slot in the cliff, in a photograph taken by Harry Burton

- Coordinates: 25°43′54.5″N 32°35′00.8″E
- Location: Wady Sikkat Taqet Zaid, Western Wadis
- Discovered: October 1916
- Excavated by: Howard Carter
- Decoration: Undecorated
- Layout: Bent to the right

The cliff tomb of Hatshepsut, also known as tomb Wadi A-1, is the tomb quarried for her as the Great Royal Wife of Thutmose II, a pharaoh of the Eighteenth Dynasty. It is located in Wady Sikkat Taqet Zaid, to the west of the Valley of the Kings near Luxor, Egypt. The tomb is cut into a slot in the vertical cliff face 70 metres (230 ft) above the valley floor. It is unfinished, with the cutting of the burial chamber never being completed. Although never used for a burial, it did contain a sarcophagus inscribed for Hatshepsut as Great Royal Wife. Originally found by local diggers, the tomb was later excavated by Howard Carter on behalf of the Earl of Carnarvon in 1916.

== Location, discovery, and excavation ==
The tomb is in what Egyptologist Howard Carter called a "remote and unfrequented" part of the Theban Necropolis, in Wady Sikkat Taqet Zaid, a branch of Wady Gabbanat el-Qurud, on the western side of the mountains from the Valley of the Kings. This area, sometimes called the Western Wadis, 2 km (1.2 mi) from the Valley of the Queens, likely served as a burial ground for queens during the early Eighteenth Dynasty. The tomb is cut into a water-worn cleft in the rock at the head of the wady, 70 metres (230 ft) above the valley floor.

The tomb was discovered by locals in October 1916. With World War I underway, reduced numbers of antiquities officials, combined with the economic depression of the war, led to a rise in tomb robbery in the Theban area. Howard Carter recounts that the discovery of the tomb was made by a local group, who, once word of the find spread, were driven off the claim by a rival gang. Carter, on holiday in Luxor, was approached by local leaders and asked to resolve the situation. When Carter and his workmen arrived at the tomb, they found the robbers still at work:

It was midnight when we arrived on the scene, and the guide pointed out to me the end of a rope, which dangled sheer down the face of a cliff. Listening, we could hear the robbers actually at work, so first I severed their rope, thereby cutting off their means of escape, and then, making secure a good stout rope of my own, I lowered myself down the cliff... There were eight at work... I gave the alternative of clearing out by means of my rope or else staying where they were without any rope at all, and eventually they saw reason and departed.

The tomb was entirely filled with water-washed debris, through which the locals had tunneled for a distance of 29 metres (95 ft); the hole was only wide enough to admit a single person, crawling on their stomach.

Carter's clearance of the tomb took twenty days, with workmen working relay shifts day and night. Access to the tomb was improved with a timber structure and a projecting stage which allowed an easier ascent from the floor of the valley.

== Layout and contents ==
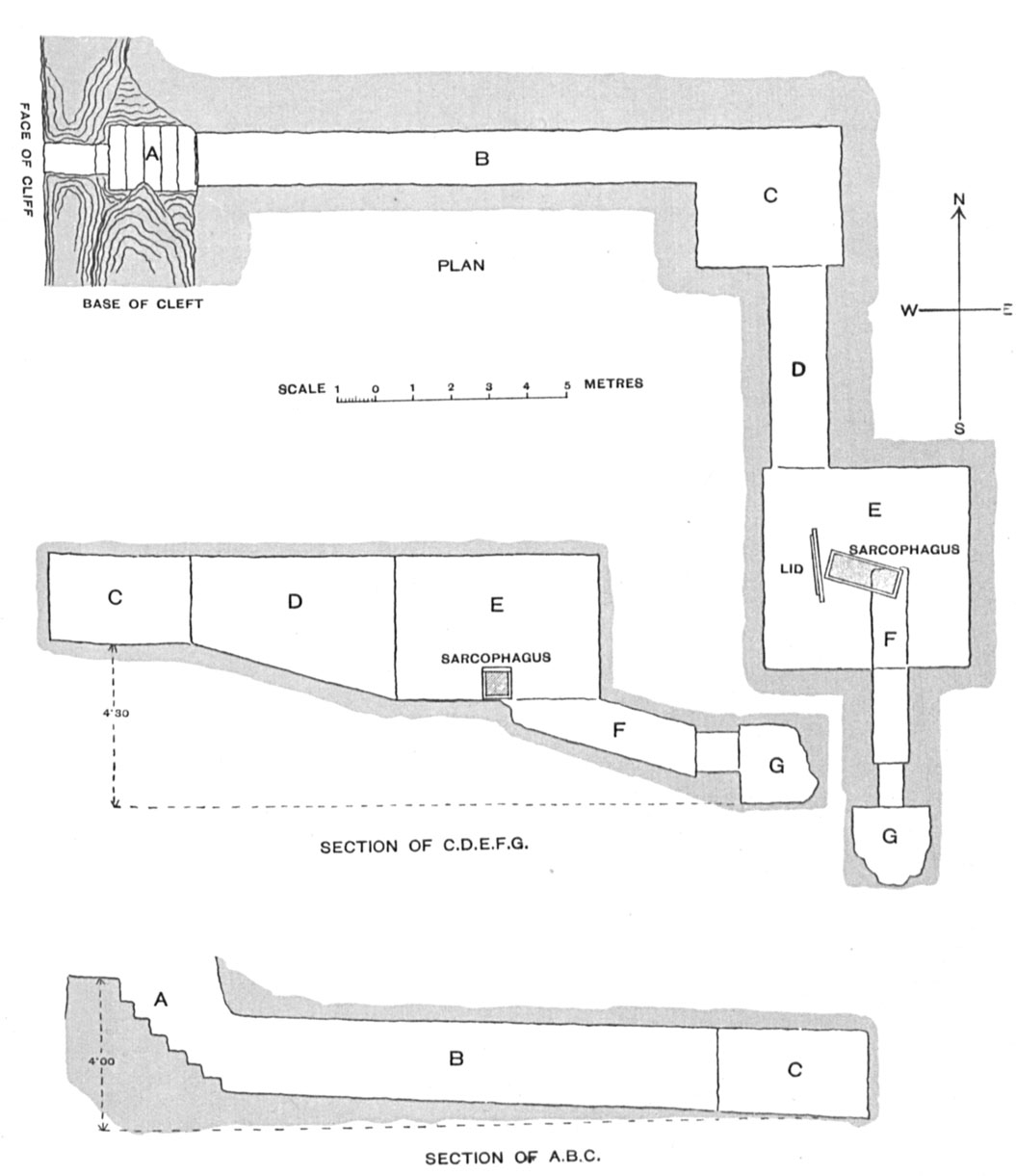
Floor plan and section of the tomb prepared for Queen Hatshepsut

The tomb has a simple layout, consisting of an entrance stair leading to a descending passageway 17 metres (56 ft) long which opens to the right into a square antechamber. A further steeper corridor leads from the antechamber to another square room, the sepulchral hall. In the centre of the floor of this hall is cut a steep passage which leads to an unfinished room, presumably intended to be the burial chamber.

The floor of the sepulchral hall was covered in limestone slabs which Carter suggests were intended to form a plinth for the sarcophagus, or were intended to seal the tomb. He noted that similarity between these slabs and those found in KV20 and KV38, where they were decorated with scenes from the Amduat. The only significant item found in the tomb was the 2.99 metres (9.8 ft) long yellow quartzite sarcophagus intended for the queen which was located in the final chamber. It is inscribed with texts naming Hatshepsut as Great Royal Wife, among other titles, indicating that it predated her rise to regent and pharaoh. The rectangular lid of the sarcophagus is carved with a long cartouche containing a figure of Nut facing left and raising her arms to embrace the deceased; it had been broken into two pieces.
