= Sethos =

Sethos is the name used in ancient Greek historiography for several Egyptian pharaohs:

- Seti I (1290–1279 BC), 19th dynasty
- Seti II (1200/1199–1194/1193), 19th dynasty
- Shebitku (714–705 BC), 25th dynasty

It may also refer to either of two temples of Sethos:

- Mortuary Temple of Seti I at Qurna
- Memorial Temple of Seti I at Abydos, Egypt

It may also refer to:

- Life of Sethos, an 18th-century French novel based on Herodotus' account of Shebitku
- 5009 Sethos, a minor planet in the asteroid belt
- Pinguicula × 'Sethos', a cultivar of hybrid carnivorous plant
- Sethos (Amelia Peabody), a character in the Amelia Peabody series of novels by Elizabeth Peters
- Sethos, a character in 2020 video game Genshin Impact
