= QV38 =

Unfinished ancient Egyptian tomb in the Valley of the Queens

Theban tomb QV38
- Burial site of Sitre
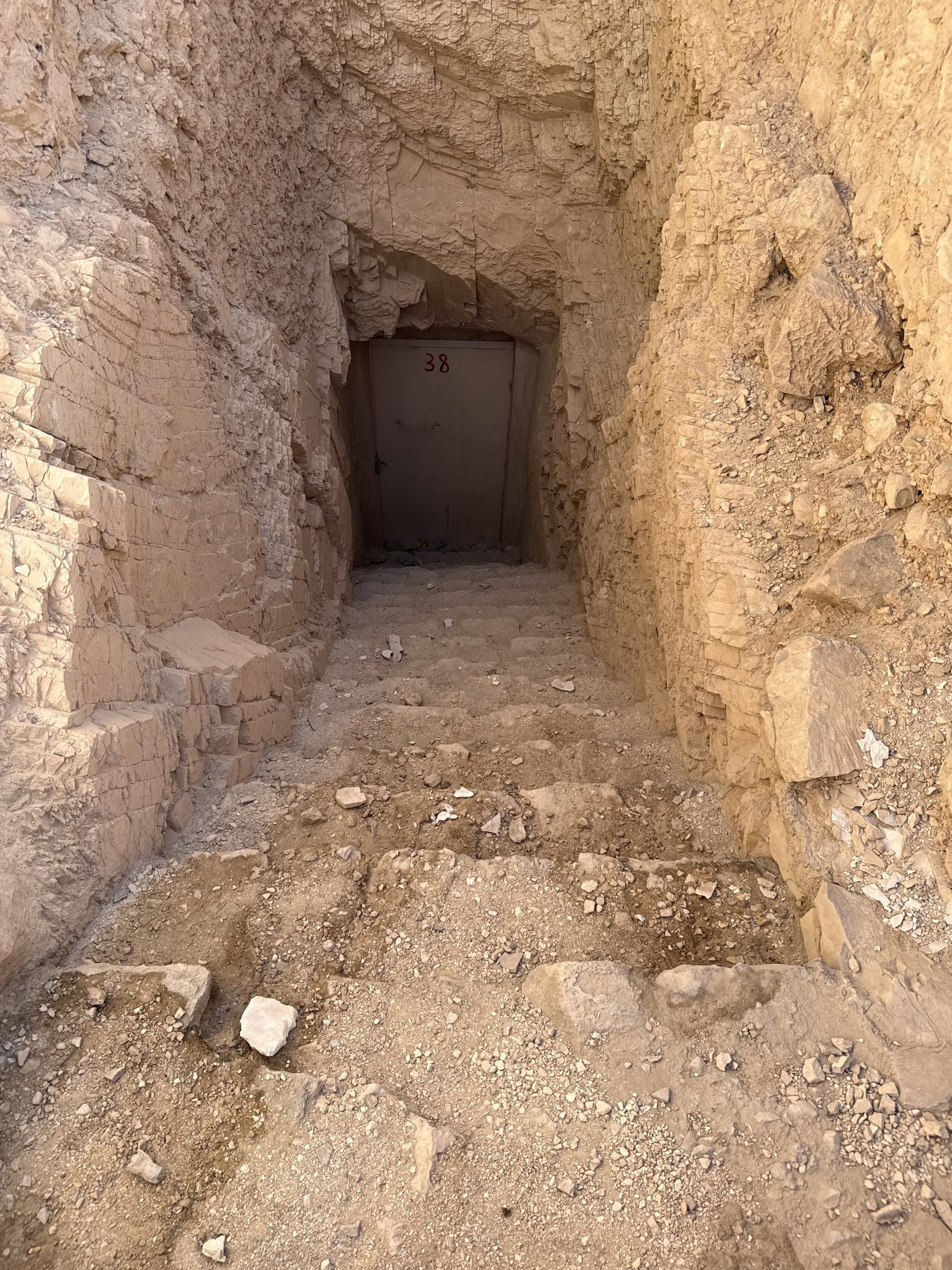
- Entrance to the tomb

- Location within Egypt
- Location: Valley of the Queens, Theban Necropolis
- Discovered: 1828
- Excavated by: Ernesto Schiaparelli, 1903
- ← Previous; QV37 Next → QV39

The tomb of Sitre, also known by the designation QV38 (Queen Valley 38), is a tomb in the Valley of the Queens, in the Theban Necropolis, on the western bank of the Nile, opposite Luxor, in Egypt, and was intended for Sitre, wife of Ramesses I and mother of Seti I.

The tomb remained unfinished and preserves plastered walls with figures only roughly sketched; in 1903 it was cleared of debris and studied by the Italian mission of the Egyptian Museum of Turin, directed by Ernesto Schiaparelli.

== Owner ==
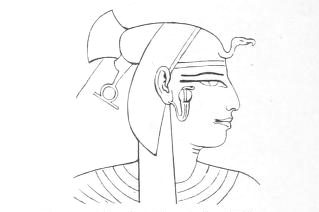
Drawing of Queen Sitre from the decoration of her tomb, made by Flinders Petrie.

Sitre, whose name also appears in the form Satra, was a queen of the Nineteenth Dynasty of Egypt, wife of Ramesses I and mother of Seti I; in QV38 she is named with the titles "king's wife", "god's wife", "lady of the Two Lands" and "great mother of the king", while in KV17, the tomb of Seti I, she is given the titles "hereditary princess", "Great Royal Wife" and "lady of the Two Lands"; in the temple of Seti I at Abydos, moreover, a cult statue of Sitre, represented together with those of Seti I and Ramesses I, bears the title "king's wife".

== History ==
The tomb of Sitre was probably the first tomb of a queen built in the Valley of the Queens and may have been begun on the initiative of Ramesses I, while the decoration was carried out during the reign of his son Seti I, to whom much of the construction also belongs; in the tomb Sitre is called "mother of the king". Schiaparelli described the burial place as an unfinished tomb, with the staircase and the first two chambers excavated, the walls covered with plaster, and the figures and inscriptions first drawn in red and then corrected in black; the work was interrupted and the tomb was probably abandoned. The tomb remained unfinished: the last room is only roughly cut, while the walls of the burial chamber were plastered and the figures remained simple sketches.

=== Excavation ===
Before the Italian excavations, the tomb had already been described by John Gardner Wilkinson in 1828, as tomb 19, by Jean-François Champollion in 1828-1829, by Karl Richard Lepsius in 1844-1845, as tomb 13, and by Heinrich Karl Brugsch in 1854; in 1903 the burial place was then fully cleared and studied by an Italian mission of the Egyptian Museum of Turin directed by Ernesto Schiaparelli. In the report of the Italian Archaeological Mission in Egypt, Schiaparelli included the "unfinished tomb of Queen Satra" among the other tombs of the Nineteenth Dynasty of Egypt in the Valley of the Queens; of the tombs listed there, only two had been discovered by the Italian mission, while the others, including that of Satra, were already partly known, and were cleared of the debris that filled them, making the scenes and inscriptions visible in their entirety. The American mission led by Elizabeth Thomas documented the tomb in 1959-1960 and, between 1988 and 1991, in 2006-2008 and in 2008, further documentation and conservation work was carried out by the CNRS, the Supreme Council of Antiquities and the Getty Conservation Institute.

== Description ==
The tomb consists of a descending stairway, a passage leading to a chamber, a second passage and a deeper chamber; in the first chamber there are four niches, one high on each wall, intended to hold amulets.

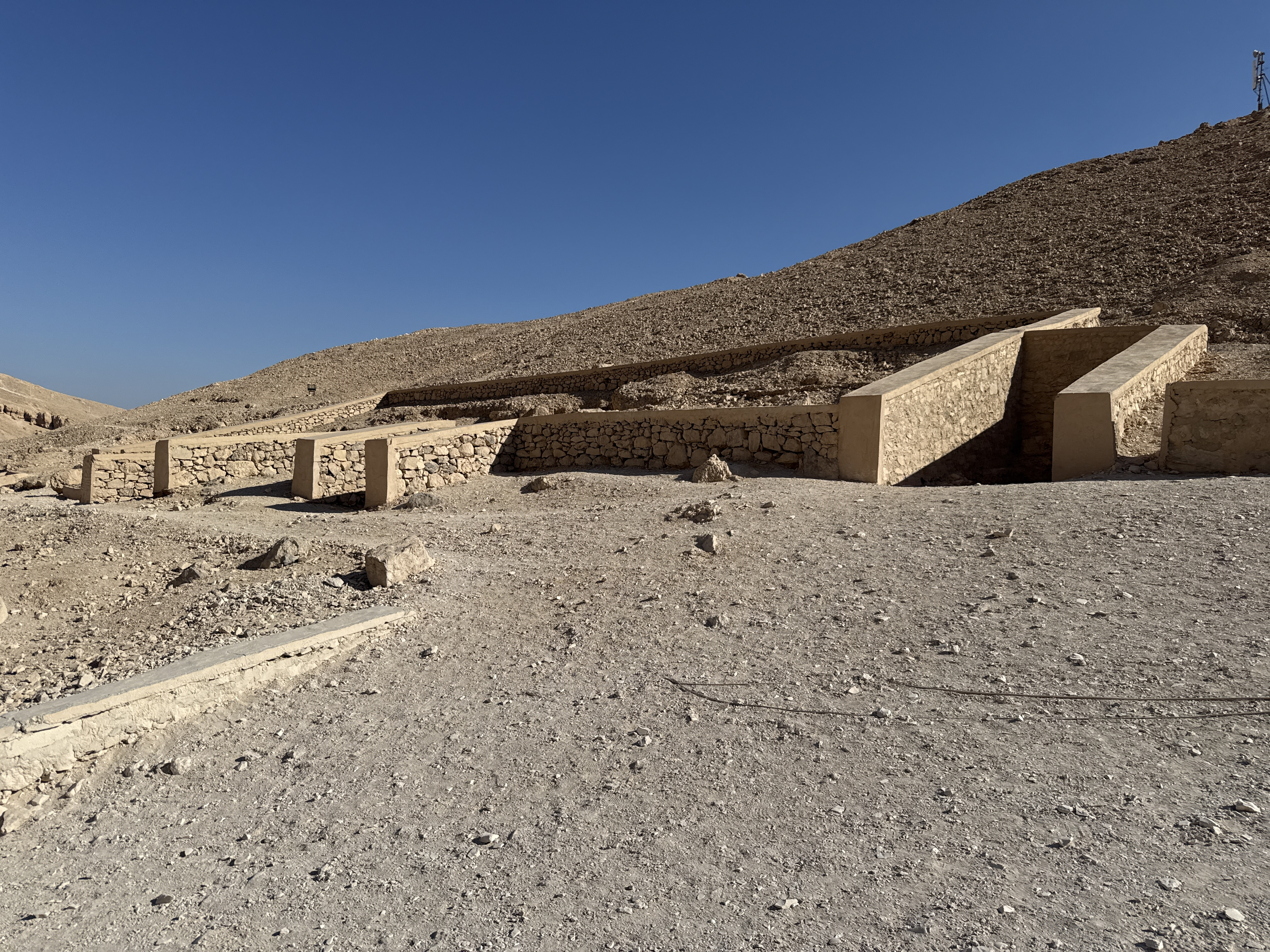
Exterior of the tomb

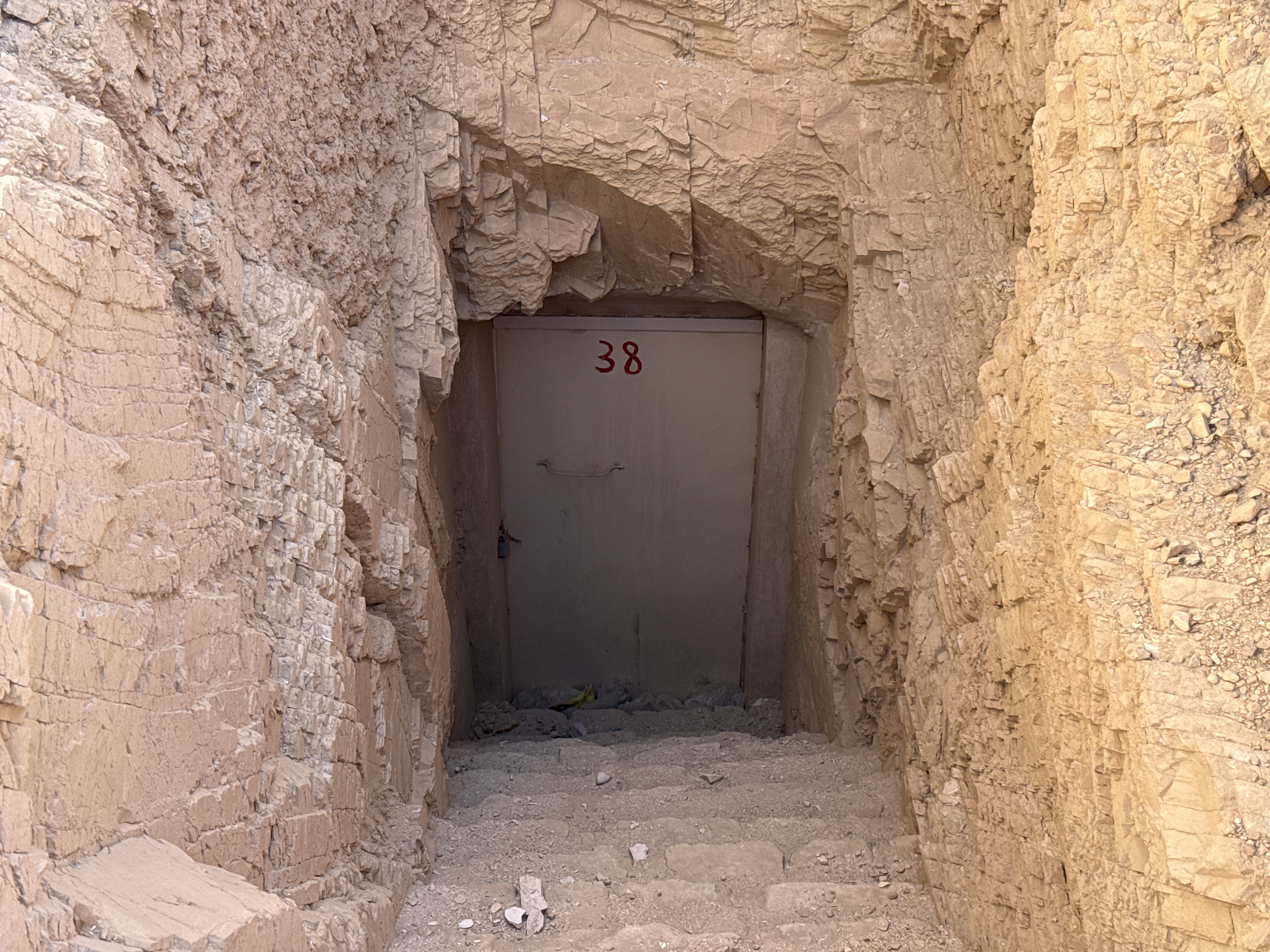
Entrance to the tomb

=== Decoration ===
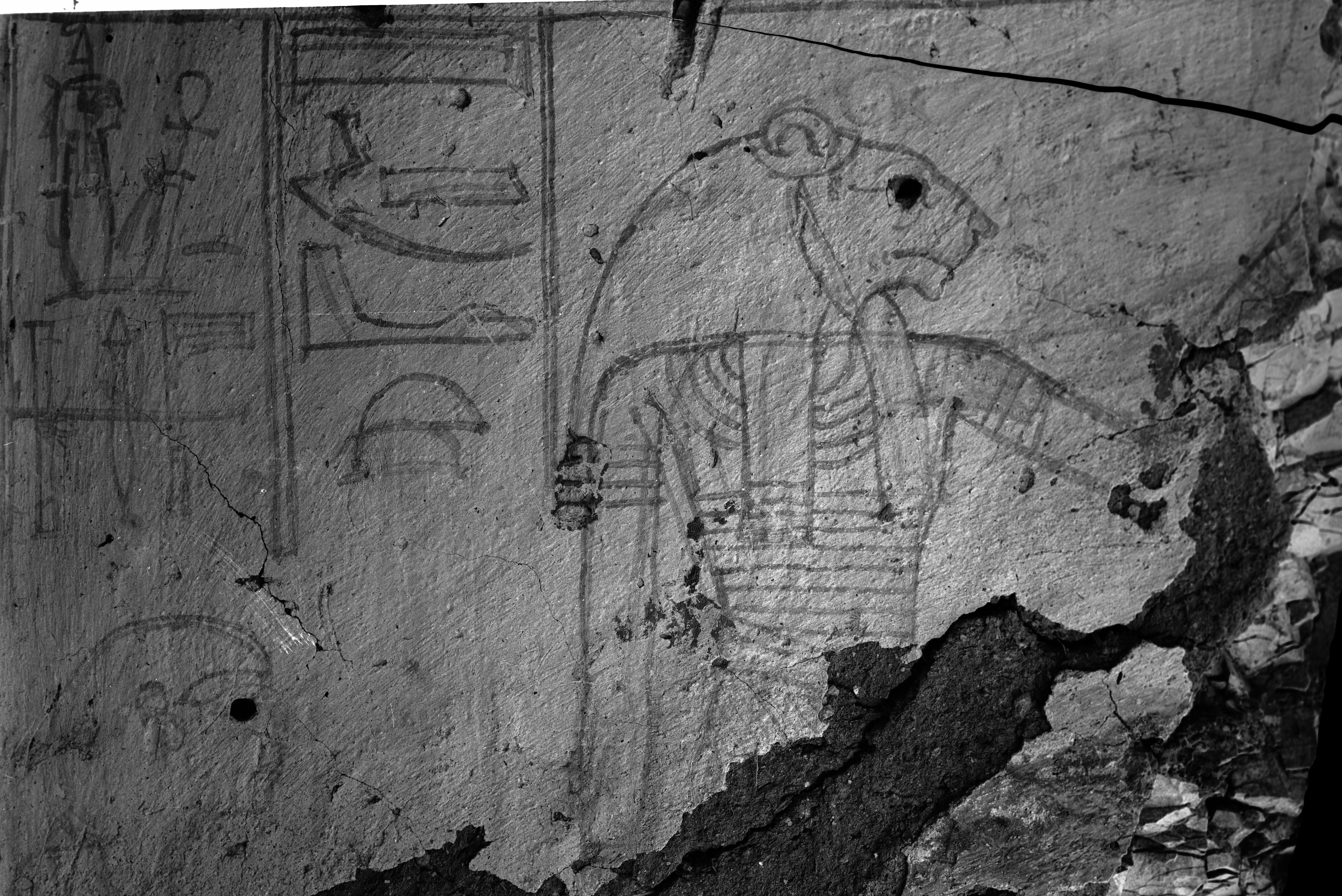
Unfinished decoration in QV38, the tomb of Sitre, photograph from 1903-1905

The main chamber shows processions of deities on the right and left walls, all facing the entrance of the tomb; on the east wall are recognizable Imsety, Duamutef, Anubis, Maat, Ir-renef-djesef, Nephthys, Serket, a monkey and two baboons within a kiosk, and Queen Sitre is also seated before a naos, a small shrine intended to house a statue or sacred image; another scene shows a lion-headed god followed by Maat. On the west wall are represented a kiosk with a cat-headed god and Anubis, Hapi, Qebehsenuef, Horus-Irbakef, Thoth, Isis, Neith and Horus, and another kiosk with Mut in the form of a vulture, a bird-headed god and a front-facing god; on the north wall there are two boats with three gods below, while Nut is represented on the ceiling, in a decorative solution introduced in the Nineteenth Dynasty of Egypt.

== See also ==
- Ernesto Schiaparelli
- Museo Egizio
- Ramesses I
- Seti I
- Sitre
- Theban Necropolis
- Valley of the Queens
