= Peter J. Brand =

Canadian Egyptologist

- Born: April 5, 1967 (age 59); Toronto, Ontario, Canada
- Citizenship: Canada; United States

Academic background
- Education: University of Toronto (PhD); University of Memphis; University of Texas at Arlington
- Thesis: The Monuments of Seti I: Epigraphic, Historical and Art Historical Analysis (1998)

Academic work
- Discipline: Egyptology
- Institutions: University of Toronto; University of Memphis

Peter James Brand (born 5 April 1967) is a Canadian American Egyptologist. Currently an associate professor of history at the University of Memphis in Tennessee, USA, he previously taught at the University of Toronto. His primary scholarly interest is in the art history of the Ramesside Period of Ancient Egypt. He has been the Field co-director of the Karnak Great Hypostyle Hall Project of the University of Memphis since 2001, along with Dr. Jean Revez, professor at the Université du Québec à Montréal.

== Education ==
He completed his PhD in 1998 at the University of Toronto with his dissertation The Monuments of Seti I: Epigraphic, Historical and Art Historical Analysis. This was later published by Brill in 2000 and is considered to be one of the most comprehensive studies on the reign of Seti I who is often eclipsed in history by the glorious 66-year reign of his son, Ramesses II. A book reviewer called it "the first comprehensive study of the reign (of Seti I) ever published." (see p. 114)" It contains a catalogue of most of Seti I's monuments and an important discussion of the historical significance and reigns of Ramesses I and Seti I. Brand also attended the University of Texas at Arlington and the University of Memphis prior to the University of Toronto.

== Works ==
In 2009, Peter J. Brand published a paper in the University of Memphis serial titled "Causing His Name to Live: Studies in Egyptian Epigraphy and History in Memory of William J. Murnane". It was called: "Usurped Cartouches of Merenptah at Karnak and Luxor" Finally, in 2018, Brand with the late William J. Murnane and Rosa Feleg published a major publication on "The Great Hypostyle Hall in the Temple of Karnak."
