= Temple of Seti I =

The Temple of Seti I may refer to the

- Mortuary Temple of Seti I in the Theban Necropolis near Luxor, Egypt
- Temple of Seti I in Abydos, Egypt

== See also ==
- KV17, the tomb of Seti I in the Valley of the Kings
