= Sitre =

- Great Royal Wife
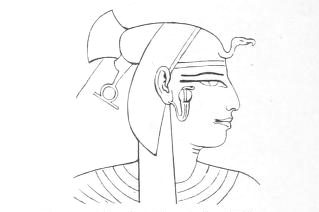
- Drawing of Sitre, from her Theban tomb QV38.
- Burial: QV38, Valley of the Queens
- Spouse: Ramesses I
- Issue: Seti I
- Dynasty: 19th Dynasty

ra G39 t
Sitre
in hieroglyphs
Era: New Kingdom
(1550–1069 BC)

Sitre (zꜣt-rꜥ, "Daughter of Re") or Tia-Sitre, was the Great Royal Wife of Pharaoh Ramesses I of Egypt and mother of Seti I.

== Biography ==
There is some debate around the identity of Ramesses' wife and Seti's mother. Sitre is shown together with Ramesses I and Seti in Seti's Abydos temple where she is called the King's Mother. She is called the King's Great Wife both in Seti's temple and in Seti's tomb (where one would expect her to be mentioned as King's Mother). However, Sitre's tomb, which can stylistically be dated to this period, mentions its owner as a King's Mother.

The Year 400 Stela, found in Tanis and dated to the reign of Sitre's grandson Ramesses II describes Seti as the son of Paramessu (the name of Ramesses I before he became pharaoh) and Tia. Also, Seti's daughter was named Tia. It can be assumed that Tia and Sitre are the same person and that she altered her name when her husband became pharaoh, just like he changed his name from Paramessu to Ramesses. The fact that one of the daughters of Ramesses II was named Tia-Sitre makes it even more likely.

The absence of the title King's Daughter for her indicates that Sitre was of non-royal descent. She did hold a large number of titles. She was a Hereditary Princess (iryt-p`t), a Great King’s Mother (mwt-niswt-wrt), also described as a God’s Mother (mwt-ntr). Her queenly titles included Lady of The Two Lands (nbt-t3wy), King’s Wife (hmt-nisw), Great King’s Wife, his beloved (hmt-niswt-wrt meryt.f) and Mistress of Upper and Lower Egypt (hnwt-Shm’w-mhw). She also held the title of God’s Wife (hmt-ntr).

== Tomb QV38 ==
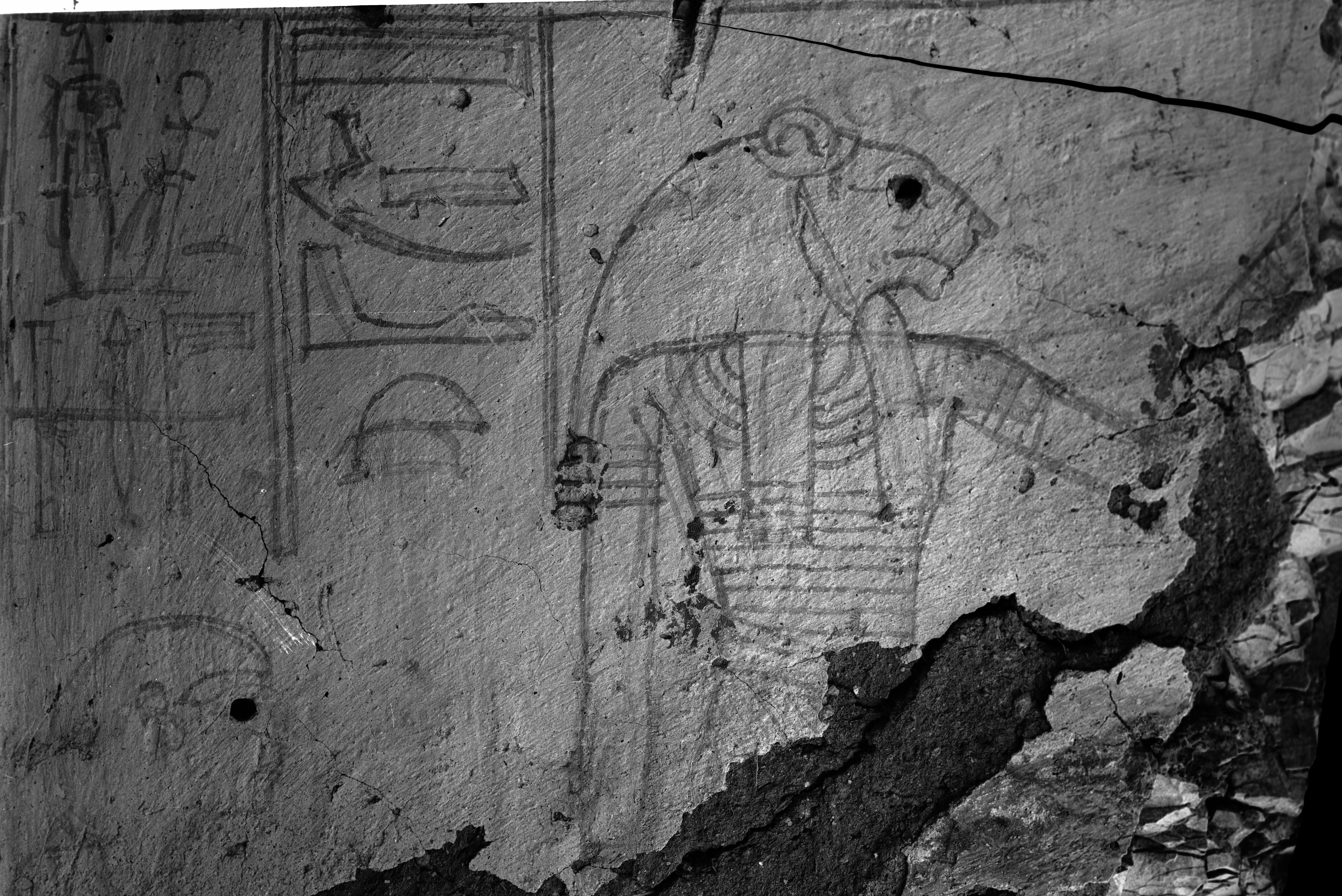
Unfinished decoration for the QV38 tomb of Sitre, 1903–1905 photograph

She was buried in a tomb in the Valley of the Queens QV38. The tomb was already described by Karl Richard Lepsius (tomb 13) and John Gardner Wilkinson (tomb 19) The tomb may have been commissioned by her son Seti I. This would be the reason she is called a King's mother in her tomb. The decoration was unfinished, consisting of just line drawings.

In Porter and Moss a description is given of the scenes outlined in the tomb. The decorations include images of Imsety, Duamutef, Anubis, Maat, Ir-renef-djesef, Nephthys, Serket, a monkey and two baboons in kiosk. Queen Sitre is further shown seated before a naos. Another scene shows a Lion-headed god, followed by Maat. Further scenes include a kiosk containing a cat-headed god and Anubis, Hapi, Qebehsenuef, Horus-Irbakef, Thoth, Isis, Neith, Horus, and a kiosk containing Mut as vulture, a bird-headed god, and full-face god. Two boats are shown, with three gods below.
