= Baketwernel (19th dynasty) =

Baketwerel
- Royal Wife; Queen consort of Egypt
- Spouse: Seti I (?)
- Dynasty: 19th Dynasty

G29 k t w r n Z2 r Z1
Baketwernel
in hieroglyphs
Era: New Kingdom
(1550–1069 BC)

Baketwernel was an ancient Egyptian queen during the 19th Dynasty. She is believed to have been the wife of Seti I and was possibly buried in the Valley of the Queens.

== Life ==
Baketwernel appears in Papyrus Mayer A from the reign of Ramesses XI. The document records her as "King’s Wife Baketwernel of King Menmaatre." Although the reigning pharaoh, Ramesses XI, also bore the throne name Menmaatre (Menmaatre-Setepenptah), in official ancient Egyptian documents, the mention of a king’s name—apart in a dateline—typically implies that the king in question was already deceased. Elsewhere in the papyrus, Ramesses XI is referred to as "lord," and the opening text of the document clearly establishes that Menmaatre refers specifically to Seti I.

She was possibly buried in the Valley of the Queens. Her tomb was looted during the reign of Ramesses XI in the Twentieth Dynasty, and there are currently no further records concerning her.
