= Mortuary Temple of Seti I =

13th century BC building in Luxor, Egypt

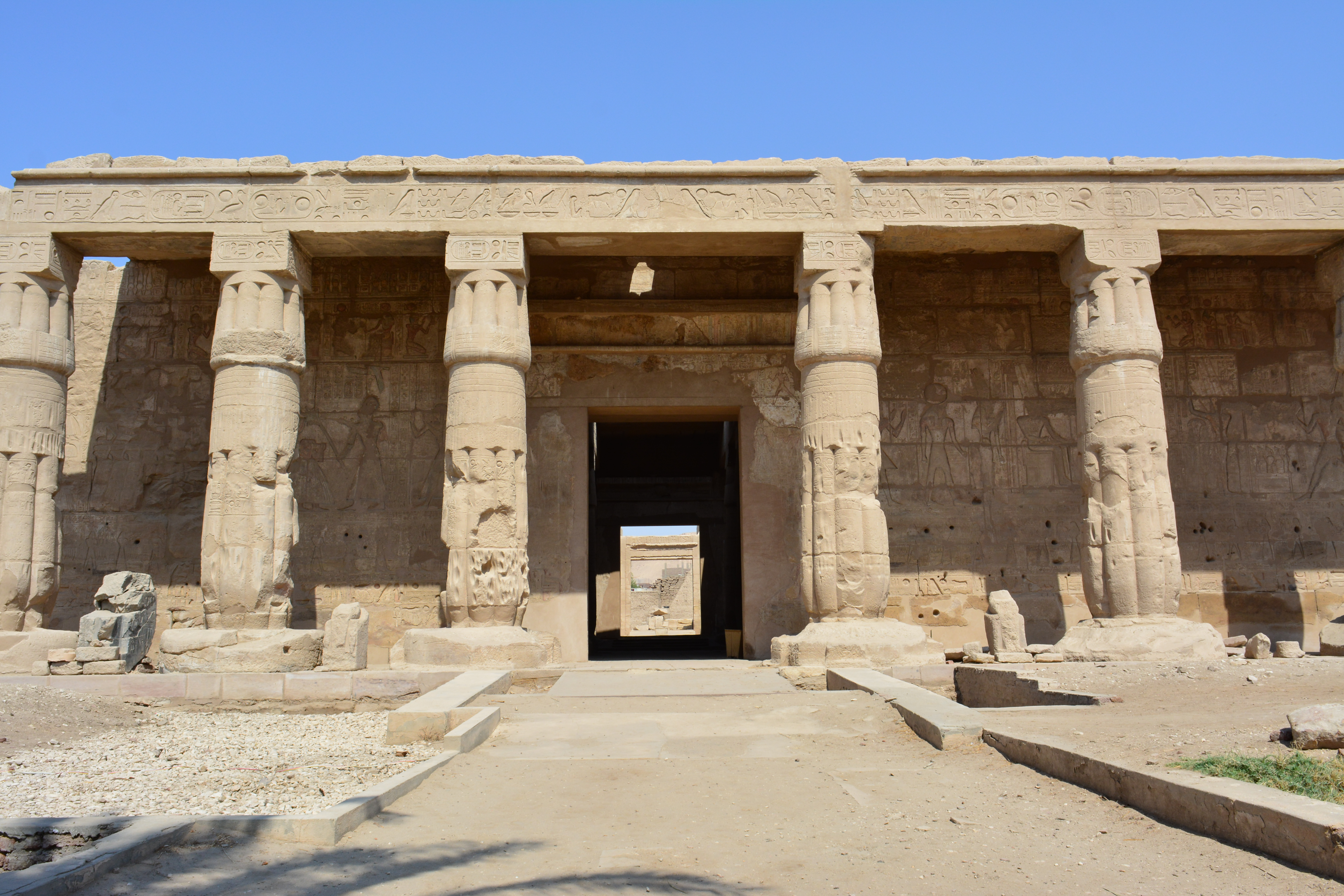
- View of remaining buildings in the Mortuary Temple of Seti I

- Location within Egypt
- 25°43′58″N 32°37′41″E
- Type: Mortuary temple
- Location: Upper Egypt

The Mortuary Temple of Seti I is the memorial temple (or mortuary temple) of the New Kingdom Pharaoh Seti I. It is located in the Theban Necropolis in Upper Egypt, across the River Nile from the modern city of Luxor (Thebes). The edifice is situated near the town of Qurna.

Location

The temple of Seti I was built along the processional route for the Beautiful Festival of the Valley that was held annually. After crossing the east bank of the Nile from Kanak temple with the Braque housing the statue of Amun-Re, Seti’s mortuary temple was the first stop of the processional event. The location of Seti's temple during the early Middle Kingdom, was associated with the cult of Hathor where she received the dead in the west. The area of the necropolis had by this time the mortuary temple of Hatshepsut and Mentuhotep II where the focus of the Beautiful Festival of the Valley centered around Hatshepsut's temple.

== Construction ==
The temple seems to have been constructed toward the end of the reign of Seti and may have been completed by his son Ramesses II after his death. One of the chambers contains a shrine dedicated to Seti's father Ramesses I, who reigned a little under two years, and did not construct a mortuary temple for himself.

The Mortuary Temple of Seti I follows a traditional linear, axial architectural layout typical of New Kingdom memorial complexes. However, the temple complex was enclosed by a high mud-brick wall 3.15 meters thick that incorporated towers or bastions 5 by 5 ms in mass on all four corners of the wall giving an impression of a fortified complex, while the walls had buttress-like structures approximately 17, 30 meters apart. Seti reintroduced the mud-brick wall structure that had not been seen in prior mortuary temple complexes of the 18th dynasty.The temple was subdivided into tri-partite sections typical of a New Kingdom temple layout. Initially one enters through a pylon, a twin tower gateway not seen prior to the 18th dynasty that represented the (akhet), the horizon in which the sun rose and set between two mountain peaks. In a temple complex, the pylon gate separated the chaotic secular world from the pure divine n gateway was called, (Bekhlet) based on 18th dynasty interpretation meaning, "to be vigilant". The first area after the pylon was an open forecourt or peristyle court was flanked by rows of columns supporting a covered porticos along the perimeter. This court served as transition from the secular world to the world of the gods. It was only accessed to limited public individuals and lesser officials during festivals. Within the first court in the south corner, Seti built a royal palace that became the prototype for all palace design from then on. The palace was design as a ritual temple palace for the dead king.The second court was a festival court that was to have a peristyle portico built, however, only a column portico faces the temple facade. A hypostyle hall follows after the column portico. This area of the temple light penetration is at a minimal only shining through the hypostyle clerestory windows. The Hypostyle Hall contains six side chapels that the king is admitted into the world of the gods. Chapel one and six, are transitory areas to access suites to the south and north of the hypostyle hall. In chapel two is where purification takes place to enter the space of the gods. In chapel four, Seti is associates with Osiris. In chapel five two priest pour water of life over the standing embracing statues of Seti and Amun. This ritual act transforms Seti into the god Seti-Amun, where he becomes divine. At the far west wall, a false door was placed so the spirit of the ruler can pass from his tomb to the temple. Within the large west room, two chapels alongside the false door, there were a statue of Re and Monthu representing Heliopolis of the north and south.Due to the early death of Ramesses I, Seti built a mortuary shrine adjacent to the west side of the hypostyle hall. On the north side of the hypostyle hall, a solar court depicts Ramesse II making an offering to the sun god Ra-Horakhty. It is believed that the temple was constructed during Ramesses' first jubilee, thirty years on the throne.

Completion Seti, I initiated the construction of his mortuary temple late in his reign. He began building in year sixth of an even year reign. Brand, pages 232-233. Due to Seti’s early demise, he did not finish the inscriptions and decorations. Seti constructed the sanctuaries halls, cult chambers, a temple palace, the first pylon, magazines, and the enclosure wall. Brand page 234. After Seti’s death, Ramesses II ascended the throne and continued work on the temple for approximately two years abandoning the work after taking his long form of his prenomen, Usermaattre-Setepere meaning “Powerful is the justice of Re, chosen of Re.” Shortly after year twenty, when he adopted the nomen, R’- ms-sw, Ramessu, Ramesses II continued again to complete reliefs in the sun court, exterior walls, and unfinished sections of the temple. Brand, page, 245.

The type of reliefs and quality of the inscriptions determines which pharaoh was responsible for its creation. Earlier incised reliefs are created exclusively in the raised relief form, which are credited to Seti I, as well as the pharaoh portrayed inclined at the torso while standing and kneeling in the presence of the gods. Brand, page 246. To identify works by Ramesses II, reliefs are found in the raised and sunken style, are in the areas of the vestibule to the Ramesses I suite. In the hypostyle hall, Seti’s reliefs are found only on the north wall of the hall. On the south wall both Seti and Ramesses are evenly intermixed, while on the east wall, Ramesses’ name appears exclusive of Seti’s. In the transverse hall, Ramesses overshadows Seti on the east wall, while the west wall both names are evenly mixed. Brand, page 246.

Current condition

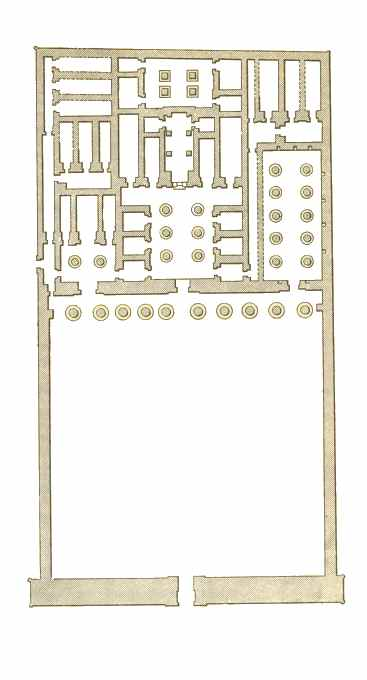
Floor plan of the temple

The entire court and any pylons associated with the site are now in ruins, and much of the eastern part of the complex is buried under the modern town of Qurna.

== Bibliography ==
1. Schulz, Regine, and Mathias Seidel, editors. Egypt: The World of the Pharaohs. Konemann, 1998.
2. Siliotti Alberto. Guide to the valley of the Kings. Barnes & Noble books, 1997.
3. Weeks, Kent R. Valley of the Kings. Friedman / Fairfax, 2001.
4. Wilkinson, Richard H. The Complete Temples of Ancient Egypt. Thames & Hudson, 2017.
