= Ramesses II =

Pharaoh of Egypt from 1279 to 1213 BC

- Ramses II, Ramesses the Great, Ozymandias
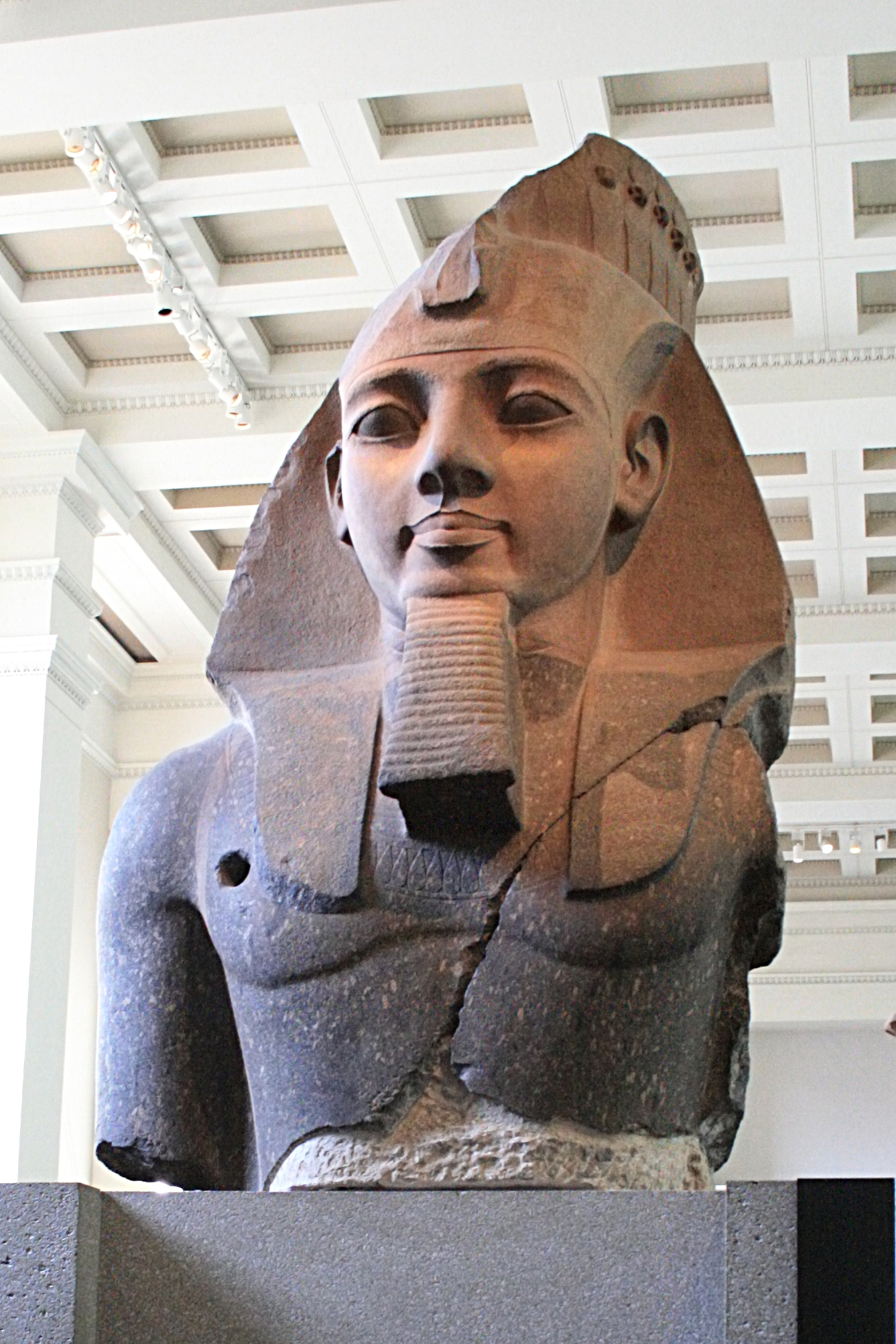
- The Younger Memnon (c. 1250 BC), a statue depicting Ramesses II, from the Ramesseum in Luxor (Thebes). Currently on display at the British Museum in London.

Pharaoh
- Reign: 31 May 1279 BC – 27 Jul 1213 BC
- Predecessor: Seti I
- Successor: Merneptah
Royal titulary
Horus name
Ka nakht, Mery maat
Kꜣ-nḫt mrj-Mꜣꜥt
The strong bull, beloved of right (truth)
G5	E1 D44 C10 mr
Nebty name
Mek kemet, waf khasut
Mk-Kmt wꜥf-ḫꜣswt
Protector of Egypt who curbs foreign lands
G16
G20 V31 I6 t O49 G45 f Z7; D44 N25 t Z2
Golden Horus
User renput, aa nakhtu
Wsr-rnpwt ꜥꜣ-nḫtw
Rich in years – great in victories
G8	wsr s M4 M4 M4 O29 D44 Z2
Prenomen
User maat Re, setep en Re
Wsr-mꜣꜥt-Rꜥ stp.n-Rꜥ
The justice of Rê is powerful – chosen of Rê

M23 X1 L2 X1	ra wsr mAat ra stp n
Nomen
Ra mes su, mery Amun
Rꜥ-ms-sw mrj-Jmn
Rê is the one who bore him, beloved of Amun

G39 N5	i mn n N36 ra Z1 ms s sw
- Consorts: Nefertari, Isetnofret, Maathorneferure, Meritamen, Bintanath, Nebettawy, Henutmire
- Children: 88–103 (List of children of Ramesses II)
- Father: Seti I
- Mother: Tuya
- Born: c. 1303 BC
- Died: 27 July 1213 BC (aged 90–91)
- Burial: KV7; Mummy found in the Deir el-Bahari royal cache (Theban Necropolis)
- Monuments: Abu Simbel, Abydos, Ramesseum, Luxor, Karnak, Gerf Hussein, Aswan
- Dynasty: 19th Dynasty

Ramesses II (Note: Other Egyptian transliterations include Ramses and Rameses (from Koine Greek: Ῥαμέσσης, Rhaméssēs).) (/ˈræməsiːz, ˈræmsiːz, ˈræmziːz/; Ancient Egyptian: rꜥ-ms-sw, Rīꜥa-masē-sə, (Note: Meaning "Ra is the one who bore him" in the Egyptian language.) Ancient Egyptian pronunciation: [ɾiːʕamaˈseːsə]; c. 1303 BC – 1213 BC), commonly known as Ramesses the Great, was the third pharaoh of the Nineteenth Dynasty of Egypt. Ramesses II is often regarded as the greatest, most celebrated, and most powerful pharaoh of the New Kingdom, which itself was the most powerful period of ancient Egypt. He is also widely considered one of ancient Egypt's most successful warrior pharaohs, conducting no fewer than 15 military campaigns, all resulting in victories except the Battle of Kadesh, which is generally considered a stalemate. His 66-year rule was also the longest recorded reign of any pharaoh (and one of the longest in history), possibly alongside Pepi II, who lived 1,000 years earlier and is said to have reigned for over 90 years.

In ancient Greek sources, he is called Ozymandias, (Note: Koine Greek: Ὀσυμανδύας, Osymandýas.) derived from the first part of his Egyptian-language regnal name: Usermaatre Setepenre. (Note: "The Maat of Ra is powerful—chosen of Ra.") Contemporary documents, particularly cuneiform letters discovered at Hattusa indicate that the name Ramesses was pronounced Riamessesa and the full titulary was pronounced Wasmuriya Satepnaria Riamessesa Maiamana. Ramesses was also referred to as the "Great God" by successor pharaohs, who prayed to enjoy his longevity and glory.

Ramesses ascended to the throne at age 25, and for the early part of his reign, he focused on building cities, temples, and monuments. After establishing the city of Pi-Ramesses in the Nile Delta, he designated it as Egypt's new capital and used it as the main staging point for his campaigns in Syria. Ramesses led several military expeditions into the Levant, where he reasserted Egyptian control over Canaan and Phoenicia; he also led a number of expeditions into Nubia, all commemorated in inscriptions at Beit el-Wali and Gerf Hussein. He celebrated an unprecedented thirteen or fourteen Sed festivals—more than any other pharaoh.

Estimates of his age at death vary, although 90 or 91 is considered to be the most likely figure. Upon his death, he was buried in a tomb (KV7) in the Valley of the Kings; his body was later moved to the Royal Cache, where it was discovered by archaeologists in 1881. Ramesses' mummy is now on display at the National Museum of Egyptian Civilization, located in the city of Cairo. Ramesses II was one of the few pharaohs who was worshipped as a deity during his lifetime.

Scholars dispute Ramesses II's association with the popular and contemporary depiction of him as the pharaoh of The Exodus, including former Secretary-General of Egypt's Supreme Council of Antiquities Mostafa Wazir and Jewish historian Lester L. Grabbe.

== Early life ==
Ramesses II was not born a prince. His grandfather, Ramesses I, was a vizier (tjaty) and military officer during the reign of pharaoh Horemheb, who appointed Ramesses I as his successor; at that time, Ramesses II was about eleven years old.

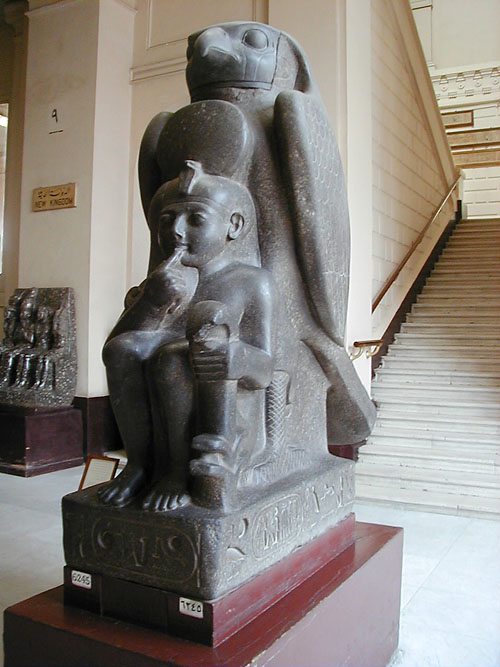
Ramesses II as a child embraced by Hauron (Egyptian Museum, Cairo)

After Ramesses I died, his son, Seti I became king, and designated his son Ramesses II as prince regent at about the age of fourteen.

== Reign length ==
Ramesses's date of accession to the throne is recorded as III Shemu (11th month), day 27, which most Egyptologists believe to be 31 May 1279 BC.

The Jewish historian Josephus, in his book Contra Apionem which included material from Manetho's Aegyptiaca, assigned Ramesses II ("Armesses Miamun") a reign of 66 years, 2 months. This is essentially confirmed by the calendar of Papyrus Gurob fragment L, where Year 67, I Akhet day 18 of Ramesses II is immediately followed by Year 1, II Akhet day 19 of Merneptah (Ramesses II's son), meaning Ramesses II died about 2 months into his 67th Regnal year.

In 1994, A. J. Peden proposed that Ramesses II died between days 3 and 13 of II Akhet on the basis of Theban graffito 854+855, equated to Merneptah's Year 1 II Akhet day 2. The workman's village of Deir el-Medina preserves a fragment of a mid-20th dynasty necropolis journal (P. Turin prov. nr. 8538 recto I, 5; unpublished) which records that the date II Akhet day 6 was a Free feast day for the "Sailing of UsimaRe-Setepenre." (for Ramesses II). As the Egyptologist Robert J. Demarée notes in a 2016 paper:

The feast called ẖnw – 'Sailing' – was clearly observed in Thebes or at Deir el-Medina during the Ramesside Period in remembrance of the passing of deified royals. The 'Sailing' of Ahmose-Nefertari was celebrated on II Shemu 15; the 'Sailing' of Seti I on III Shemu 24; and the 'Sailing' of Ramesses II on II Akhet 6.

The date of Ramesses II's recorded death on II Akhet (2nd month) day 6 falls perfectly within Peden's estimated timeline for the king's death in the interval between II Akhet day 3 and II Akhet day 13. This means that Ramesses II died on 27 July 1213 BC (Year 67, II Akhet day 6), after reigning 66 years and 74 days. (Note: That is, 66 years, 2 months, and 14 days according to the Egyptian calendar, which does not match the Julian nor Gregorian calendar. All twelve Egyptian months had exactly 30 days, with an additional intercalary month of 5 days to complete the 365-cycle.) This also falls perfectly within the calculations of Jürgen von Beckerath, who placed Ramesses' death between 24 July and 3 August 1213 BC.

== Military campaigns ==
Early in his life, Ramesses II embarked on numerous campaigns to restore possession of previously held territories lost to the Nubians and Hittites and to secure Egypt's borders. He was also responsible for suppressing some Nubian revolts and carrying out a campaign in Libya. Though the Battle of Kadesh often dominates the scholarly view of Ramesses II's military prowess and power, he nevertheless enjoyed more than a few outright victories over Egypt's enemies. During his reign, the Egyptian army is estimated to have totaled some 100,000 men: a formidable force that he used to strengthen Egyptian influence.

=== Battle against Sherden pirates ===
In his second year, Ramesses II decisively defeated the Sherden sea pirates who were wreaking havoc along Egypt's Mediterranean coast by attacking cargo-laden vessels travelling the sea routes to Egypt. The Sherden people probably came from the coast of Ionia, from southwest Anatolia or perhaps, also from the island of Sardinia. Ramesses posted troops and ships at strategic points along the coast and patiently lured the pirates to attack their perceived prey before ambushing them in a sea battle and capturing them all in a single action. A stele from Tanis speaks of them coming "in their war-ships from the midst of the sea, and none were able to stand before them". There probably was a naval battle somewhere near the mouth of the Nile, as shortly afterward, many Sherden are seen among the pharaoh's body-guard where they are conspicuous by their horned helmets with a ball projecting from the middle, their round shields, and the great Naue II swords with which they are depicted in inscriptions of the Battle of Kadesh. In that sea battle, together with the Sherden, the pharaoh also defeated the Lukka (L'kkw, possibly the people later known as the Lycians), and the Šqrsšw (Shekelesh) peoples.

=== Syrian campaigns ===
==== First Syrian campaign ====
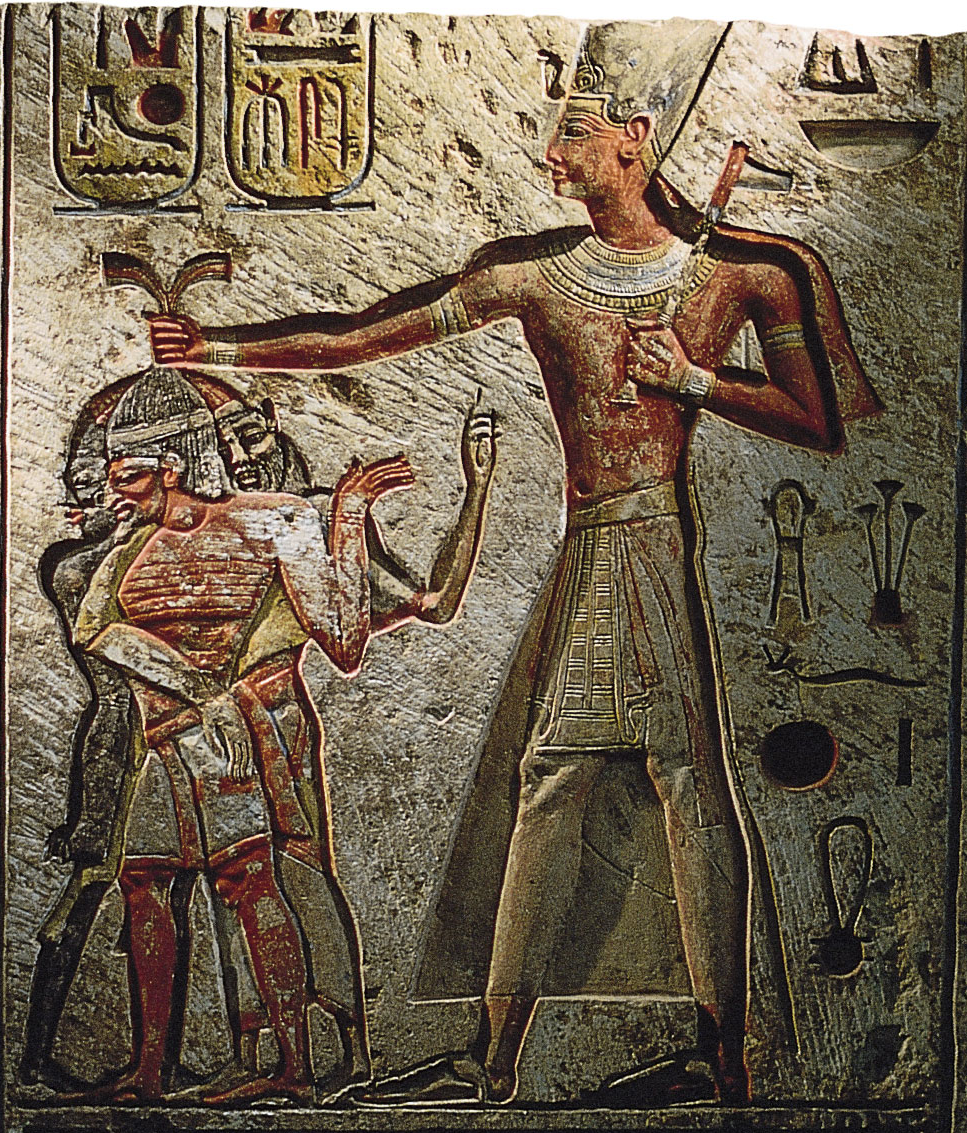
A relief of Ramesses II from Memphis showing him capturing enemies: a Nubian, a Libyan and a Syrian, c. 1250 BC. Cairo Museum.

The immediate antecedents to the Battle of Kadesh were the early campaigns of Ramesses II into Canaan. His first campaign seems to have taken place in the fourth year of his reign and was commemorated by the erection of what became the first of the Commemorative stelae of Nahr el-Kalb near what is now Beirut. The inscription is almost totally illegible due to weathering.

In the fourth year of his reign, he captured the Hittite vassal state of the Amurru during his campaign in Syria.

==== Second Syrian campaign ====
The Battle of Kadesh in his fifth regnal year was the climactic engagement in a campaign that Ramesses fought in Syria, against the resurgent Hittite forces of Muwatalli II. The pharaoh wanted a victory at Kadesh both to expand Egypt's frontiers into Syria, and to emulate his father Seti I's triumphal entry into the city just a decade or so earlier.

He also constructed his new capital, Pi-Ramesses. There he built factories to manufacture weapons, chariots, and shields, supposedly producing some 1,000 weapons in a week, about 250 chariots in two weeks, and 1,000 shields in a week and a half. After these preparations, Ramesses moved to attack territory in the Levant, which belonged to a more substantial enemy than any he had ever faced in war: the Hittite Empire.

After advancing through Canaan for exactly a month, according to the Egyptian sources, Ramesses arrived at Kadesh on 1 May 1274 BC. Here, Ramesses' troops were caught in a Hittite ambush and were initially outnumbered by the enemy, whose chariotry smashed through the second division of Ramesses' forces and attacked his camp. Receiving reinforcements from other Egyptian divisions arriving on the battlefield, the Egyptians counterattacked and routed the Hittites, whose survivors abandoned their chariots and swam the Orontes River to reach the safe city walls. Although left in possession of the battlefield, Ramesses, logistically unable to sustain a long siege, returned to Egypt. While Ramesses claimed a great victory, and this was technically true in terms of the actual battle, it is generally considered that the Hittites were the ultimate victors as far as the overall campaign was concerned, since the Egyptians retreated after the battle, and Hittite forces invaded and briefly occupied the Egyptian possessions in the region of Damascus.

==== Third Syrian campaign ====
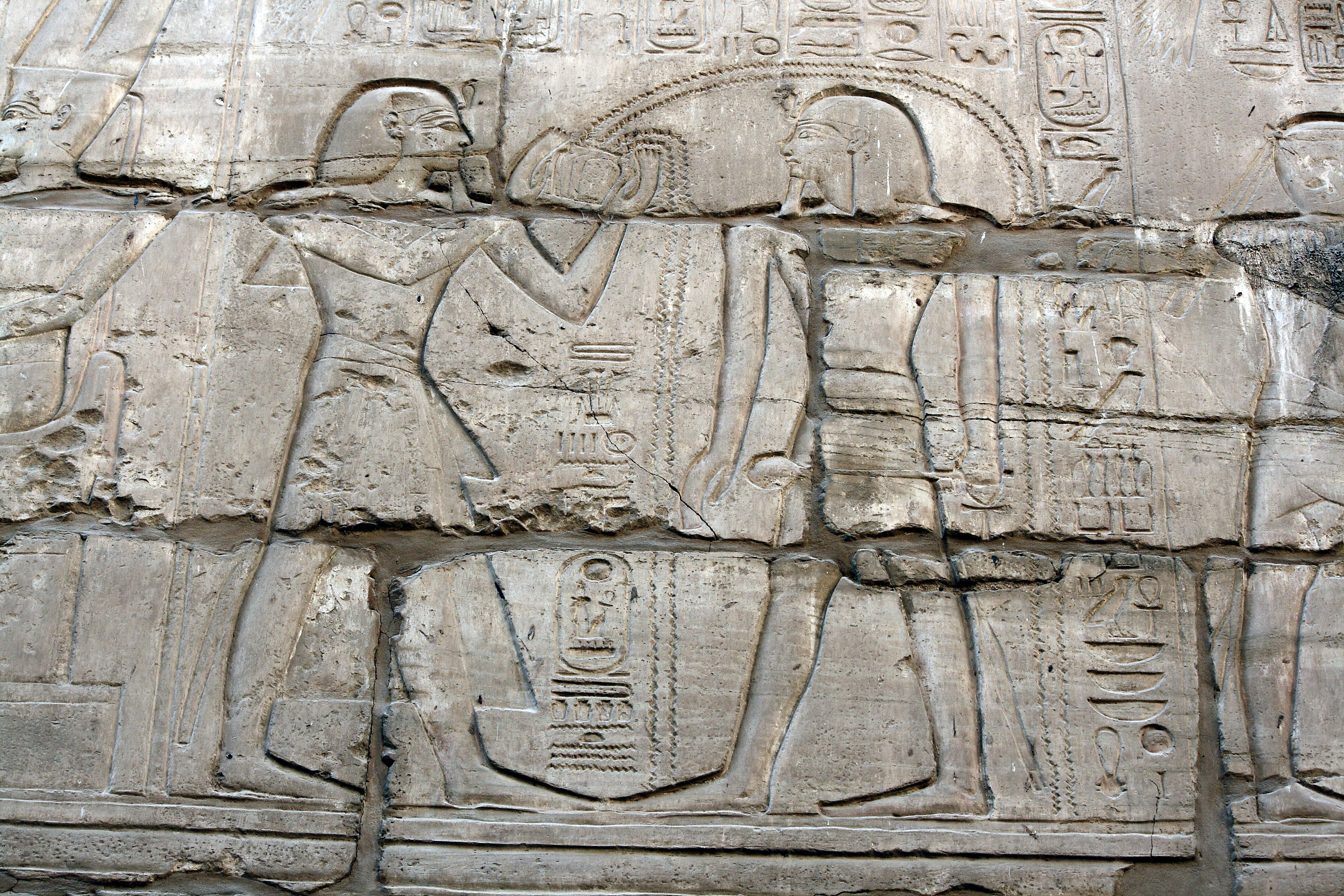
A relief from Karnak showing Ramesses II giving offerings to his deified father Seti I, Great Hypostyle Hall

Egypt's sphere of influence was now restricted to Canaan while Syria fell into Hittite hands. Canaanite princes, seemingly encouraged by the Egyptian incapacity to impose their will and goaded on by the Hittites, began revolts against Egypt. Ramesses II was not willing to let this stand, and prepared to contest the Hittite advance with new military campaigns. Because they are recorded on his monuments with few indications of precise dates or the regnal year, the precise chronology of the subsequent campaigns is not clear. Late in the seventh year of his reign (April/May 1272 BC), Ramesses II returned to Syria again. This time he proved more successful against his Hittite foes. During this campaign he split his army into two forces. One force was led by his son, Amun-her-khepeshef, and it chased warriors of the Šhasu tribes across the Negev as far as the Dead Sea, capturing Edom-Seir. It then marched on to capture Moab. The other force, led by Ramesses himself, attacked Jerusalem and Jericho. He, too, then entered Moab, where he rejoined his son. The reunited army then marched on Hesbon, Damascus, on to Kumidi, and finally, recaptured Upi (the land around Damascus), reestablishing Egypt's former sphere of influence.

==== Later Syrian campaigns ====
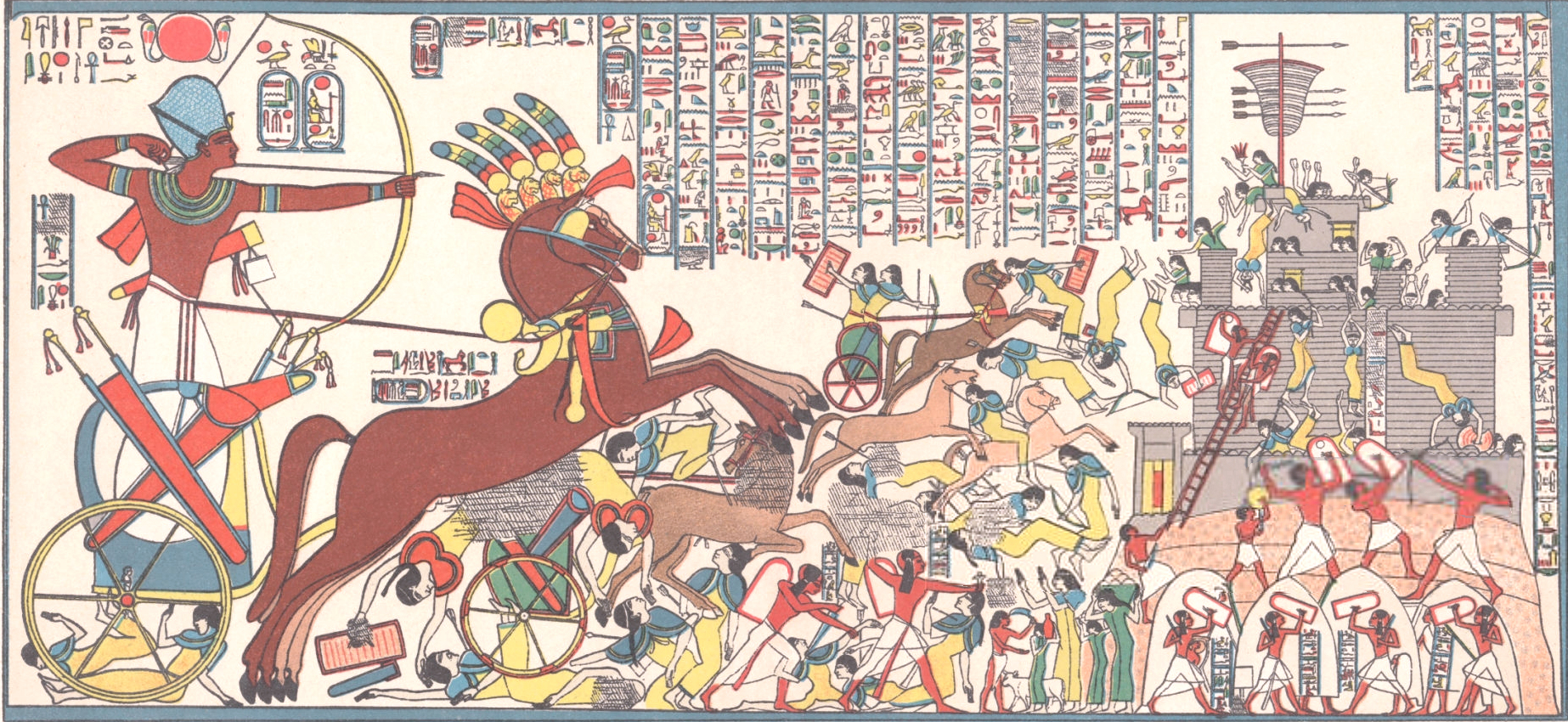
Color reproduction of the relief depicting Ramesses II storming the Hittite fortress of Dapur

Ramesses extended his military successes in his eighth and ninth years. He crossed the Dog River (Nahr al-Kalb) and pushed north into Amurru. His armies managed to march as far north as Dapur, where he had a statue of himself erected. The Egyptian pharaoh thus found himself in northern Amurru, well past Kadesh, in Tunip, where no Egyptian soldier had been seen since the time of Thutmose III, almost 120 years earlier. He laid siege to Dapur before capturing it, and returning to Egypt. By November 1272 BC, Ramesses was back in Egypt, at Heliopolis. His victory in the north proved ephemeral. After having reasserted his power over Canaan, Ramesses led his army north. A mostly illegible stele at the Dog River near Beirut, (Lebanon), which appears to be dated to the king's second year, was probably set up there in his tenth year (1269 BC). The thin strip of territory pinched between Amurru and Kadesh did not make for a stable possession. Within a year, they had returned to the Hittite fold, so that Ramesses had to march against Dapur once more in his tenth year. This time he claimed to have fought the battle without even bothering to put on his corslet, until two hours after the fighting began. Six of Ramesses's youthful sons, still wearing their side locks, took part in this conquest. He took towns in Retjenu, and Tunip in Naharin, later recorded on the walls of the Ramesseum. This second success at the location was equally as meaningless as his first, as neither power could decisively defeat the other in battle. In year eighteen, Ramesses erected a stele at Beth Shean, on 19 January 1261 BC.

=== Peace treaty with the Hittites ===
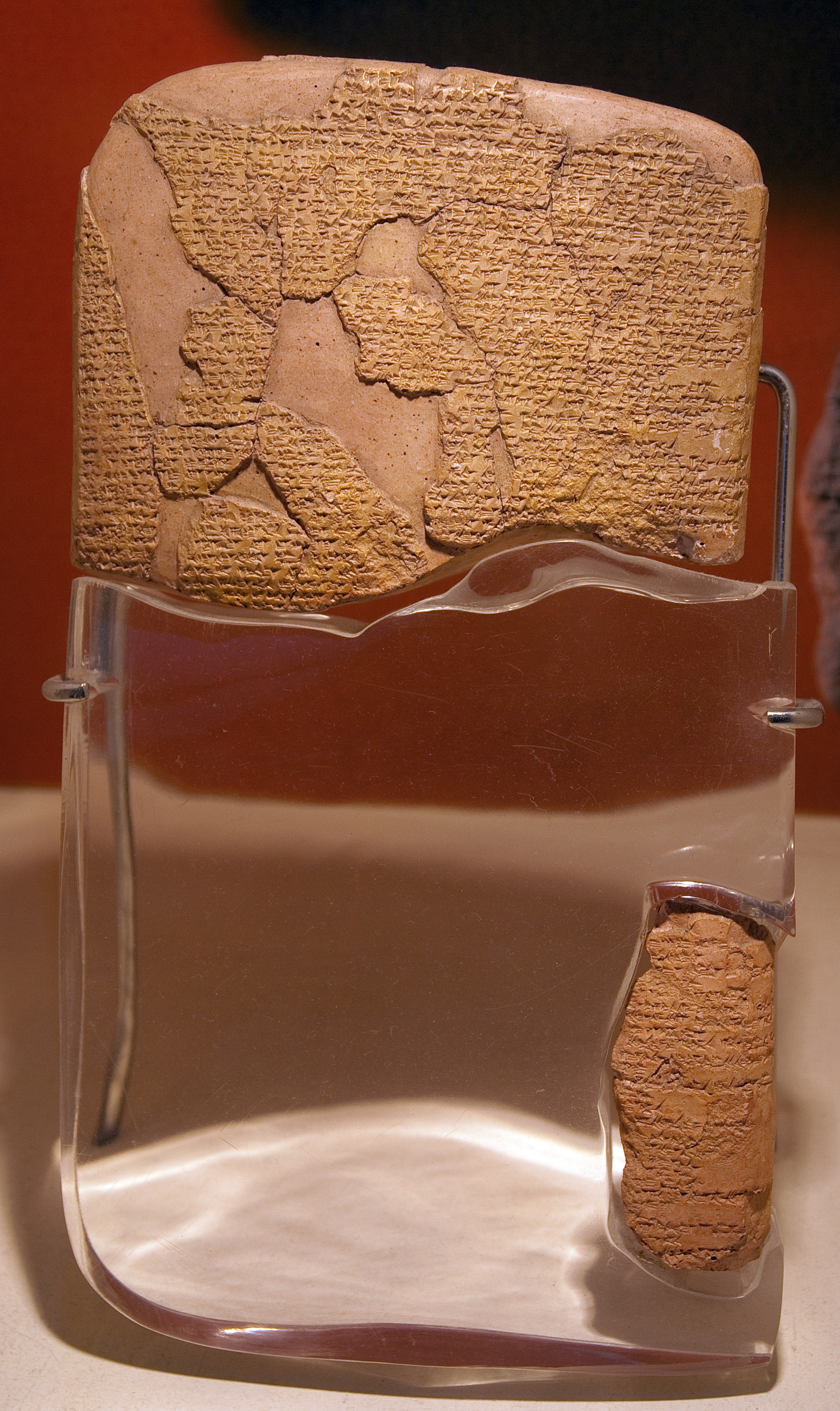
Tablet of treaty between Ḫattušili III of Hatti and Ramesses II of Egypt, at the İstanbul Archaeology Museums

In Year 21 of Ramesses's reign, he concluded a peace treaty with the Hittites known to modern scholars as the Treaty of Kadesh. Though this treaty settled the disputes over Canaan, its immediate impetus seems to have been a diplomatic crisis that occurred following Ḫattušili III's accession to the Hittite throne. Ḫattušili had come to power by deposing his nephew Muršili III in the brief and bitter Hittite Civil War. Though the deposed king was initially sent into exile in Syria, he subsequently attempted to regain power and fled to Egypt once these attempts were discovered.

When Ḫattušili demanded his extradition, Ramesses II denied any knowledge of his whereabouts. When Ḫattušili insisted that Muršili was in Egypt, Ramesses's response suggested that Ḫattušili was being deceived by his subjects. This demand precipitated a crisis, and the two empires came close to war. Eventually, in the twenty-first year of his reign (1259 BC), Ramesses concluded an agreement at Kadesh to end the conflict.

The peace treaty was recorded in two versions, one in Egyptian hieroglyphs, the other in Hittite, using cuneiform script; both versions survive. Such dual-language recording is common to many subsequent treaties. This treaty differs from others, in that the two language versions are worded differently. While the majority of the text is identical, the Hittite version says the Egyptians came suing for peace and the Egyptian version says the reverse. The treaty was given to the Egyptians in the form of a silver plaque, and this "pocket-book" version was taken back to Egypt and carved into the temple at Karnak. The Egyptian account records Ramesses II's receipt of the Hittite peace treaty tablets on I Peret 21 of Year 21, corresponding to 10 November 1259 BC, according to the standard "Low Chronology" used by Egyptologists.

The treaty was concluded between Ramesses II and Ḫattušili III in year 21 of Ramesses's reign (c. 1259 BC). Its 18 articles call for peace between Egypt and Hatti and then proceeds to maintain that their respective deities also demand peace. The frontiers are not laid down in this treaty, but may be inferred from other documents. The Anastasy A papyrus describes Canaan during the latter part of the reign of Ramesses II and enumerates and names the Phoenician coastal towns under Egyptian control. The harbour town of Sumur, north of Byblos, is mentioned as the northernmost town belonging to Egypt, suggesting it contained an Egyptian garrison.

No further Egyptian campaigns in Canaan are mentioned after the conclusion of the peace treaty. The northern border seems to have been safe and quiet, so the rule of the pharaoh was strong until Ramesses II's death, and the subsequent waning of the dynasty. When the King of Mira attempted to involve Ramesses in a hostile act against the Hittites, the Egyptian responded that the times of intrigue in support of Mursili III, had passed. Ḫattušili III wrote to Kadashman-Enlil II, Kassite king of Karduniaš (Babylon) in the same spirit, reminding him of the time when his father, Kadashman-Turgu, had offered to fight Ramesses II, the king of Egypt. The Hittite king encouraged the Babylonian to oppose another enemy, which must have been the king of Assyria, whose allies had killed the messenger of the Egyptian king. Ḫattušili encouraged Kadashman-Enlil to come to his aid and prevent the Assyrians from cutting the link between the Canaanite province of Egypt and Mursili III, the ally of Ramesses.

=== Nubian campaigns ===
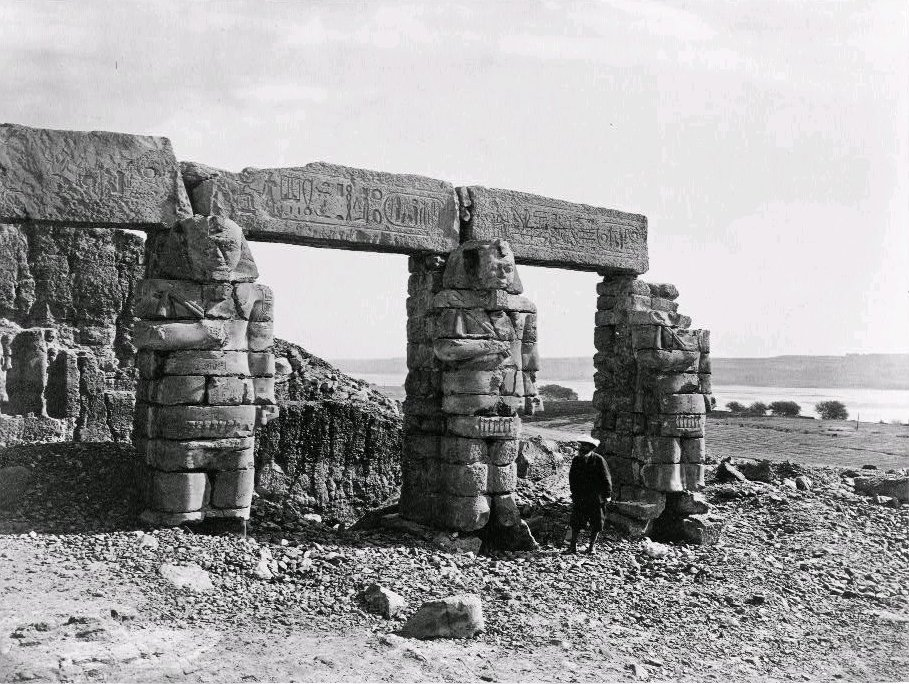
Part of Gerf Hussein temple, originally in Nubia

Ramesses II also campaigned south of the first cataract of the Nile into Nubia. When Ramesses was about 22 years old, two of his own sons, including Amun-her-khepeshef, accompanied him in at least one of those campaigns. By the time of Ramesses, Nubia had been a colony for 200 years, but its conquest was recalled in decoration from the temples Ramesses II built at Beit el-Wali (which was the subject of epigraphic work by the Oriental Institute during the Nubian salvage campaign of the 1960s), Gerf Hussein and Kalabsha in northern Nubia. On the south wall of the Beit el-Wali temple, Ramesses II is depicted charging into battle against tribes south of Egypt in a war chariot, while his two young sons, Amun-her-khepsef and Khaemwaset, are shown behind him, also in war chariots. A wall in one of Ramesses's temples says he had to fight one battle with those tribes without help from his soldiers.

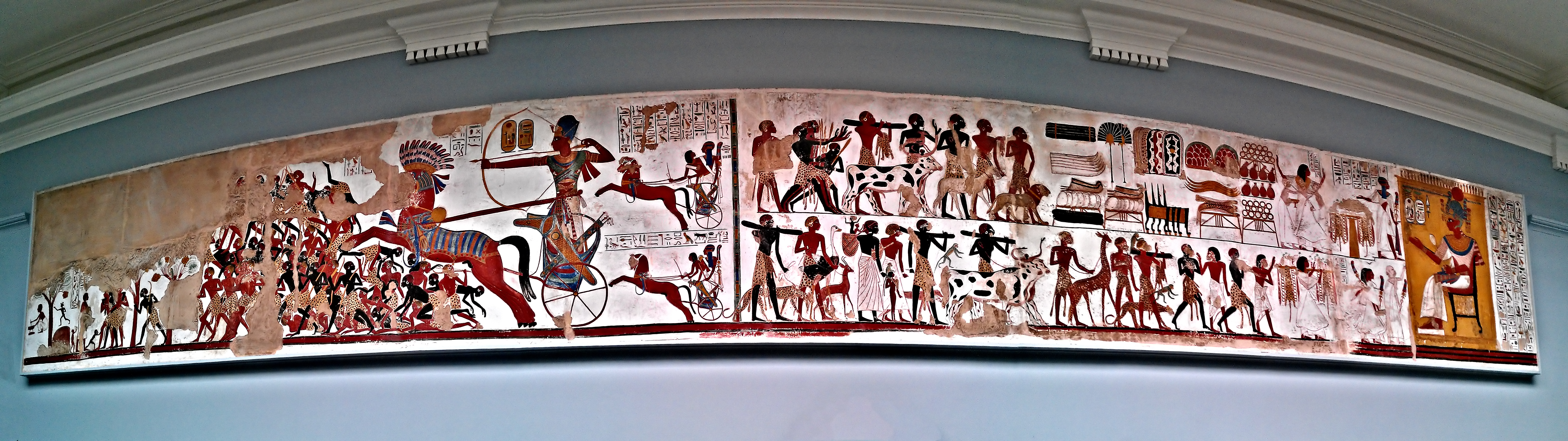
Wall Painting of the Temple of Beit El-Wali, which Ramses II constructed in Nubia now in the British Museum

=== Libyan campaigns ===
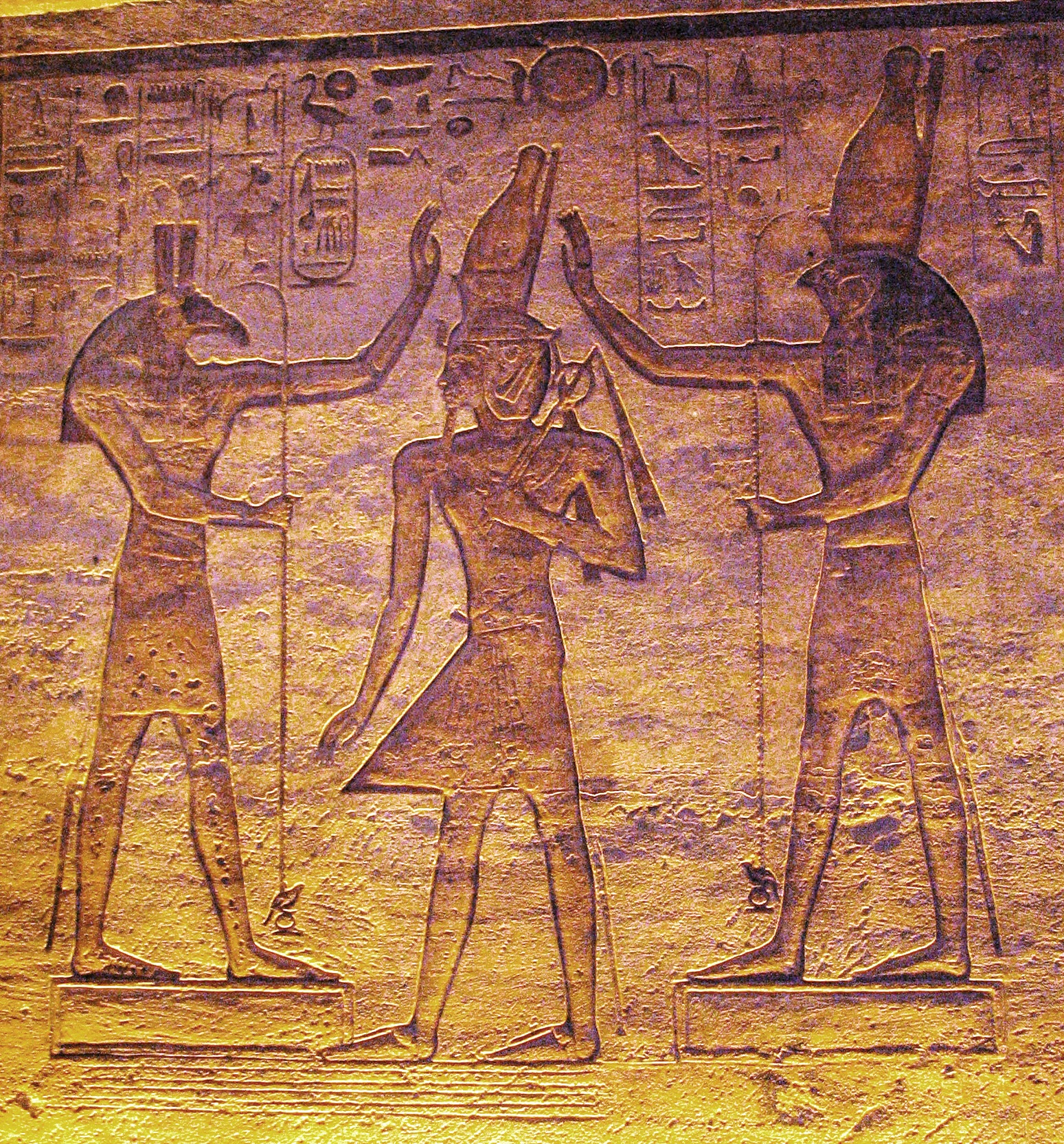
The gods Set (left) and Horus (right) blessing Ramesses II in the Small Temple at Abu Simbel

During the reign of Ramesses II, the Egyptians were evidently active on a 300-kilometre (190 mi) stretch along the Mediterranean coast, at least as far as Zawyet Umm El Rakham, where remains of a fortress described by its texts as built on Libyans land have been found. Although the exact events surrounding the foundation of the coastal forts and fortresses is not clear, some degree of political and military control must have been held over the region to allow their construction.

There are no detailed accounts of Ramesses II's undertaking large military actions against the Libyans, only generalised records of his conquering and crushing them, which may or may not refer to specific events that were otherwise unrecorded. It may be that some of the records, such as the Aswan Stele of his year 2, are harking back to Ramesses's presence on his father's Libyan campaigns. Perhaps it was Seti I who achieved this supposed control over the region, and who planned to establish the defensive system, in a manner similar to how he rebuilt those to the east, the Ways of Horus across Northern Sinai.

== Sed festivals ==
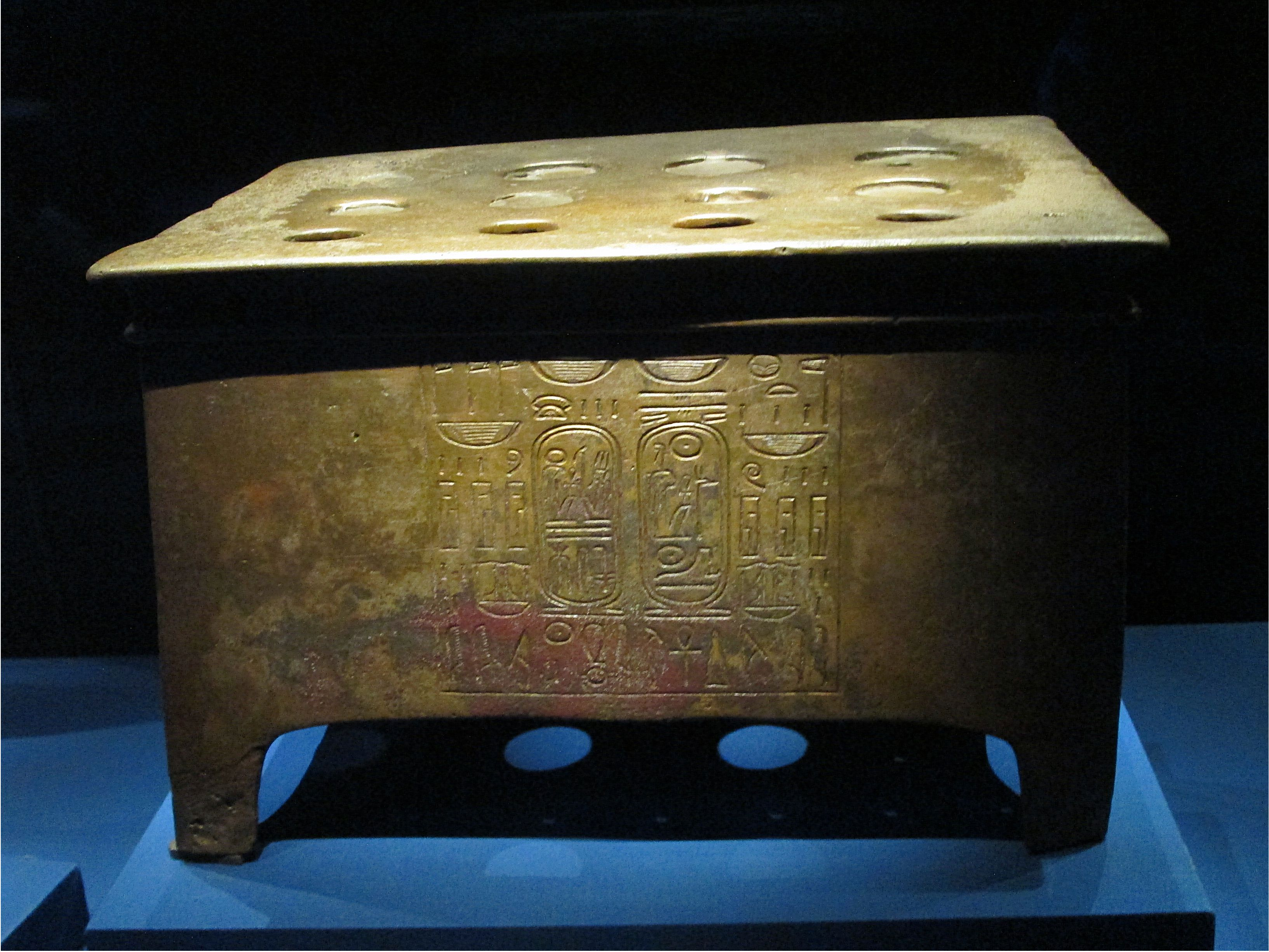
Bronze brazier of Ramesses II used for burning incense

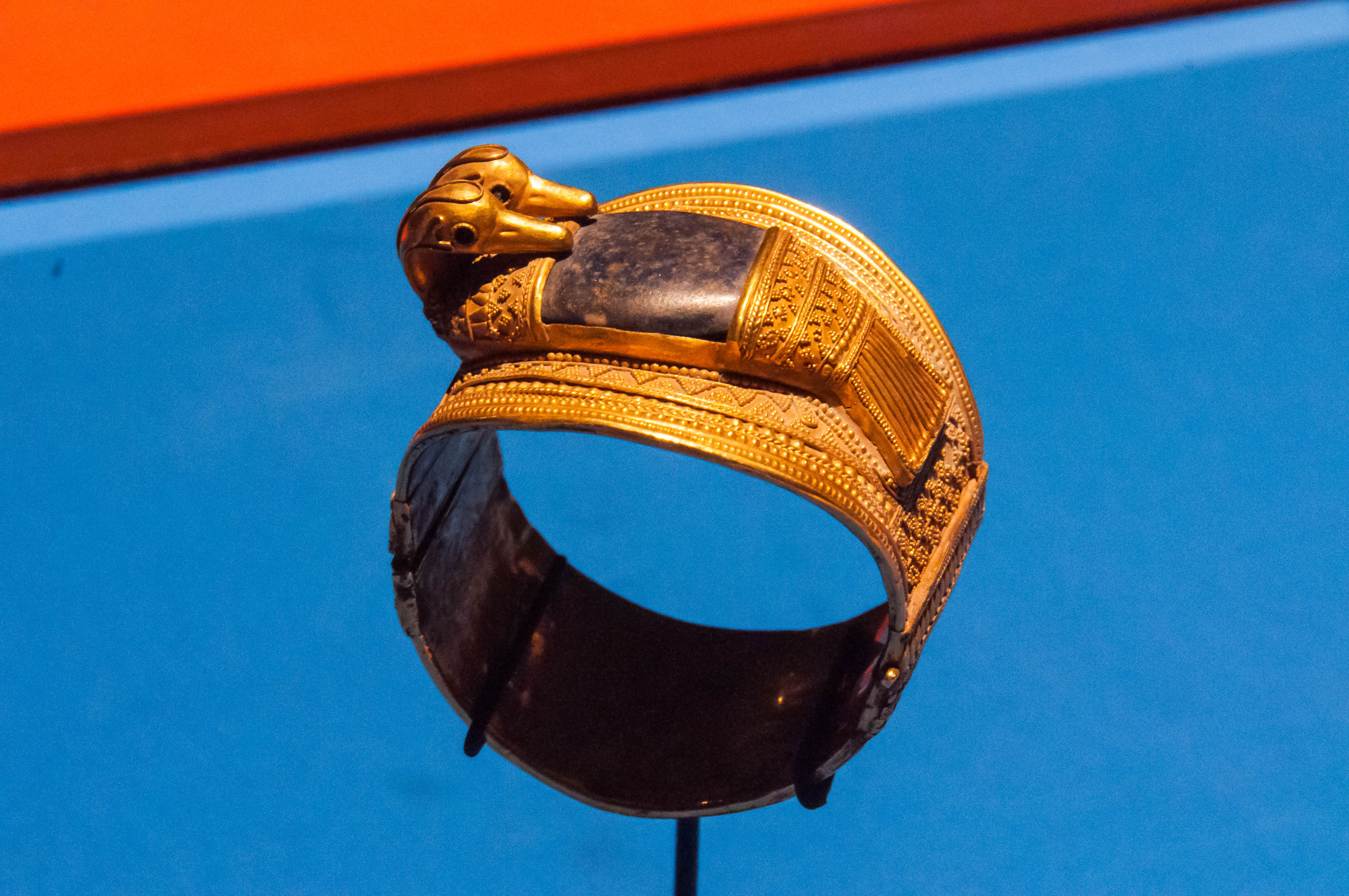
A gold and lapis lazuli duck-shaped bracelet of Ramesses II

As of Year 28 of his reign, Ramesses II favored the god Amun above all other divinities, as evidenced in the texts of two separate ostraca discovered at Deir el-Medina.

By tradition, in the 30th year of his reign, Ramesses celebrated a jubilee called the Sed festival. These were held to honour and rejuvenate the pharaoh's strength. Only halfway through what would be a 66-year reign, Ramesses had already eclipsed all but a few of his greatest predecessors in his achievements. He had brought peace, maintained Egyptian borders, and built numerous monuments across the empire. His country was more prosperous and powerful than it had been in nearly a century.

Sed festivals traditionally were held again every three years after the 30th year; Ramesses II, who sometimes held them after two years, eventually celebrated an unprecedented thirteen or fourteen.

== Building projects and monuments ==
In the third year of his reign, Ramesses started the most ambitious building project after the pyramids, which were built almost 1,500 years earlier. Ramesses built extensively from the Delta to Nubia, "covering the land with buildings in a way no monarch before him had."

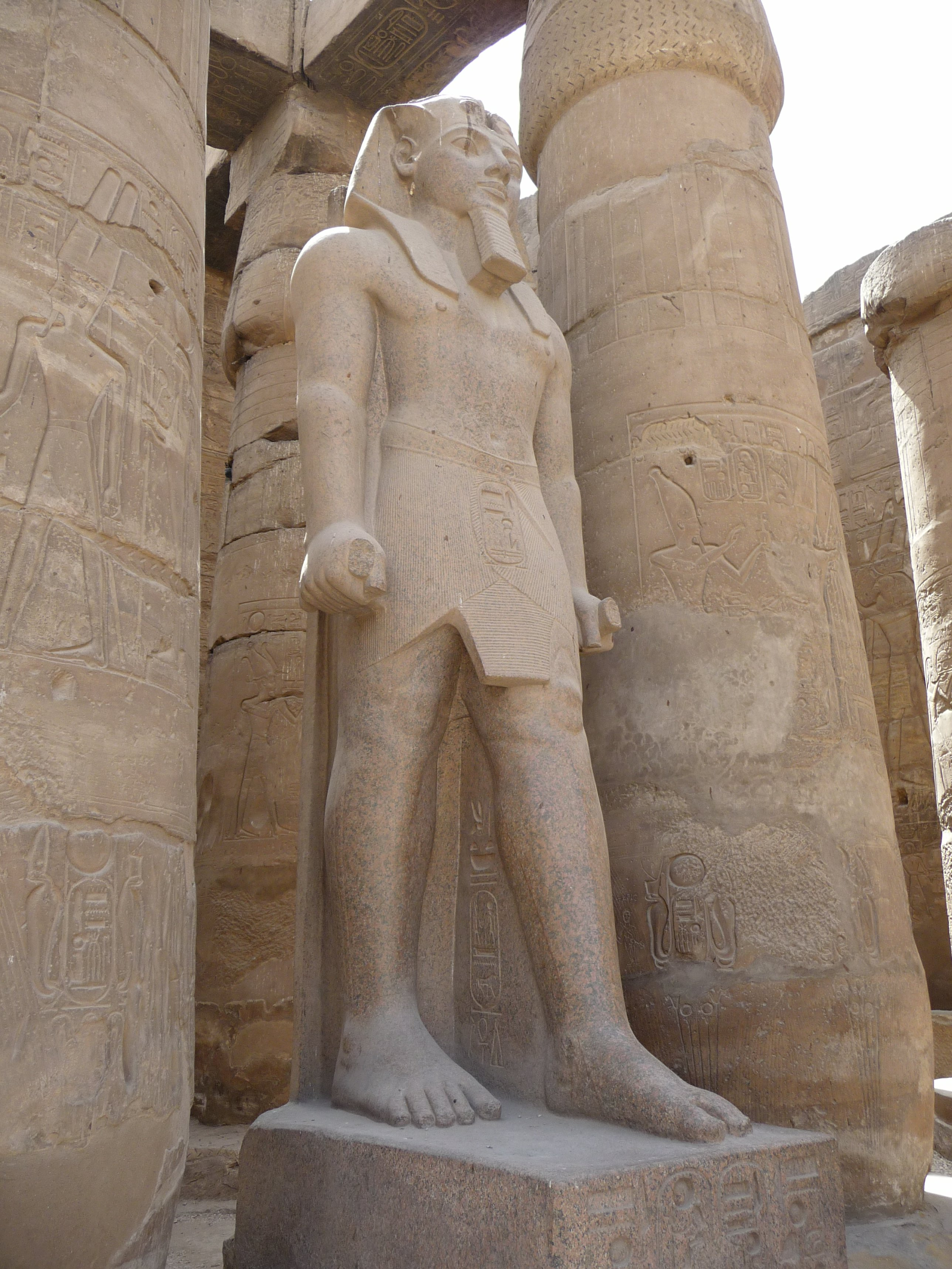
Colossal Statue of Ramesses II in the first peristyle court at Luxor

Some of the activities undertaken were focused on remodeling or usurping existing works, improving masonry techniques, and using art as propaganda.

- In Thebes, the ancient temples were transformed, so that each of them reflected honour to Ramesses as a symbol of his putative divine nature and power.
- The elegant but shallow reliefs of previous pharaohs were easily transformed, and so their images and words could easily be obliterated by their successors. Ramesses insisted that his carvings be deeply engraved into the stone, which made them not only less susceptible to later alteration, but also made them more prominent in the Egyptian sun, reflecting his relationship with the sun deity, Ra.
- Ramesses used art as a means of propaganda for his victories over foreigners, which are depicted on numerous temple reliefs.
- His cartouches are prominently displayed even in buildings that he did not construct.
- He founded a new capital city in the Delta during his reign, called Pi-Ramesses. It previously had served as a summer palace during Seti I's reign.
- Ramesses II expanded gold mining operations in Akuyati (modern day Wadi Allaqi).

Ramesses also undertook many new construction projects. Two of his biggest works, besides Pi-Ramesses, were the temple complex of Abu Simbel and the Ramesseum, a mortuary temple in western Thebes.

=== Pi-Ramesses ===
Ramesses II moved the capital of his kingdom from Thebes in the Nile valley to a new site in the eastern Delta. His motives are uncertain, although he possibly wished to be closer to his territories in Canaan and Syria. The new city of Pi-Ramesses (or to give the full name, Pi-Ramesses Aa-nakhtu, meaning "Domain of Ramesses, Great in Victory") was dominated by huge temples and his vast residential palace, complete with its own zoo. In the 10th century AD, the Bible exegete Rabbi Saadia Gaon believed that the biblical site of Ramesses had to be identified with Ain Shams. For a time, during the early 20th century, the site was misidentified as that of Tanis, due to the amount of statuary and other material from Pi-Ramesses found there, but it now is recognized that the Ramesside remains at Tanis were brought there from elsewhere, and the real Pi-Ramesses lies about 30 km (18.6 mi) south, near modern Qantir. The colossal feet of the statue of Ramesses are almost all that remains above ground today. The rest is buried in the fields.

=== Ramesseum ===
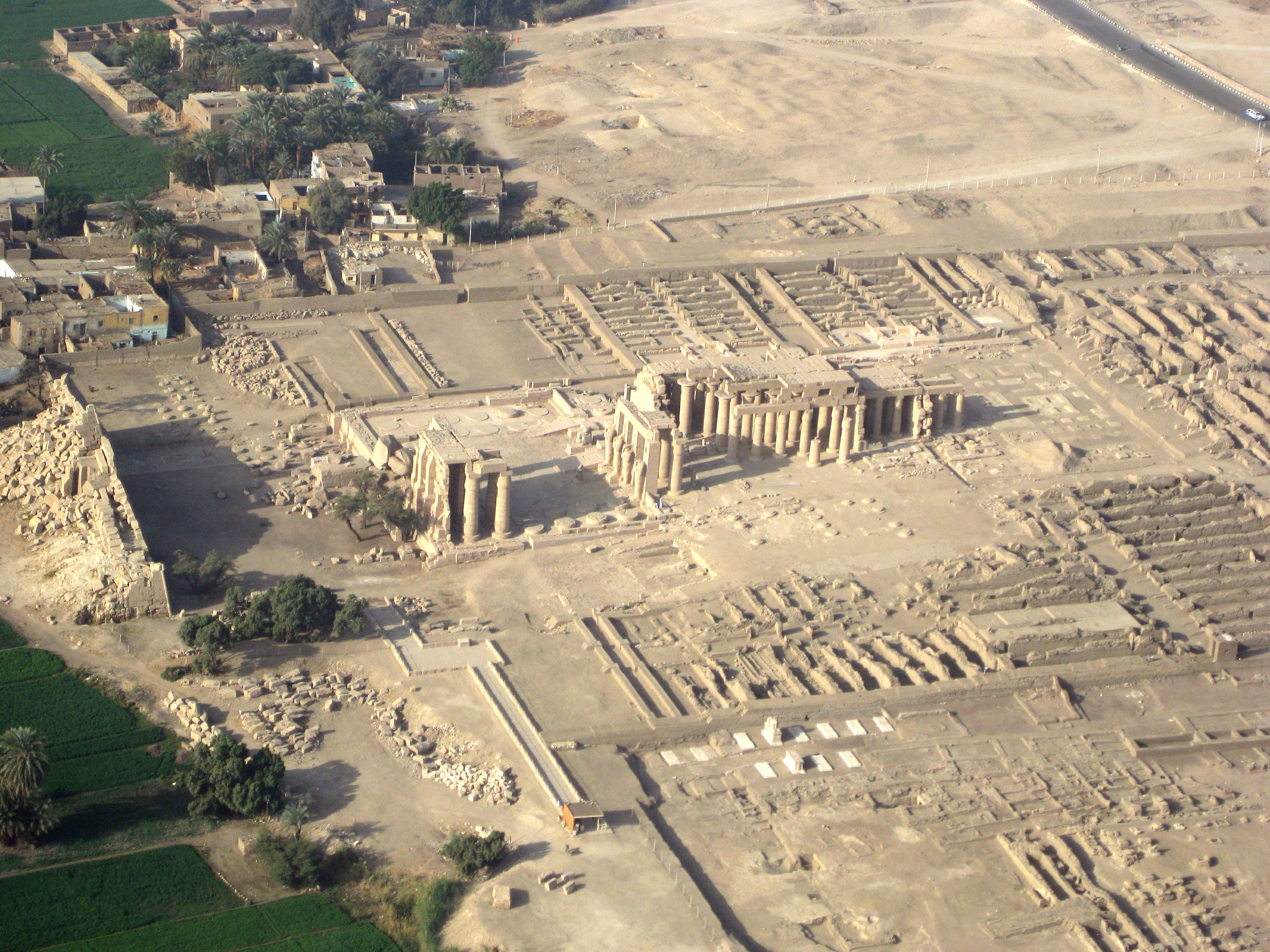
The remains of the Ramesseum in aerial view

The temple complex built by Ramesses II between Qurna and the desert has been known as the Ramesseum since the 19th century. The Greek historian Diodorus Siculus marveled at the gigantic temple, now no more than a few ruins.

Oriented northwest and southeast, the temple was preceded by two courts. An enormous pylon stood before the first court, with the royal palace at the left and the gigantic statue of the king at the back. Only fragments of the base and torso remain of the syenite statue of the enthroned pharaoh, 17 metres (56 ft) high and weighing more than 1,000 tonnes (980 long tons; 1,100 short tons). Scenes of the pharaoh and his army triumphing over the Hittite forces fleeing before Kadesh are represented on the pylon. Remains of the second court include part of the internal facade of the pylon and a portion of the Osiride portico on the right. Scenes of war and the alleged rout of the Hittites at Kadesh are repeated on the walls. In the upper registers, feast and honour of the phallic deity Min, god of fertility.

On the opposite side of the court, the few Osiride pillars and columns still remaining may furnish an idea of the original grandeur. Scattered remains of the two statues of the seated king also may be seen, one in pink granite and the other in black granite, which once flanked the entrance to the temple. Thirty-nine out of the forty-eight columns in the great hypostyle hall (41 × 31 m) still stand in the central rows. They are decorated with the usual scenes of the king before various deities. Part of the ceiling, decorated with gold stars on a blue ground, also has been preserved. Ramesses's children appear in the procession on the few walls left. The sanctuary was composed of three consecutive rooms, with eight columns and the tetrastyle cell. Part of the first room, with the ceiling decorated with astral scenes, and few remains of the second room are all that is left. Vast storerooms built of mud bricks stretched out around the temple. Traces of a school for scribes were found among the ruins.

A temple of Seti I, of which nothing remains beside the foundations, once stood to the right of the hypostyle hall.

=== Abu Simbel ===
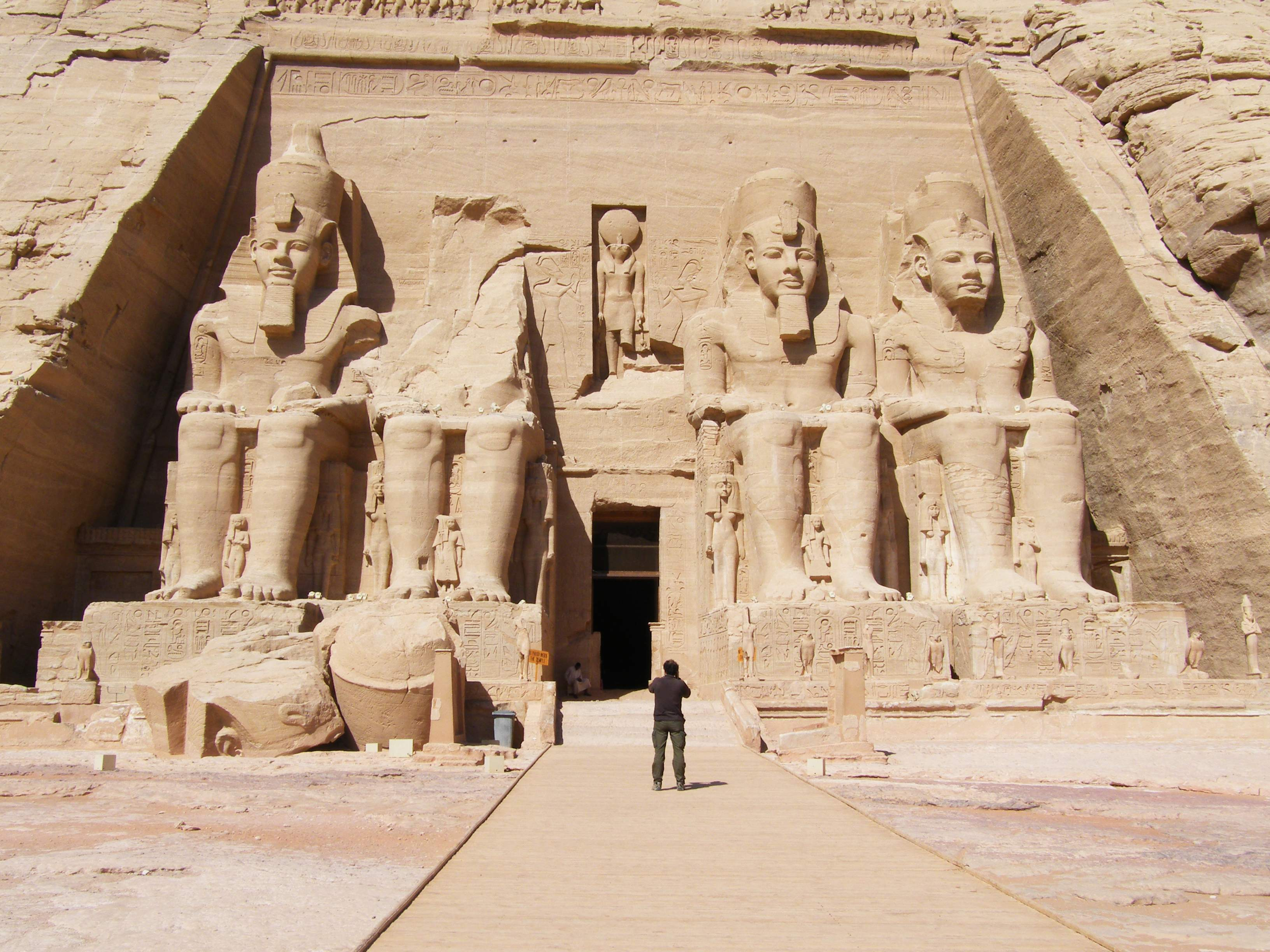
Facade of the Great Temple at Abu Simbel

In 1255 BC, Ramesses and his queen Nefertari had traveled into Nubia to inaugurate a new temple, Abu Simbel. It is said to be ego cast into stone; the man who built it intended not only to become Egypt's greatest pharaoh, but also one of its deities.

The temple at Abu Simbel was discovered in 1813 by the Swiss Orientalist and traveler Johann Ludwig Burckhardt. An enormous pile of sand almost completely covered the facade and its colossal statues, blocking the entrance for four more years. The Paduan explorer Giovanni Battista Belzoni reached the interior on 4 August 1817.

=== Other Nubian monuments ===
As well as the temples of Abu Simbel, Ramesses left other monuments to himself in Nubia. His early campaigns are illustrated on the walls of the Temple of Beit el-Wali (now relocated to New Kalabsha). Other temples dedicated to Ramesses are Derr and Gerf Hussein (also relocated to New Kalabsha). For the temple of Amun at Jebel Barkal, the temple's foundation probably dates during the reign of Thutmose III, while the temple was shaped during his reign and that of Ramesses II.

=== Other archeological discoveries ===
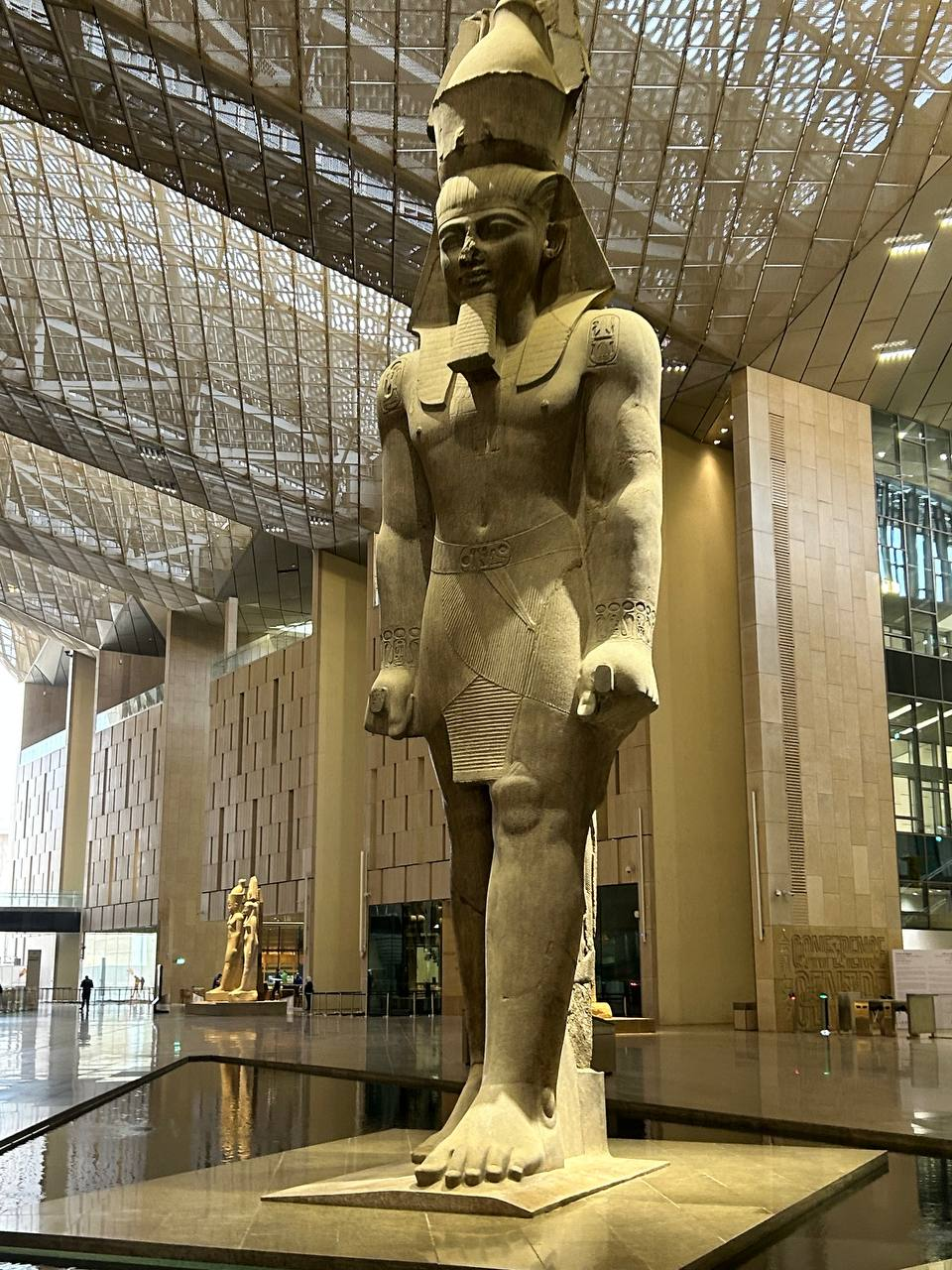
Statue of Ramesses II in the Grand Egyptian Museum, Giza, Egypt

The colossal statue of Ramesses II dates back 3,200 years, and was originally discovered in six pieces in a temple near Memphis, Egypt. Weighing some 83-tonne (82-long-ton; 91-short-ton), it was transported, reconstructed, and erected in Ramesses Square in Cairo in 1955. In August 2006, contractors relocated it to save it from exhaust fumes that were causing it to deteriorate. The new site is near the Grand Egyptian Museum.

In 2018, a group of archeologists in Cairo's Matariya neighborhood discovered pieces of a booth with a seat that, based on its structure and age, may have been used by Ramesses. "The royal compartment consists of four steps leading to a cubic platform, which is believed to be the base of the king's seat during celebrations or public gatherings," such as Ramesses' inauguration and Sed festivals. It may have also gone on to be used by others in the Ramesside Period, according to the mission's head. The excavation mission also unearthed "a collection of scarabs, amulets, clay pots and blocks engraved with hieroglyphic text."

In December 2019, a red granite royal bust of Ramesses II was unearthed by an Egyptian archaeological mission in the village of Mit Rahina in Giza. The bust depicted Ramesses II wearing a wig with the symbol "Ka" on his head. Its measurements were 55 cm (21.65 in) wide, 45 cm (17.71 in) thick and 105 cm (41.33 in) long. Alongside the bust, limestone blocks appeared showing Ramesses II during the Heb-Sed religious ritual. "This discovery is considered one of the rarest archaeological discoveries. It is the first-ever Ka statue made of granite to be discovered. The only Ka statue that was previously found is made of wood and it belongs to one of the kings of the 13th dynasty of ancient Egypt which is displayed at the Egyptian Museum in Tahrir Square," said archaeologist Mostafa Waziri.

In May 2023, French archaeologists from the Sorbonne University in Paris identified part of the original granite sarcophagus of Ramesses II. The fragment of granite sarcophagus had been reused by a high priest of the 21st Dynasty named Menkheperre, around 1000 BC but its original owner was unknown until Frédéric Payraudeau's careful analysis discovered the cartouche of Ramesses II on it. The sarcophagus dates back to approximately 1279–1213 BC, aligning with Ramesses II's reign and "its elaborate design and inscriptions underscore the artistic and religious conventions of the era." Payraudeau states in his study published in Revue d'Égyptologie:

"The quality of the craftsmanship and the specific references to deities like Ra and Osiris strongly indicate that this sarcophagus was initially intended for Ramesses II,"

In September 2024, it was published that during an archaeological excavation of a 3,200-year-old fort along the Nile, researches found a golden sword with Ramses II's signature on it.

== Death and burial ==
The last dated record of Ramesses II's reign is Year 67, the first month of the flood season (Akhet), day 18. The next date, on the same document, is Year 1 (of Merneptah), second month of Akhet day 18, suggesting that Ramesses II died within the intervening weeks.. Peter J. Brand who has now written two biographies of Seti I and Ramesses II states thus:

In records from the Twentieth Dynasty, we learn the royal-tomb builders in Thebes commemorated the sixth day of the second month of the Inundation Season (Akhet) as the “day of sailing” of Ramesses II. So in mid-July, ca. 1213 BCE, Ramesses II breathed his last. He appears to have died in the north of Egypt, most likely at Piramesses.

Brand stresses that "The day of a New Kingdom Pharaoh’s “sailing,” (hnw), is a euphemism for his death. The term hni also designates processions of divine cult images during religious festivals. Decades later, King Ramesses IV left a dedication text at Abydos in which he asked the gods to “...double for me the long lifespan and the extended reign of (Ramesses II), the great god... For indeed, (more) numerous are the things which I have done... than that which (Ramesses II)... did for you in his 67 years!” Classical authors including Manetho (third century BC) attributed Ramesses a reign of 66 years and 2 months. Accordingly, the length of Ramesses' reign appears to be sixty-six full years, with the king dying early in his sixty-seventh regnal year.

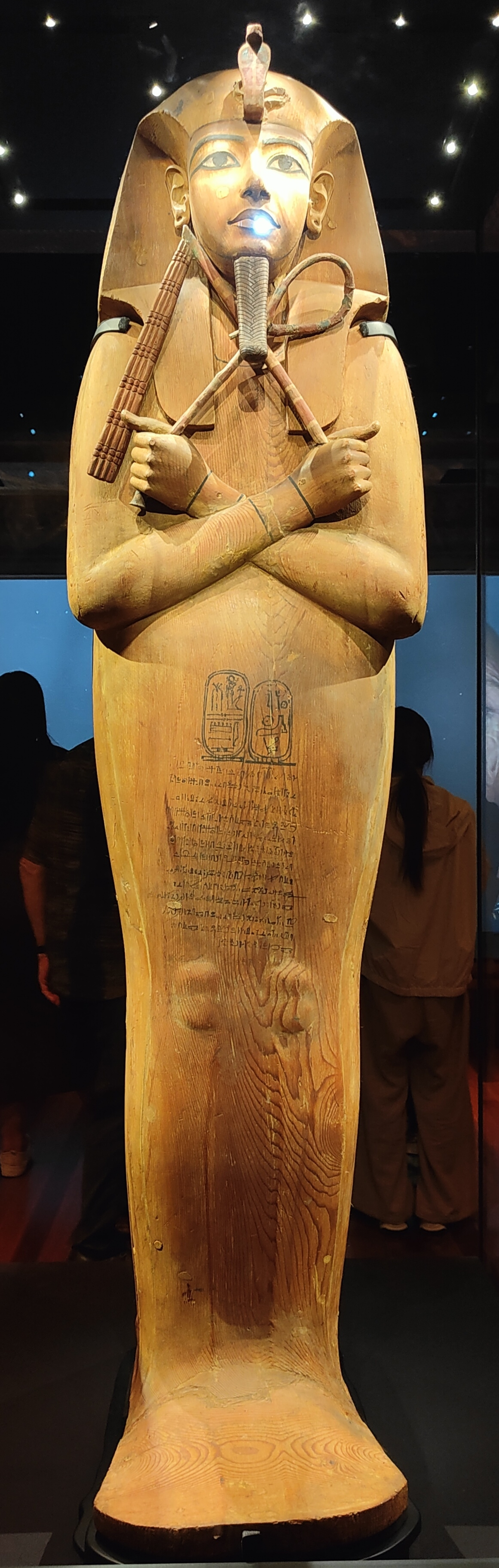
Coffin of Ramesses II

By the time of his death, aged about 90 years, Ramesses was suffering from severe dental problems and was plagued by arthritis, hardening of the arteries and heart disease. X-Ray and CT-scans of the mummy indicate that he may have walked with a pronounced stoop or hunch. His cause of death is unknown, but one possibility is the rupturing of an abscess in his jaw, causing severe infection.

=== Mummy ===
Originally Ramesses II was buried in tomb KV7 in the Valley of the Kings, but because of looting in the valley, priests later transferred the body to a holding area, re-wrapped it, and placed it inside the tomb of queen Ahmose Inhapy. Seventy-two hours later it was again moved, to the tomb of the high priest Pinedjem II. All of this is recorded in hieroglyphics on the linen covering the body of his coffin. His mummy was eventually discovered in 1881 in TT320 inside a reused but ordinary wooden coffin (Note: The coffin of Ramesses II is thought to have been originally commissioned for Horemheb before being reused for the reburial of Ramesses II during the Wehem Mesut.) and is now in Cairo's National Museum of Egyptian Civilization (until 3 April 2021 it was in the Egyptian Museum).

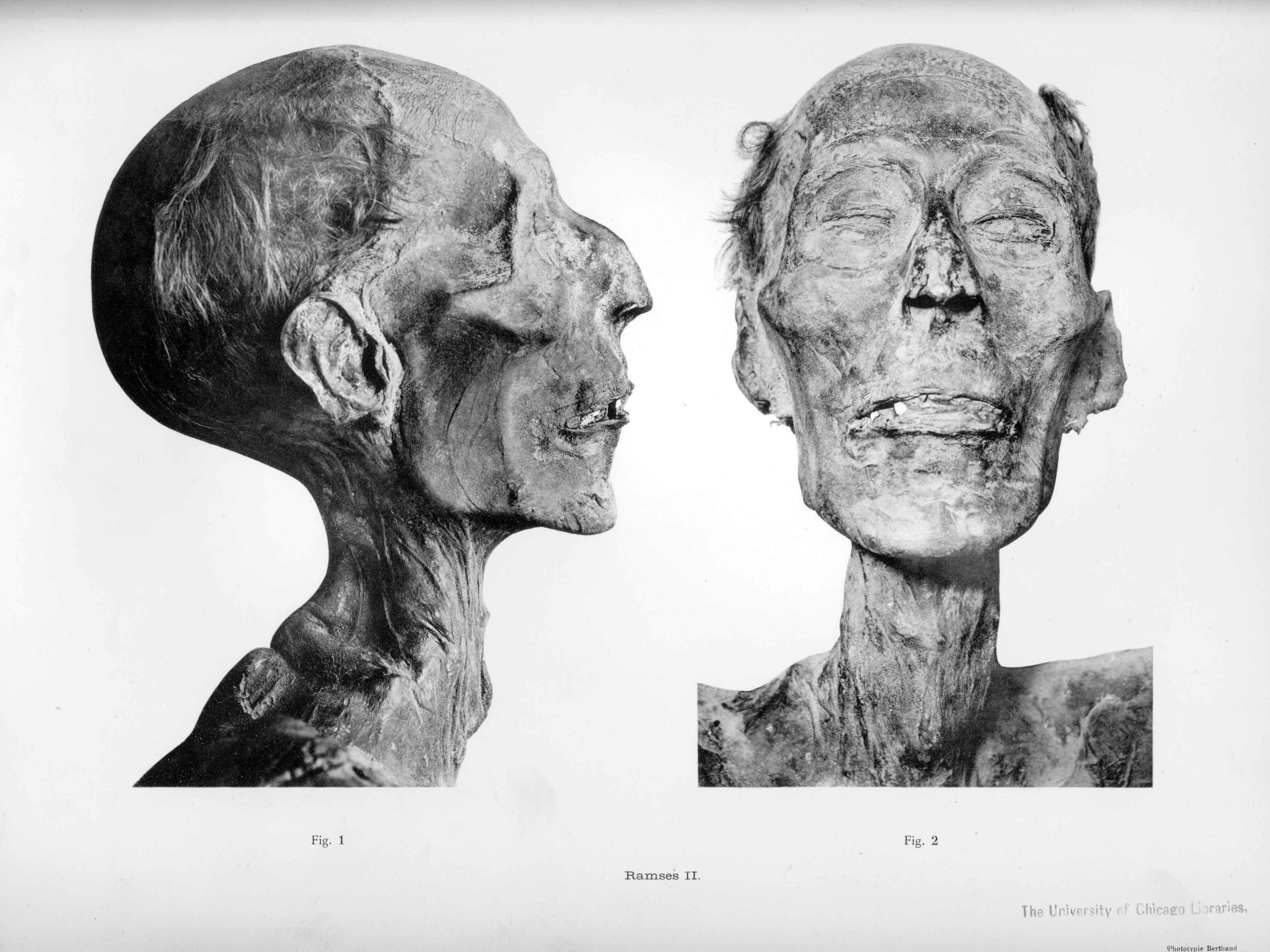
Profile and frontal views of Ramesses II's mummy

The pharaoh's mummy reveals an aquiline nose and strong jaw. It stands at about 1.7 metres (5 ft 7 in). Gaston Maspero, who first unwrapped the mummy of Ramesses II, writes, "on the temples there are a few sparse hairs, but at the poll the hair is quite thick, forming smooth, straight locks about five centimeters in length. White at the time of death, and possibly auburn during life, they have been dyed a light red by the spices (henna) used in embalming ... the moustache and beard are thin. ... The hairs are white, like those of the head and eyebrows ... the skin is of earthy brown, splotched with black ... the face of the mummy gives a fair idea of the face of the living king."

According to Egyptologist Frank J. Yurco, the mummy held features characteristic of northern Egyptians as Rameses II originated from the far north-eastern nome of Egypt rather than deriving from a southern regions as the case with the 12th dynasty, 17th dynasty and 18th dynasty. In his view, this reflected a wider continuum of admixture and physical variation exhibited across Egyptian royal dynasties.

In 1975, Maurice Bucaille, a French doctor, examined the mummy at the Cairo Museum and found it in poor condition. French President Valéry Giscard d'Estaing succeeded in convincing Egyptian authorities to send the mummy to France for treatment. In September 1976, it was greeted at Paris–Le Bourget Airport with full military honours befitting a king, then taken to a laboratory at the Musée de l'Homme. Persistent claims that the mummy was issued with a passport for the journey are incorrect, but may be based on the French word passeport being used to describe the extensive documentation required.

The mummy was forensically tested in 1976 by Pierre-Fernand Ceccaldi, the chief forensic scientist at the Criminal Identification Laboratory of Paris. Ceccaldi observed that the mummy had slightly wavy, red hair. From this trait combined with cranial features, he concluded that Ramesses II was of a "Berber type" and hence – according to Ceccaldi's analysis – fair-skinned. Subsequent microscopic inspection of the roots of Ramesses II's hair proved that the king's hair originally was red. Unlike Maspero, who had assumed the hair had been dyed by the mummification process, Bucaille confirmed that the red hair was natural, which suggests that he came from a family of redheads. This has more than just cosmetic significance: in ancient Egypt people with red hair were associated with the deity Set, the slayer of Osiris, and thus the enemy of Horus (Horus being the son of Osiris). In addition, it's noted that Ramesses had familiar connections to Set; the name of Ramesses II's father, Seti I, means "follower of Set", and Seti's father, Ramesses I, had served as the High Priest of Set under Amenhotep III. Cheikh Anta Diop disputed the results of the study, arguing that the structure of hair morphology cannot determine the ethnicity of a mummy and that a comparative study should have featured Nubians in Upper Egypt before a conclusive judgement was reached.

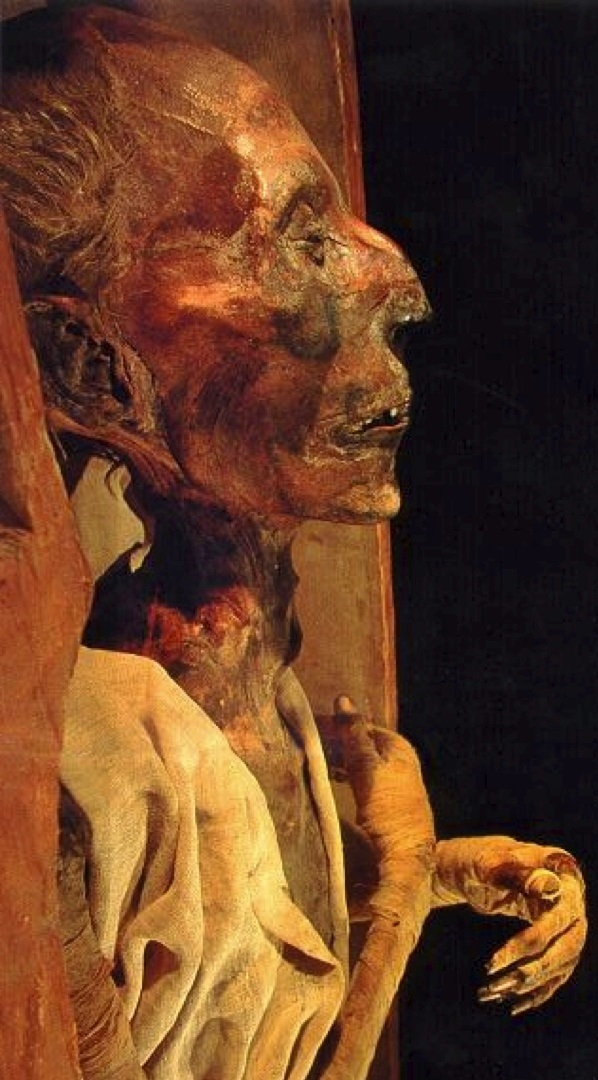
Mummy of Ramesses II in 2015

In 2006, French police arrested a man who tried to sell several tufts of Ramesses' hair on the Internet. Jean-Michel Diebolt said he had got the relics from his late father, who had been on the analysis team in the 1970s. They were returned to Egypt the following year. Ramesses II's arthritis is believed to have made him walk with a hunched back for the last decades of his life. A 2004 study excluded ankylosing spondylitis as a possible cause and proposed diffuse idiopathic skeletal hyperostosis as a possible alternative, which was confirmed by more recent work. A significant hole in the pharaoh's mandible was detected. Researchers observed "an abscess by his teeth (which) was serious enough to have caused death by infection, although this cannot be determined with certainty".

After being irradiated in an attempt to eliminate fungi and insects, the mummy was returned from Paris to Egypt in May 1977.

In April 2021, his mummy was moved from the old Egyptian Museum to the new National Museum of Egyptian Civilization along with those of 17 other kings and 4 queens in an event termed the Pharaohs' Golden Parade.

=== Burial of wives and relatives ===
==== Tomb of Nefertari ====
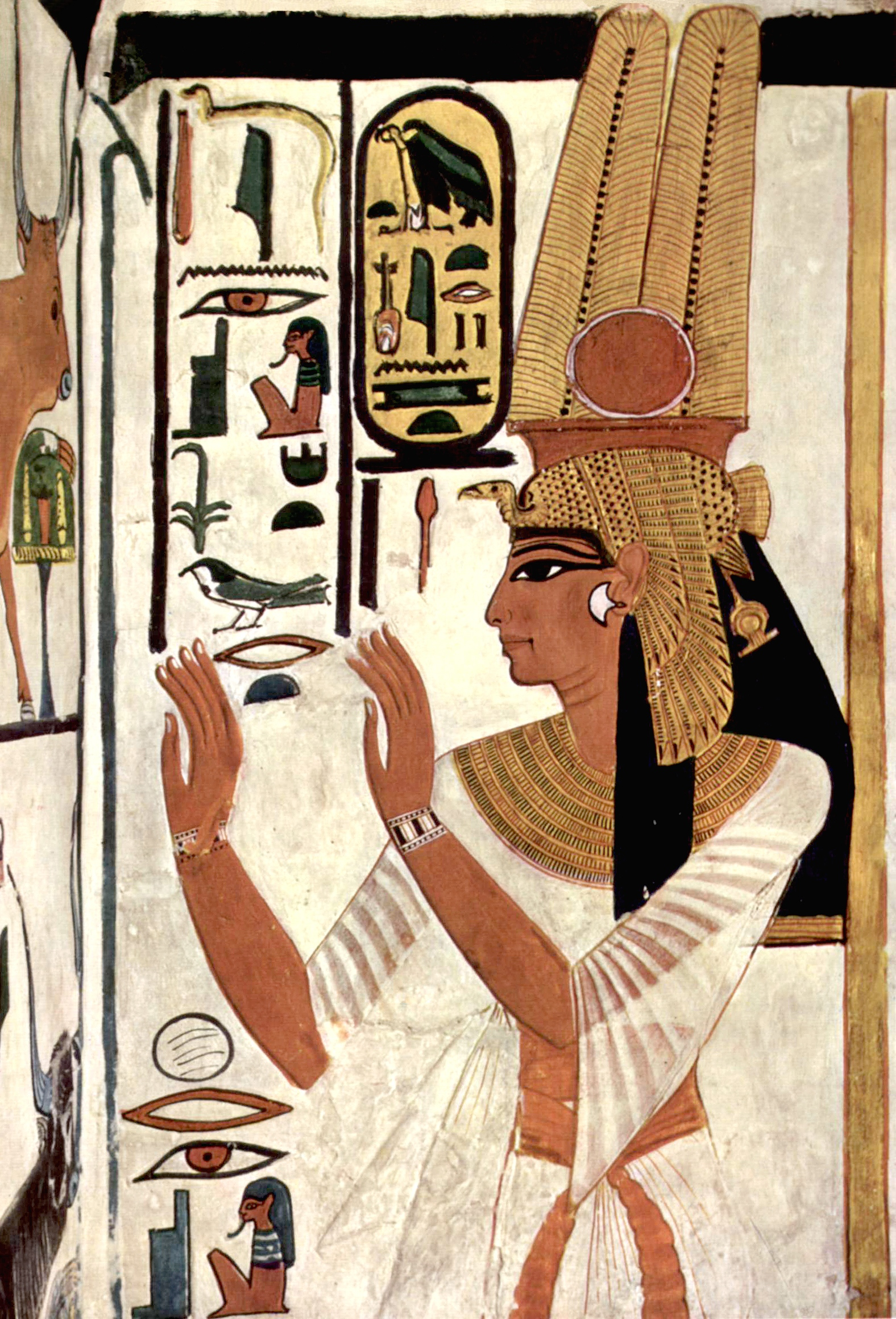
Tomb wall depicting Nefertari

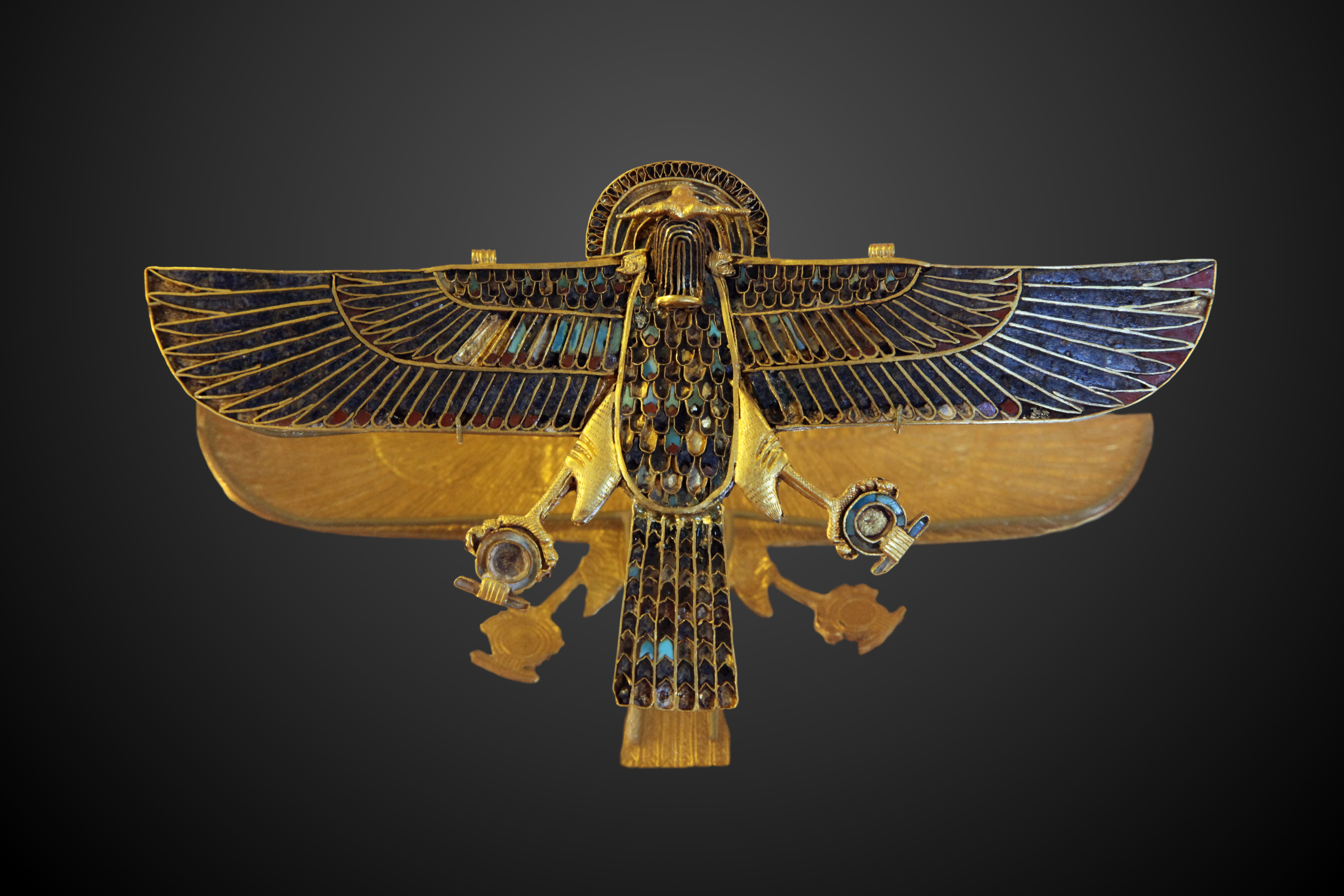
A ram headed amulet dating to c. 1254 BC during the reign of Ramesses II found in the Serapeum of Saqqara

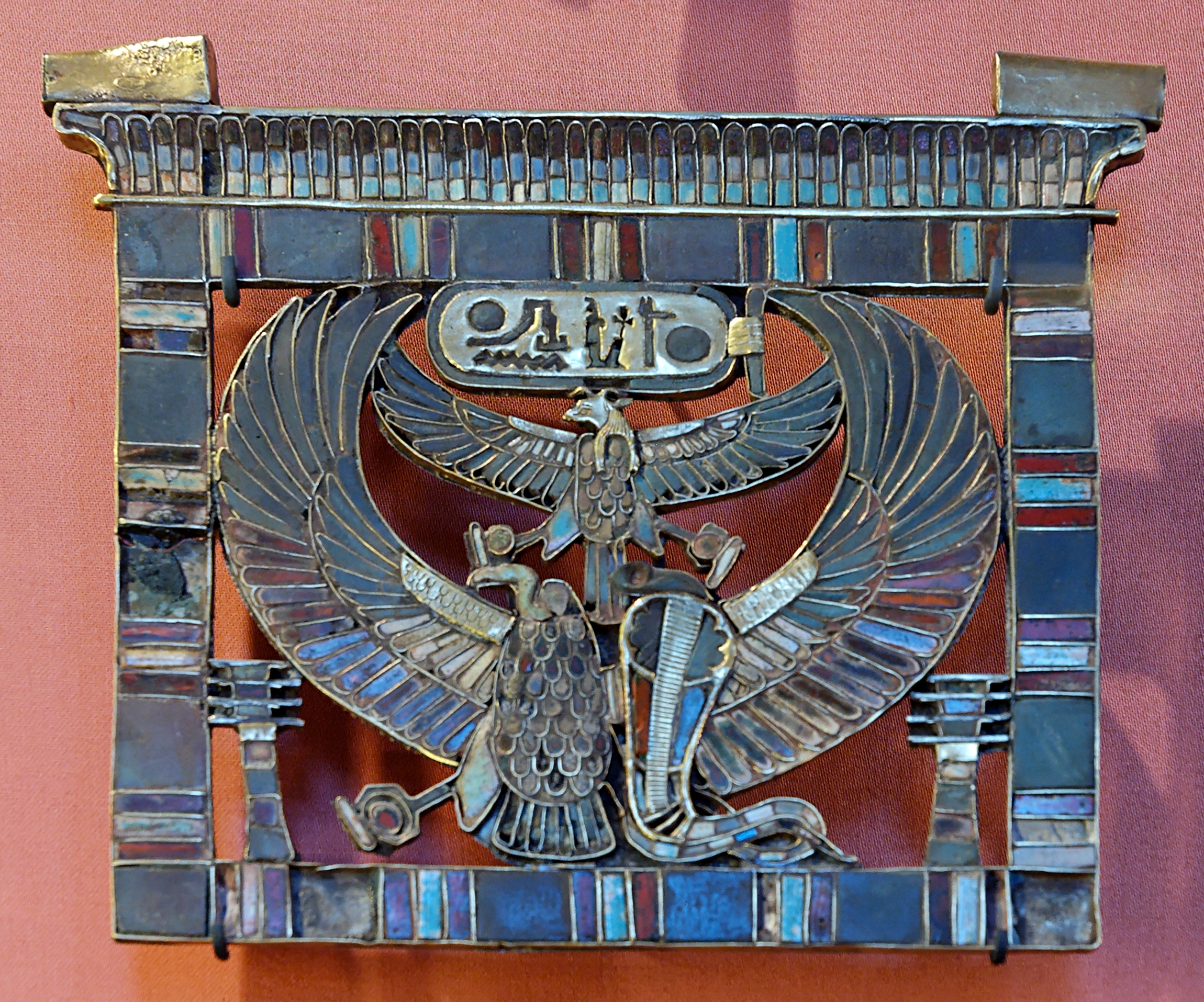
Gold, cloisonné, glass and turquoise pectoral bearing the cartouche or royal name of Ramesses II

The tomb of the most important consort of Ramesses was discovered by Ernesto Schiaparelli in 1904. Although it had been looted in ancient times, the tomb of Nefertari is extremely important, because its magnificent wall-painting decoration is regarded as one of the greatest achievements of ancient Egyptian art. A flight of steps cut out of the rock gives access to the antechamber, which is decorated with paintings based on chapter seventeen of the Book of the Dead. The astronomical ceiling represents the heavens and is painted in dark blue, with a myriad of golden five-pointed stars. The east wall of the antechamber is interrupted by a large opening flanked by representation of Osiris at the left and Anubis at the right; this in turn leads to the side chamber, decorated with offering-scenes, preceded by a vestibule in which the paintings portray Nefertari presented to the deities, who welcome her. On the north wall of the antechamber is the stairway down to the burial-chamber, a vast quadrangular room covering a surface-area of about 90 square metres (970 sq ft), its astronomical ceiling supported by four pillars, entirely decorated. Originally, the queen's red granite sarcophagus lay in the middle of this chamber. According to religious doctrines of the time, it was in this chamber, which the ancient Egyptians called the Golden Hall, that the regeneration of the deceased took place. This decorative pictogram of the walls in the burial-chamber drew inspiration from chapters 144 and 146 of the Book of the Dead: in the left half of the chamber, there are passages from chapter 144 concerning the gates and doors of the kingdom of Osiris, their guardians, and the magic formulas that had to be uttered by the deceased in order to go past the doors.

==== Tomb KV5 ====
In 1995, Professor Kent Weeks, head of the Theban Mapping Project, rediscovered Tomb KV5. It has proven to be the largest tomb in the Valley of the Kings, and originally contained the mummified remains of some of this king's estimated 52 sons. Approximately 150 corridors and tomb chambers have been located in this tomb as of 2006 and the tomb may contain as many as 200 corridors and chambers. It is believed that at least four of Ramesses's sons, including Meryatum, Sety, Amun-her-khepeshef (Ramesses's first-born son) and "the King's Principal Son of His Body, the Generalissimo Ramesses, justified" (i.e., deceased) were buried there from inscriptions, ostraca or canopic jars discovered in the tomb. Joyce Tyldesley writes that thus far

no intact burials have been discovered and there have been little substantial funeral debris: thousands of potsherds, faience ushabti figures, beads, amulets, fragments of Canopic jars, of wooden coffins ... but no intact sarcophagi, mummies or mummy cases, suggesting that much of the tomb may have been unused. Those burials which were made in KV5 were thoroughly looted in antiquity, leaving little or no remains.

== In literature and the arts ==
Ramesses is the basis for Percy Bysshe Shelley's poem "Ozymandias". Diodorus Siculus gives an inscription on the base of one of his sculptures as: "King of Kings am I, Osymandias. If anyone would know how great I am and where I lie, let him surpass one of my works." This is paraphrased in Shelley's poem.

The life of Ramesses II has inspired many fictional representations, including the historical novels of the French writer Christian Jacq, the Ramsès series; the graphic novel Watchmen, in which the character of Adrian Veidt uses Ramesses II to form part of the inspiration for his alter-ego, Ozymandias; Norman Mailer's novel Ancient Evenings, which is largely concerned with the life of Ramesses II, though from the perspective of Egyptians living during the reign of Ramesses IX; and the Anne Rice book The Mummy, or Ramses the Damned (1989), in which Ramesses was the main character. In The Kane Chronicles Ramesses is an ancestor of the main characters Sadie and Carter Kane. Ramesses II is one of the characters in the video game Civilization V, as well as in additional downloadable content for its sequel, Civilization VI.

The East Village underground rock band The Fugs released their song "Ramses II Is Dead, My Love" on their 1968 album It Crawled into My Hand, Honest.

Ramesses II is a main character in the fiction book The Heretic Queen by Michelle Moran, published in 2008. It is a novel about the love story and beginning years of the marriage of Pharaoh Ramesses and Queen Nefertari, during the time Ramesses is trying to decide who will be queen between his two wives, Nefertari and Iset. Nefertari is the daughter and orphan of Queen Mutnodjmet and General Nakhtmin, niece of Queen Nefertiti and Pharaoh Ankhenaten. The book is told from the perspective of Nefertari and is fiction, but deals with many historical events during the beginning of Ramesses' reign and many historical people, giving readers a view of what life and these historical figures may have been like.

=== As the pharaoh of the Exodus ===
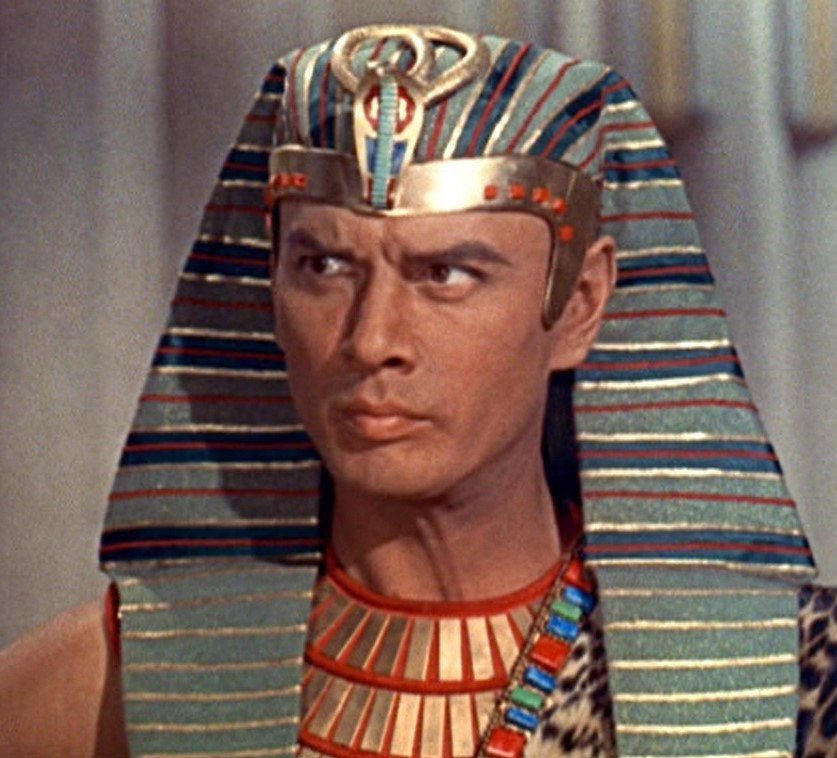
Yul Brynner in The Ten Commandments, 1956

Though scholars generally do not recognize the biblical portrayal of the Exodus as an actual historical event, various historical pharaohs have been proposed as the corresponding ruler at the time the story takes place.

Though Ramesses II is often portrayed in films and popular media as the Pharaoh of the Exodus, this is in dispute by historical evidence to the contrary from Egyptologists. Numerous biblical passages, including the single verse highlighted by proponents (Exodus 1:11), reveal that neither Ramesses II nor any of the Ramesside Dynasty pharaohs could have been the pharaoh during The Exodus. In 2023, Mostafa Waziry, who was then secretary-general of Egypt's Supreme Council of Antiquities, said that there is no archaeological or historical evidence in Egyptian antiquities that indicates Ramesses II is the Pharaoh of the Exodus, or any other Egyptian king, and added the Hyksos were the ruling power at the time. In addition, academic research points to a lack of archeological evidence of Israelite labor, and no references of foreign slave labor in state projects in Egyptian records of the time in the construction of Pi-Ramsses, or any other cities.

Jewish historian Lester L. Grabbe wrote in The Dawn of Israel: A History of Canaan in the Second Millennium BCE, that the association of Ramesses II with the Exodus and its associated stories in the Bible are because of his historical prominence. "Strangely, though, it is often proposed that the exodus and/or conquest of Canaan by the Israelites took place under his reign – apparently overlooking that he was one of the strongest of the pharaohs who had a firm hold of the whole region well into Syria and reigned for so much of the thirteenth century – and did not drown in the Red Sea. One cannot imagine an Egypt devastated by plagues, with a huge population leaving the country and an army destroyed in the wilderness near the Red Sea, as compatible with everything we know about this ruler." he wrote.

He is cast in this role in the 1944 novella The Tables of the Law by Thomas Mann. Although not a major character, Ramesses appears in Joan Grant's So Moses Was Born, a first-person account from Nebunefer, the brother of Ramose, which paints a picture of the life of Ramose from the death of Seti, replete with the power play, intrigue, and assassination plots of the historical record, and depicting the relationships with Bintanath, Tuya, Nefertari, and Moses.

In Cecil B. DeMille's 1956 film The Ten Commandments, Ramesses is played by Yul Brynner, portrayed as a vengeful tyrant as well as the main antagonist of the film, ever scornful of his father's preference for Moses over "the son of [his] body". The animated film The Prince of Egypt (1998) also features a depiction of Ramesses (voiced by Ralph Fiennes, for both the speaking and the singing), portrayed as Moses' adoptive brother, and ultimately as the film's villain with essentially the same motivations as in The Ten Commandments. Joel Edgerton played Ramesses in the 2014 film Exodus: Gods and Kings. Sérgio Marone plays Ramesses in the 2015–2016 Brazilian telenovela series Os Dez Mandamentos (English: 'The Ten Commandments').

In the 2013 miniseries The Bible, he is portrayed by Stewart Scudamore.

Ali Gomaa announced in 2020 that when there were tests run on the body of Ramesses, the reason of death was found to be suffocation. Egyptian archaeologist Zahi Hawass however states that it's not possible to know whether he died of drowning or not, as the lungs are not present in the mummy.

== Gallery ==
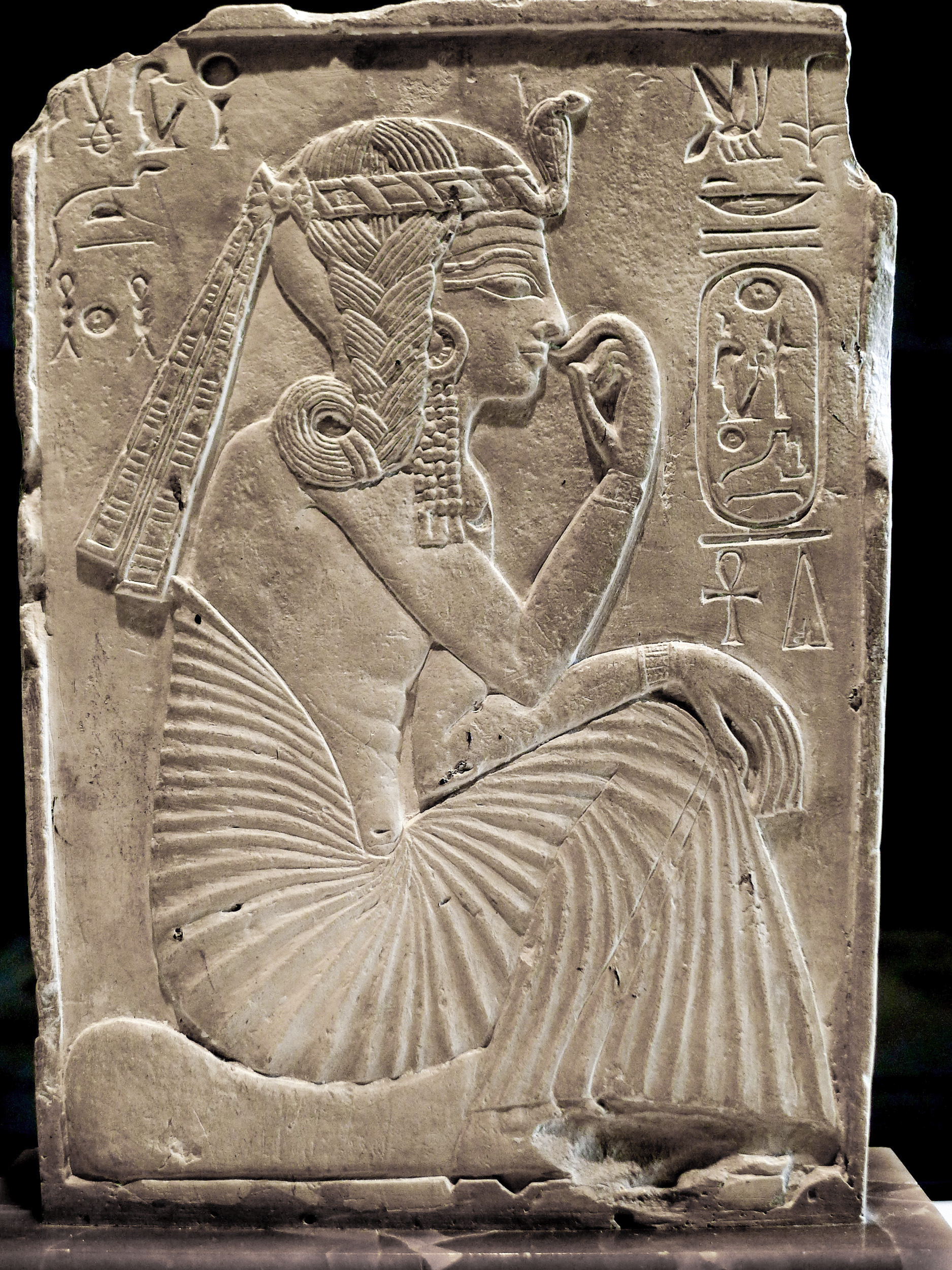
Ramesses as crown prince – 19th Dynasty – Musée du Louvre.

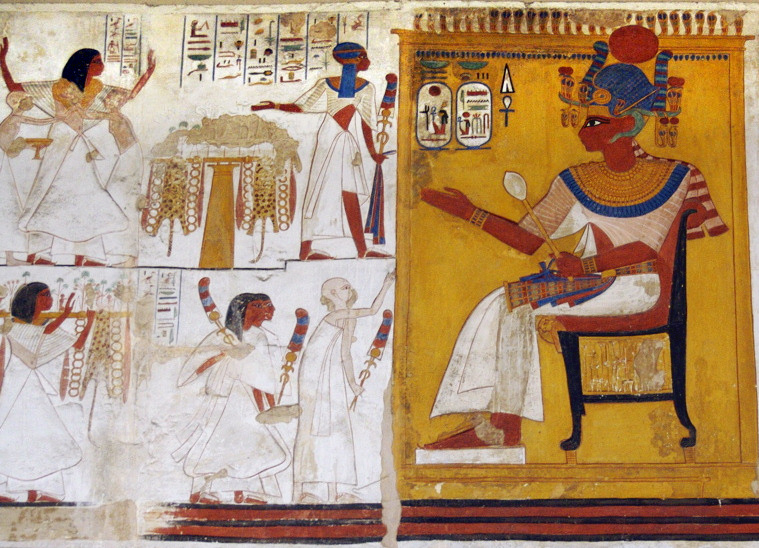
Relief of Ramesses II from the early years of his reign as it shows his regnal name as "Usermaatre" (he changed it to Usermaatre-Setepenre in the second regnal year), and his eldest son (first in the upper row) is still called by his birth name Amenherwenemef, instead of the better known Amenherkhopsef. British Museum

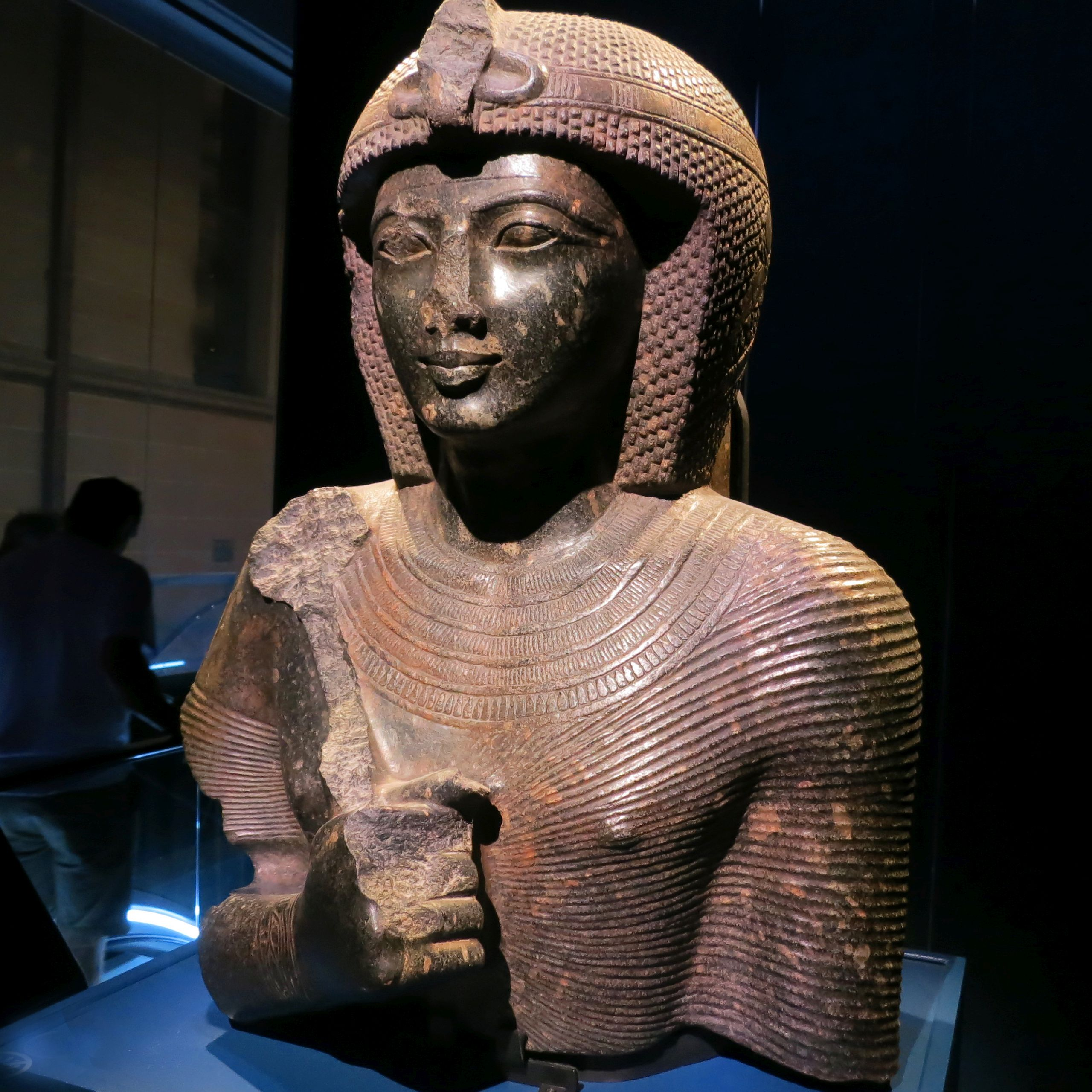
This statue shows a young Ramesses II holding the Heka Sceptre.

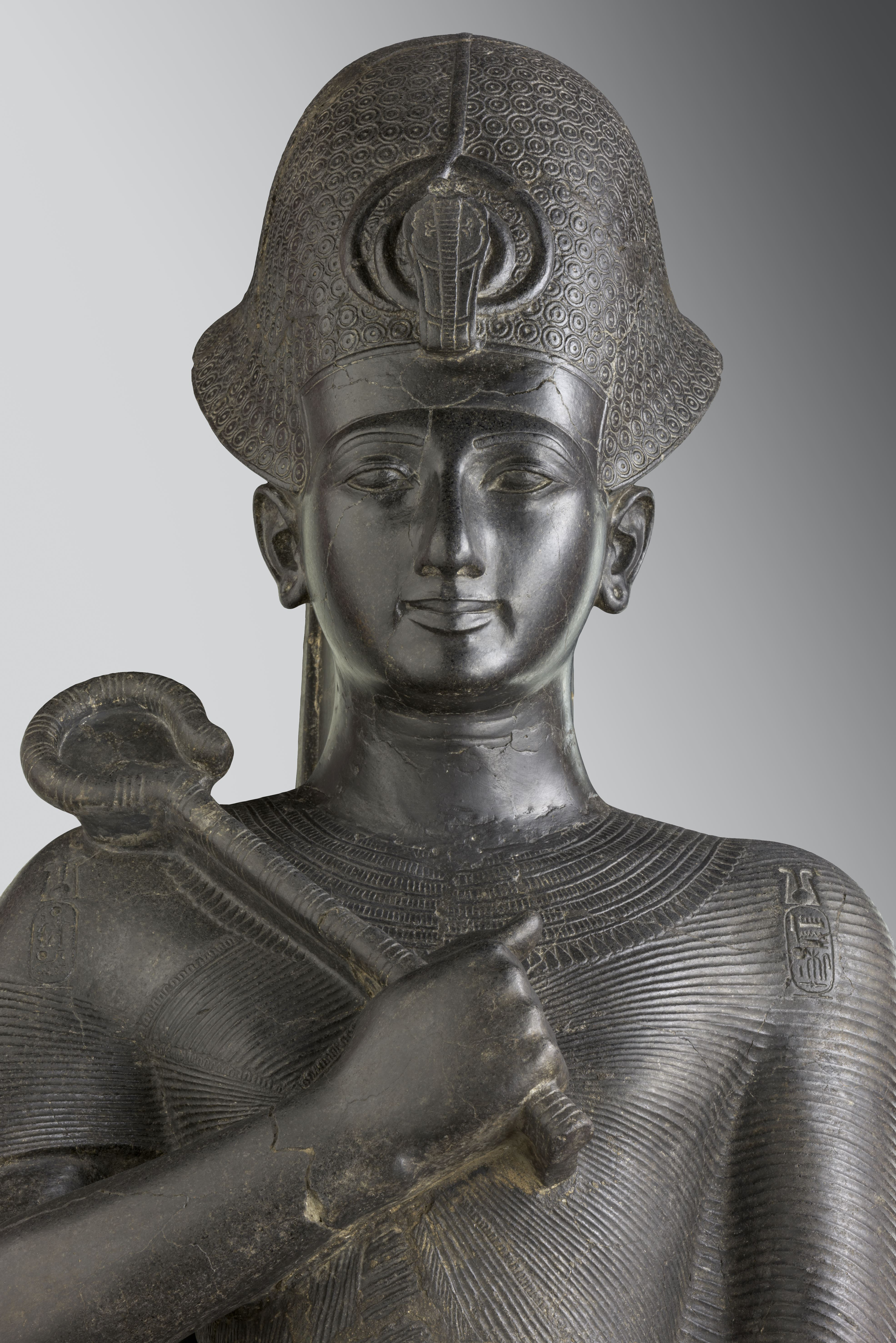
Ramesses II wearing the Khepresh, Museo Egizio (Turin)

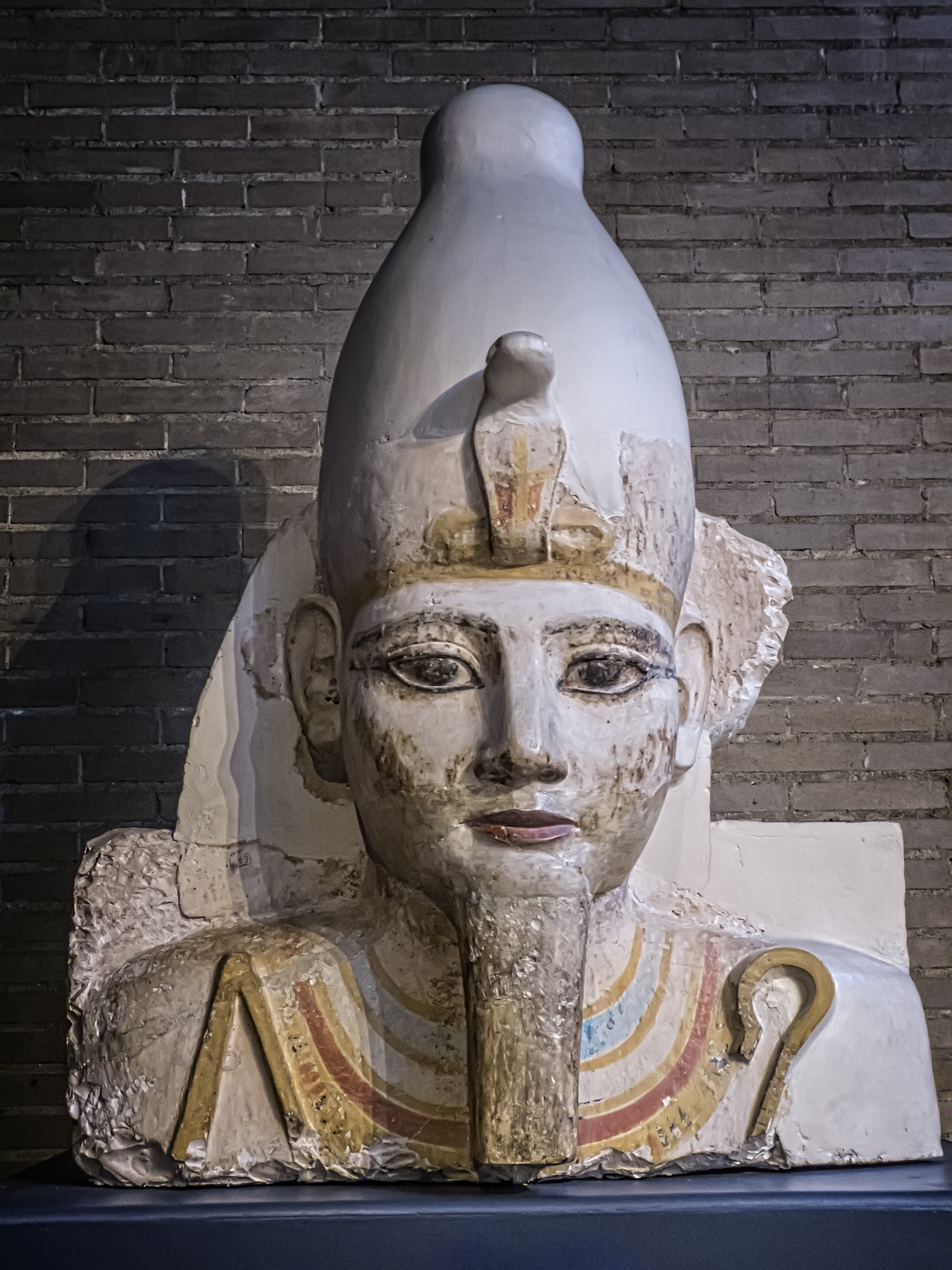
Painted colossal statue of Ramesses II from Abydos, now at the Penn Museum

Sitting statue of Ramesses II, Louvre

Statue of Ramesses II wearing the Pschent, Luxor Museum

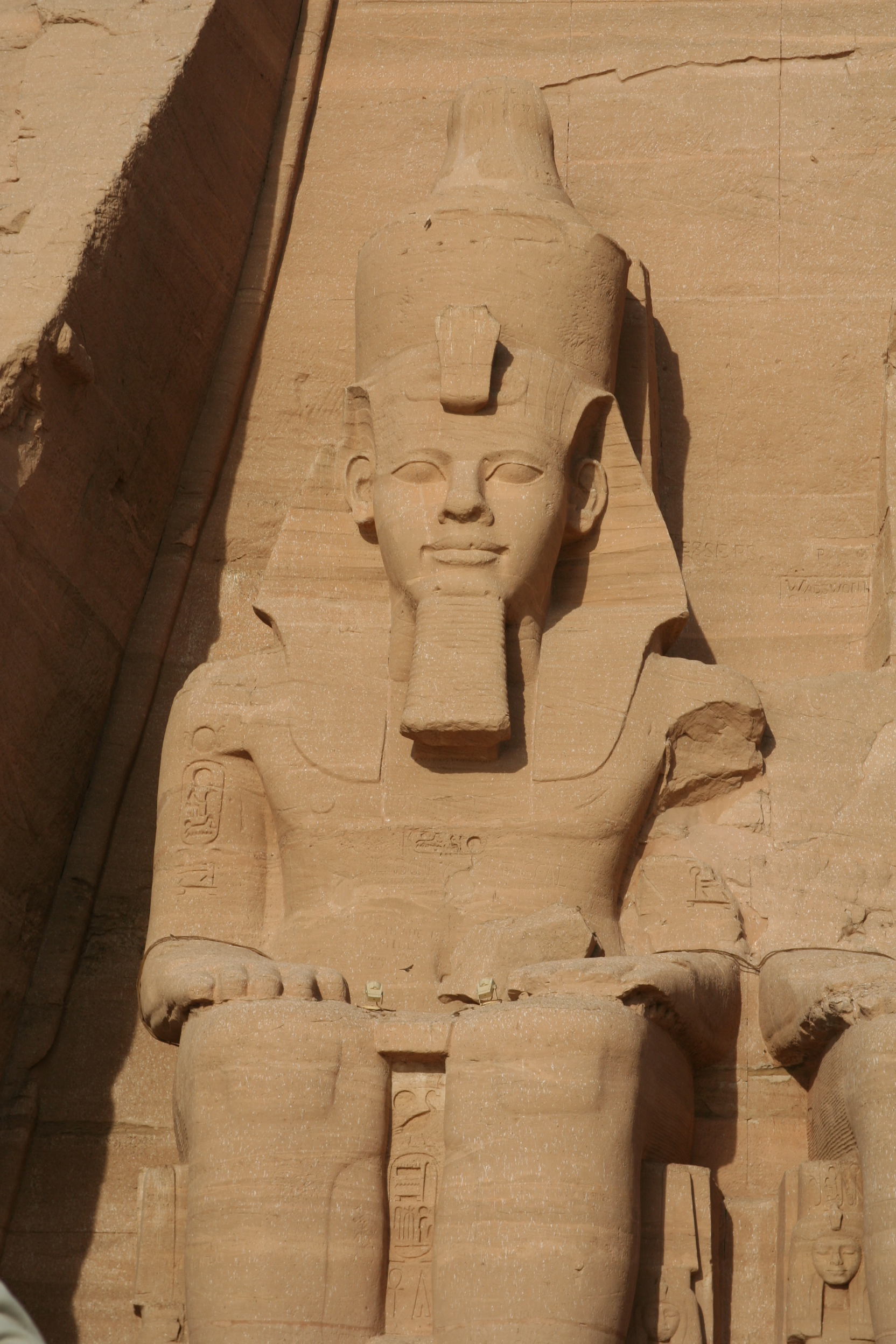
Statue at Abu Simbel of Ramesses II

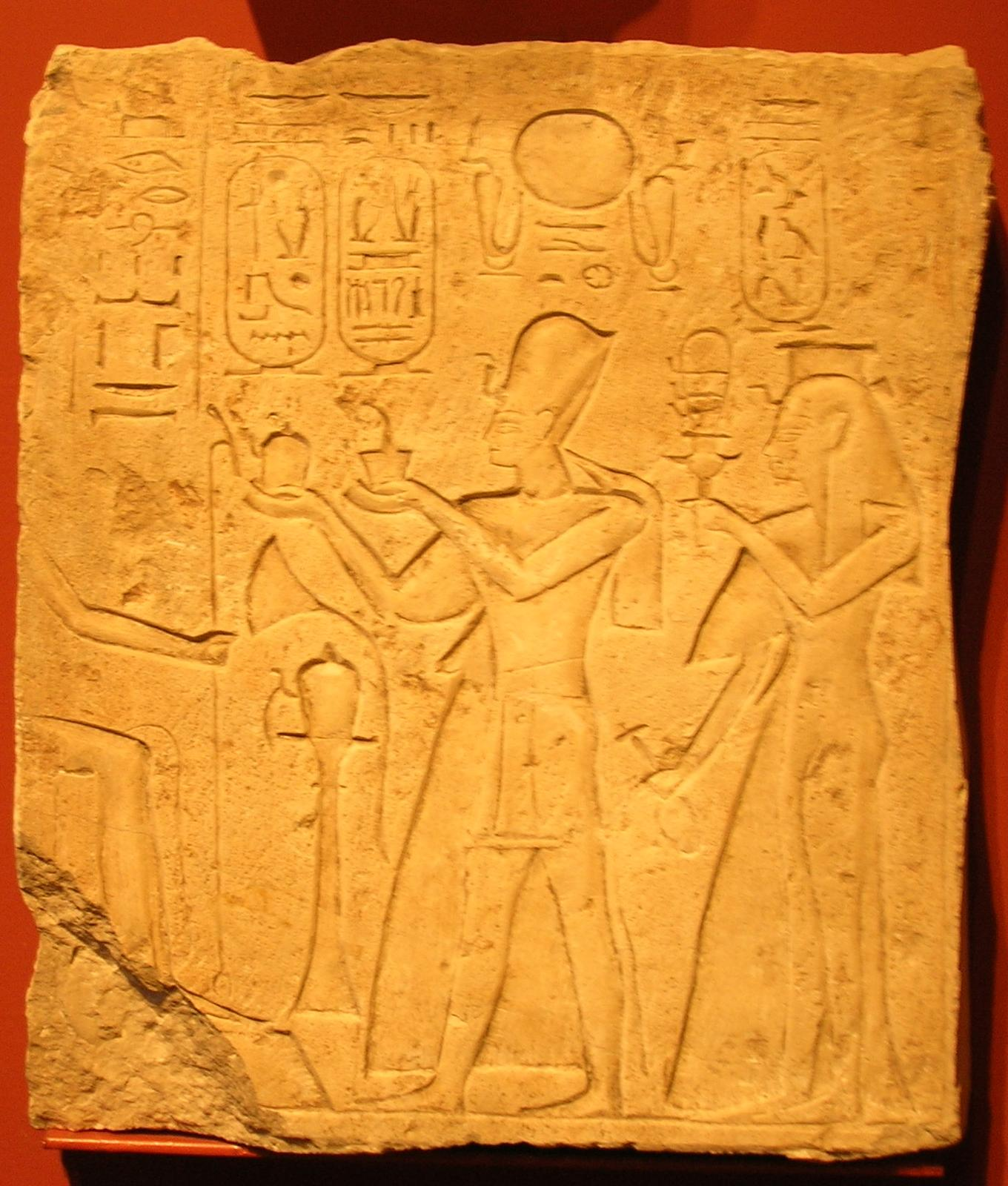
Relief of Ramesses II with his mother Tuya, Kunsthistorisches Museum

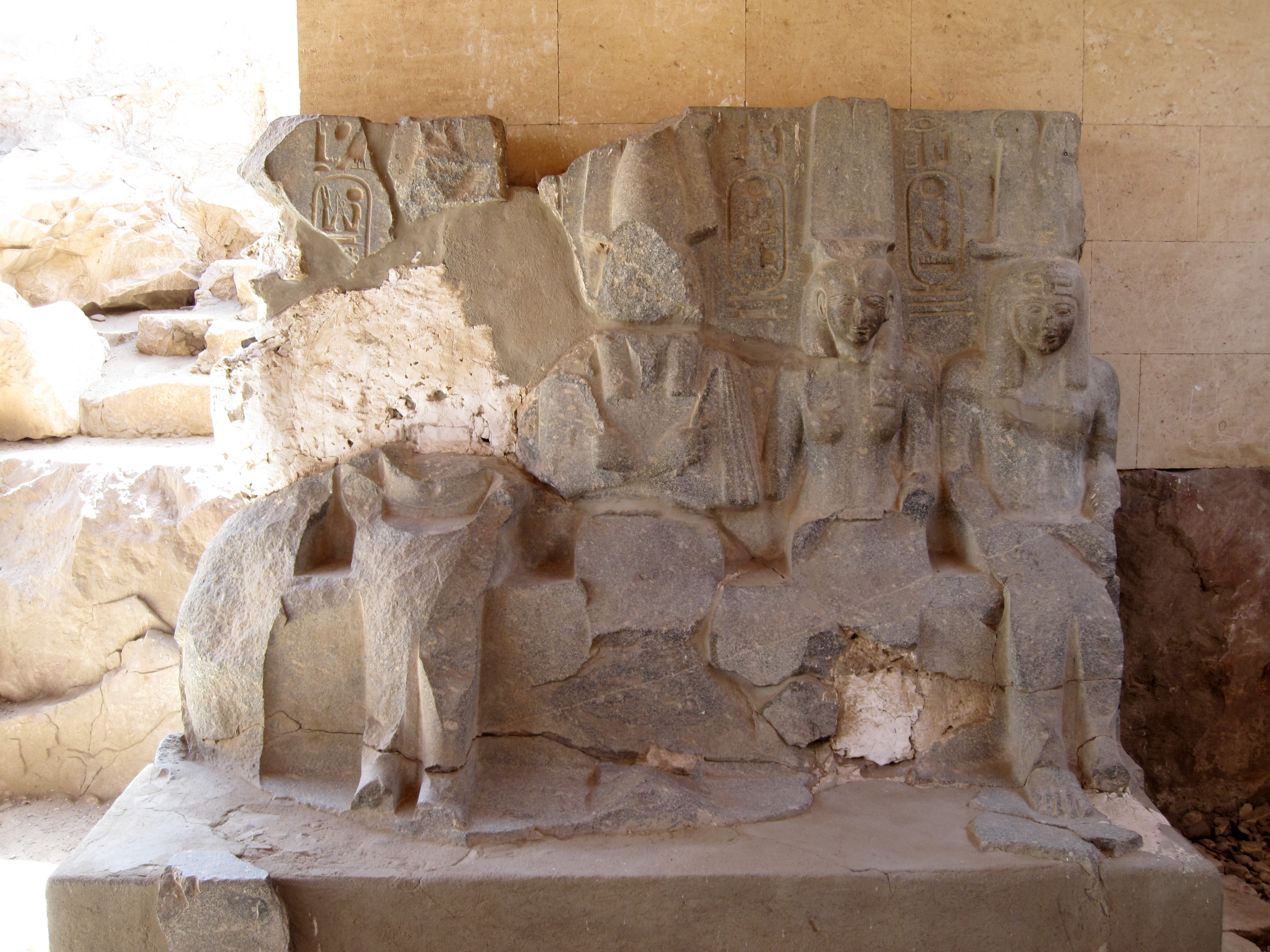
Seated statue of Ramesses II (far left), sitting with Horus, Osiris, Isis, and Ramesses's deified father Seti I. Abydos

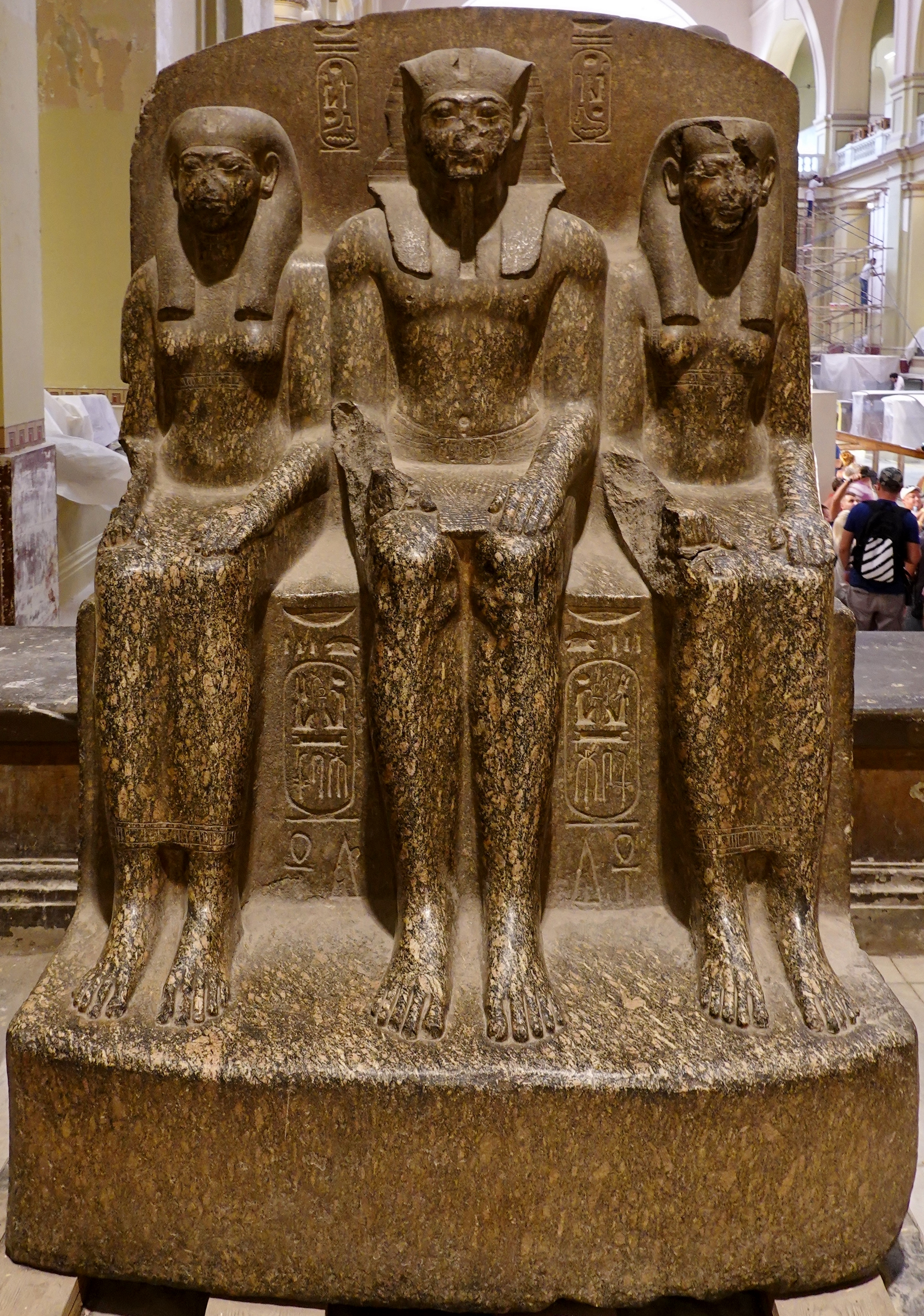
Seated statue of Ramesses II with Isis and Hathor with the features of his wives Nefertari and Isetnofret, respectively

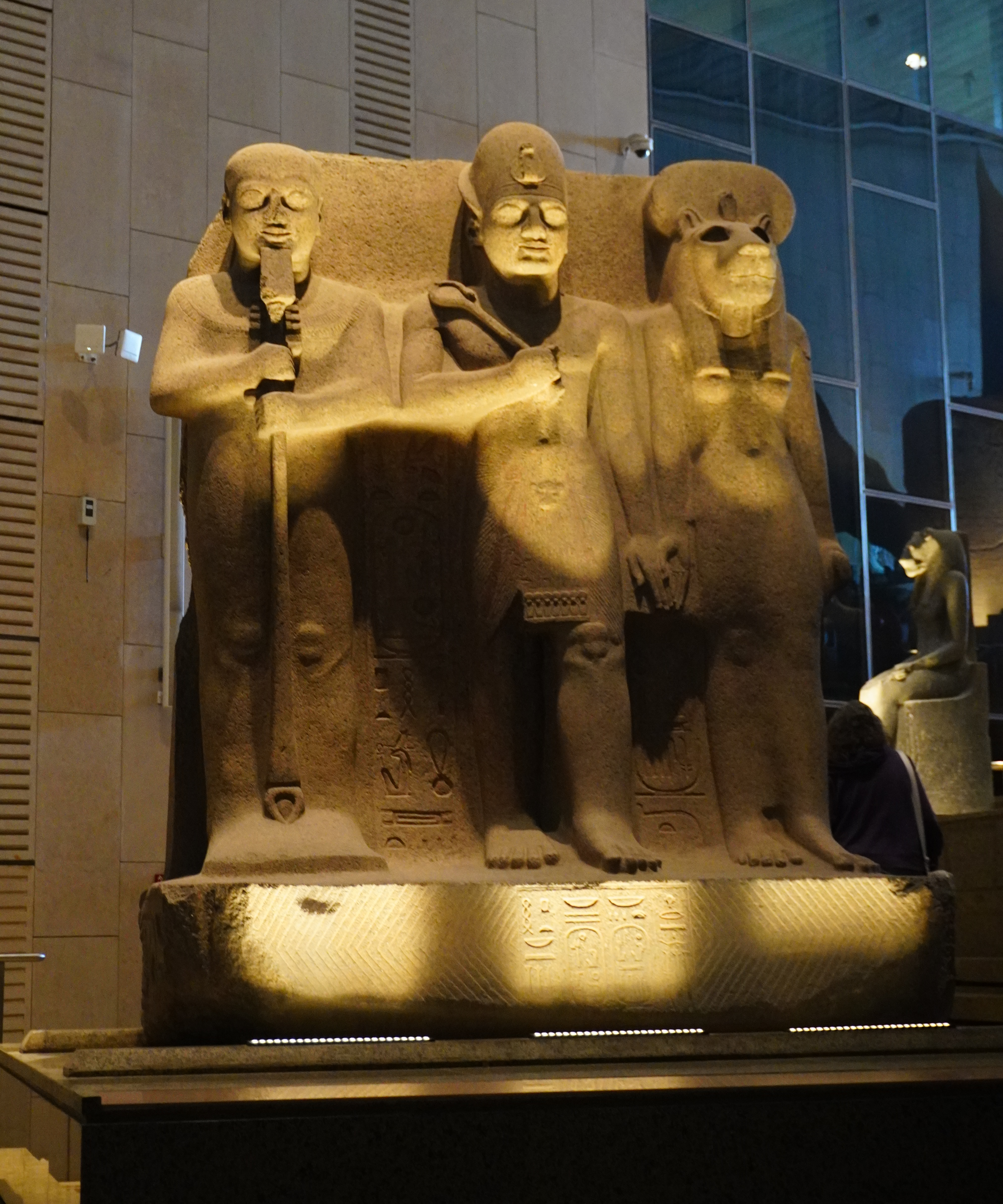
A statue of Ptah, Ramesses II, and Sekhmet, Grand Egyptian Museum

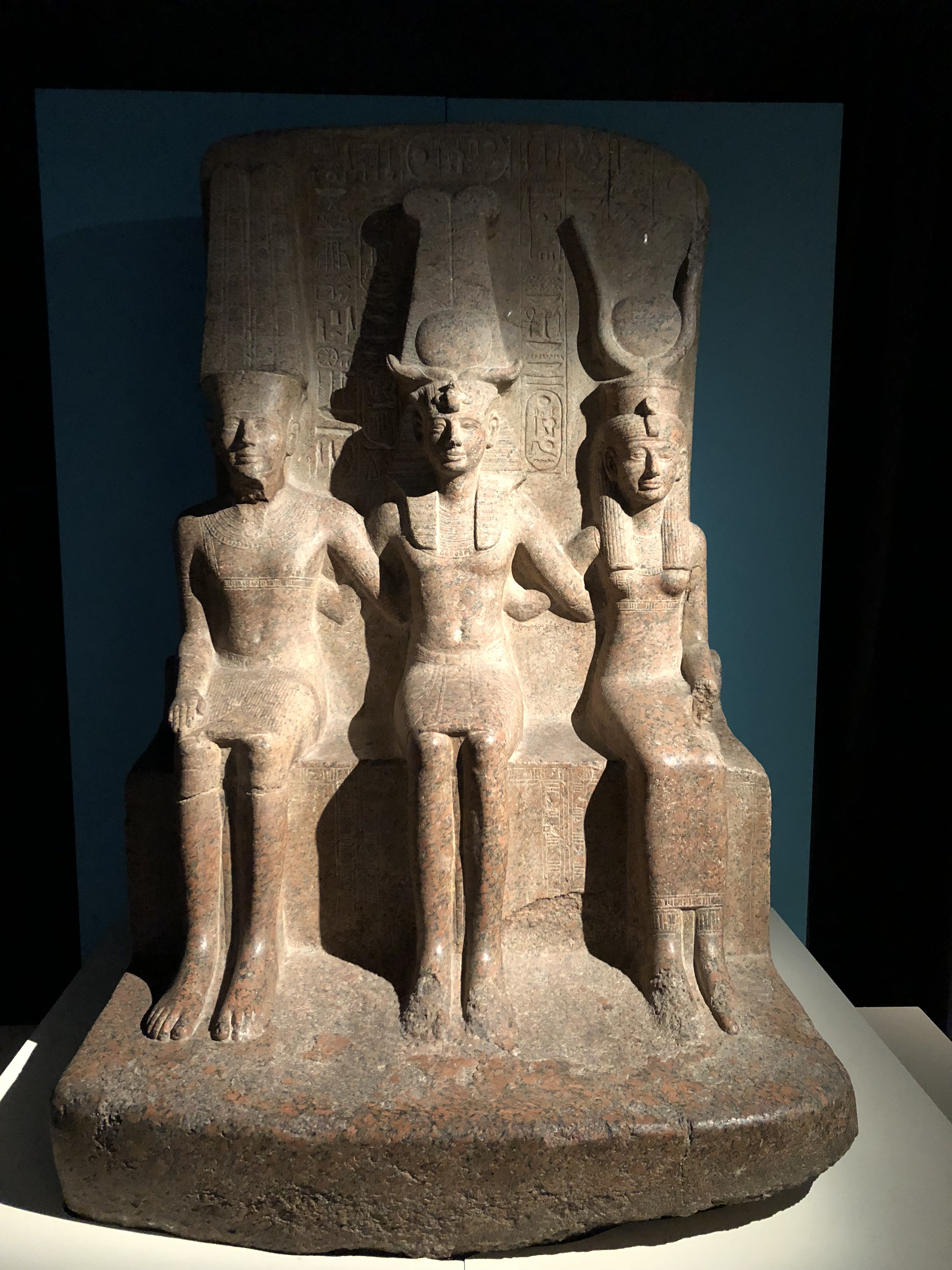
A statue of Amun, Ramesses II, and Mut, Museo Egizio

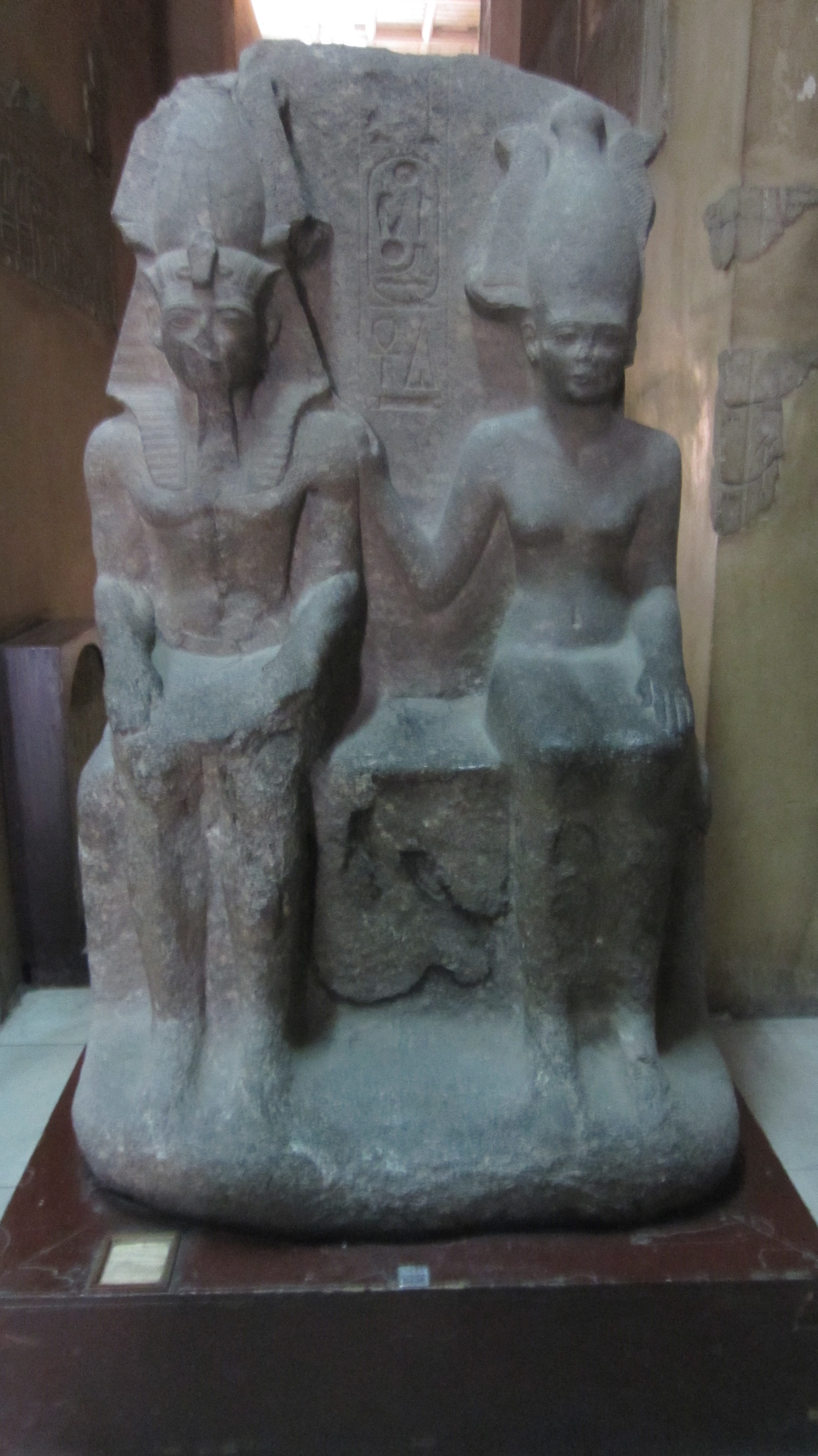
A statue of Anat and Ramesses II from Tanis, now in the Cairo Museum

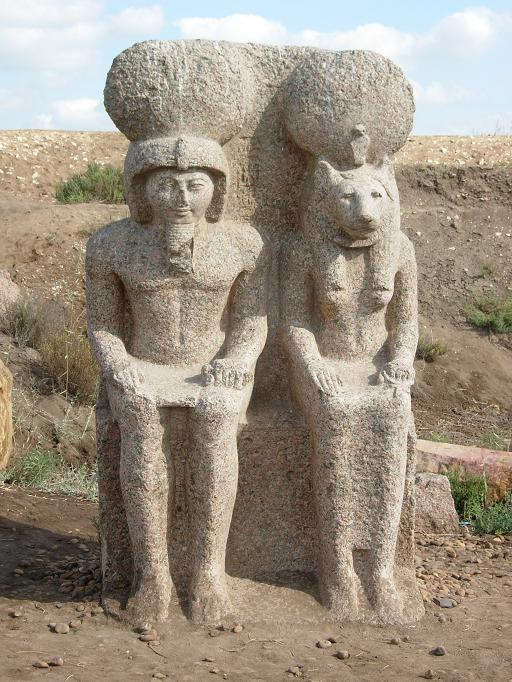
A statue of Wadjet and Ramesses II from Tanis, Cairo Museum

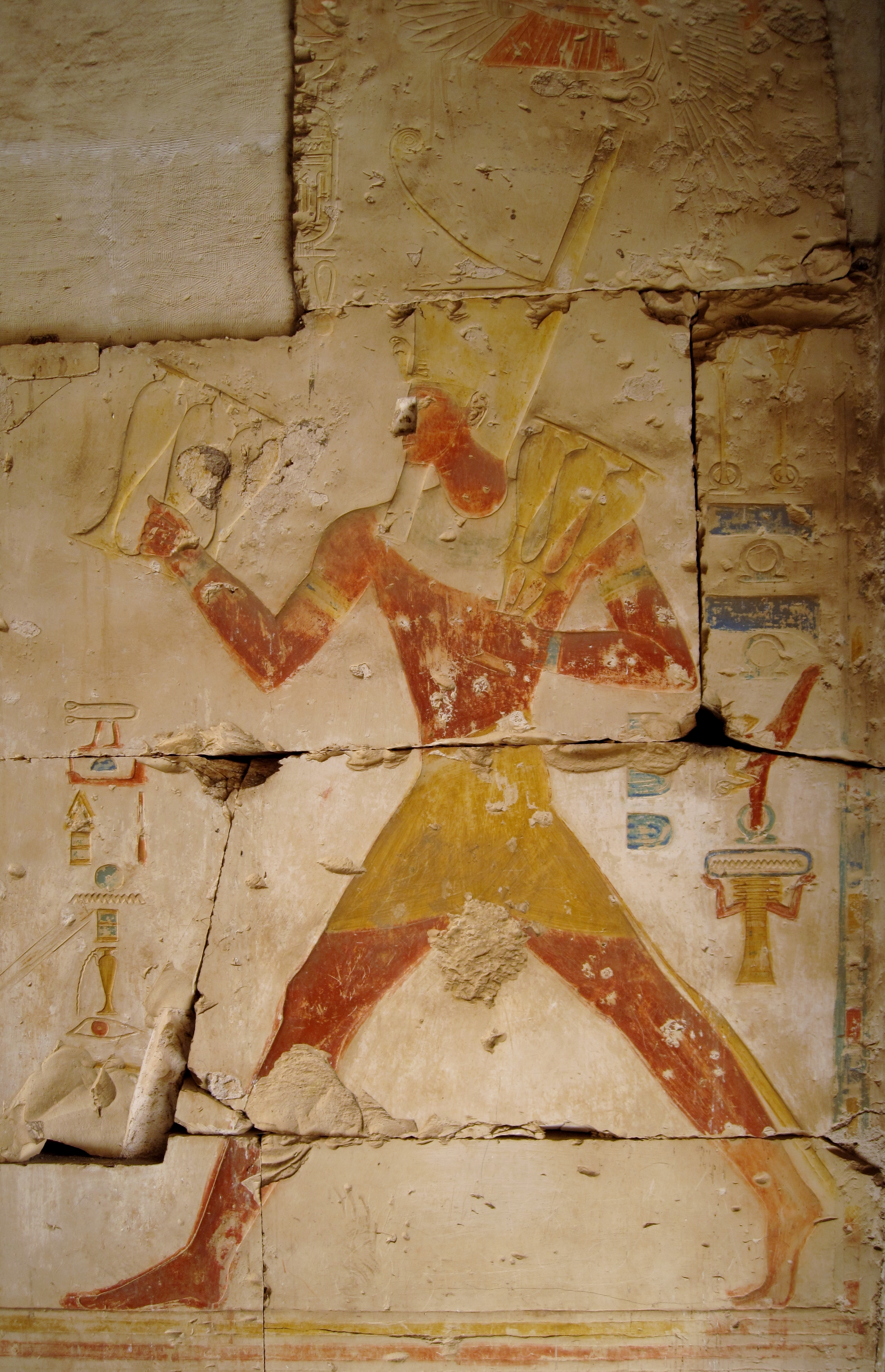
Ramesses II running for the Heb-Sed celebration

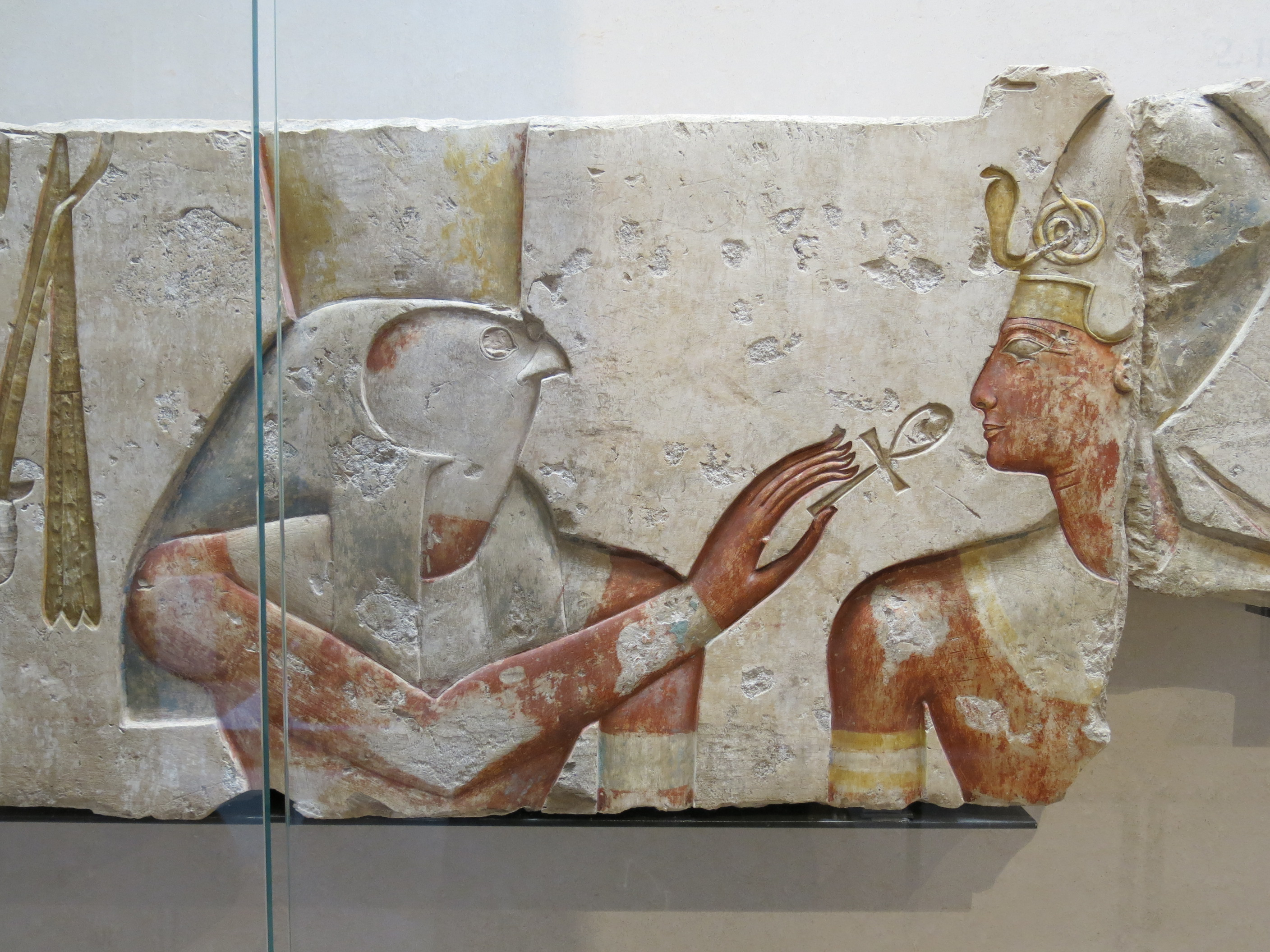
Relief of the god Horus offers life to Ramesses II

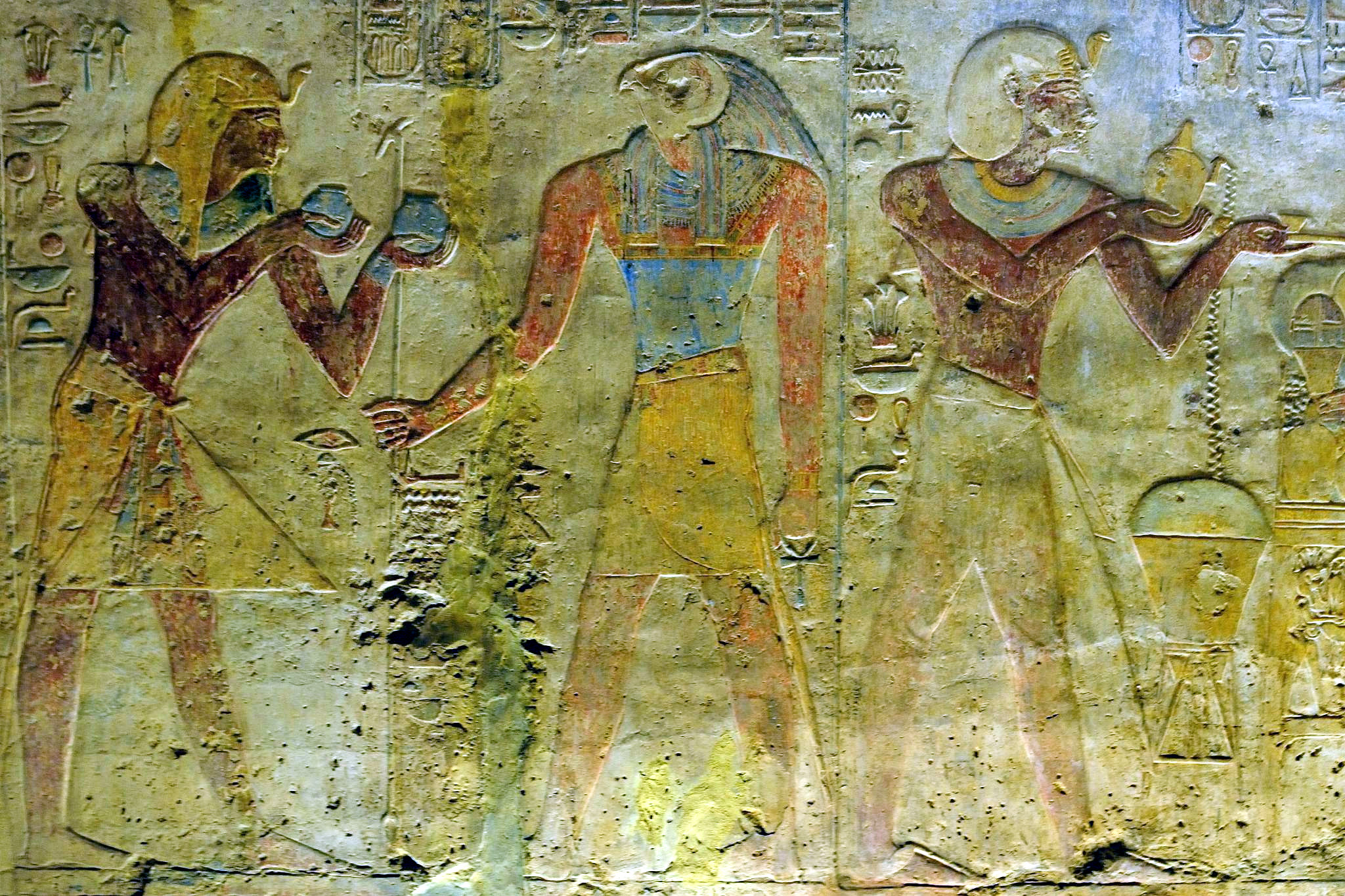
Wall relief of Ramesses II making an offering to Horus at the Temple of Beit el-Wali

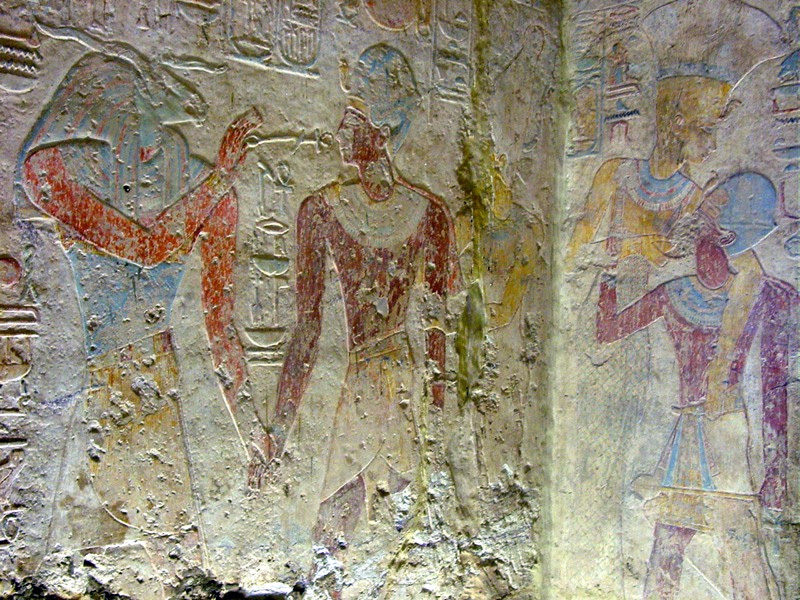
Relief of Ramesses II being suckled by Anuket and offered life by Khnum

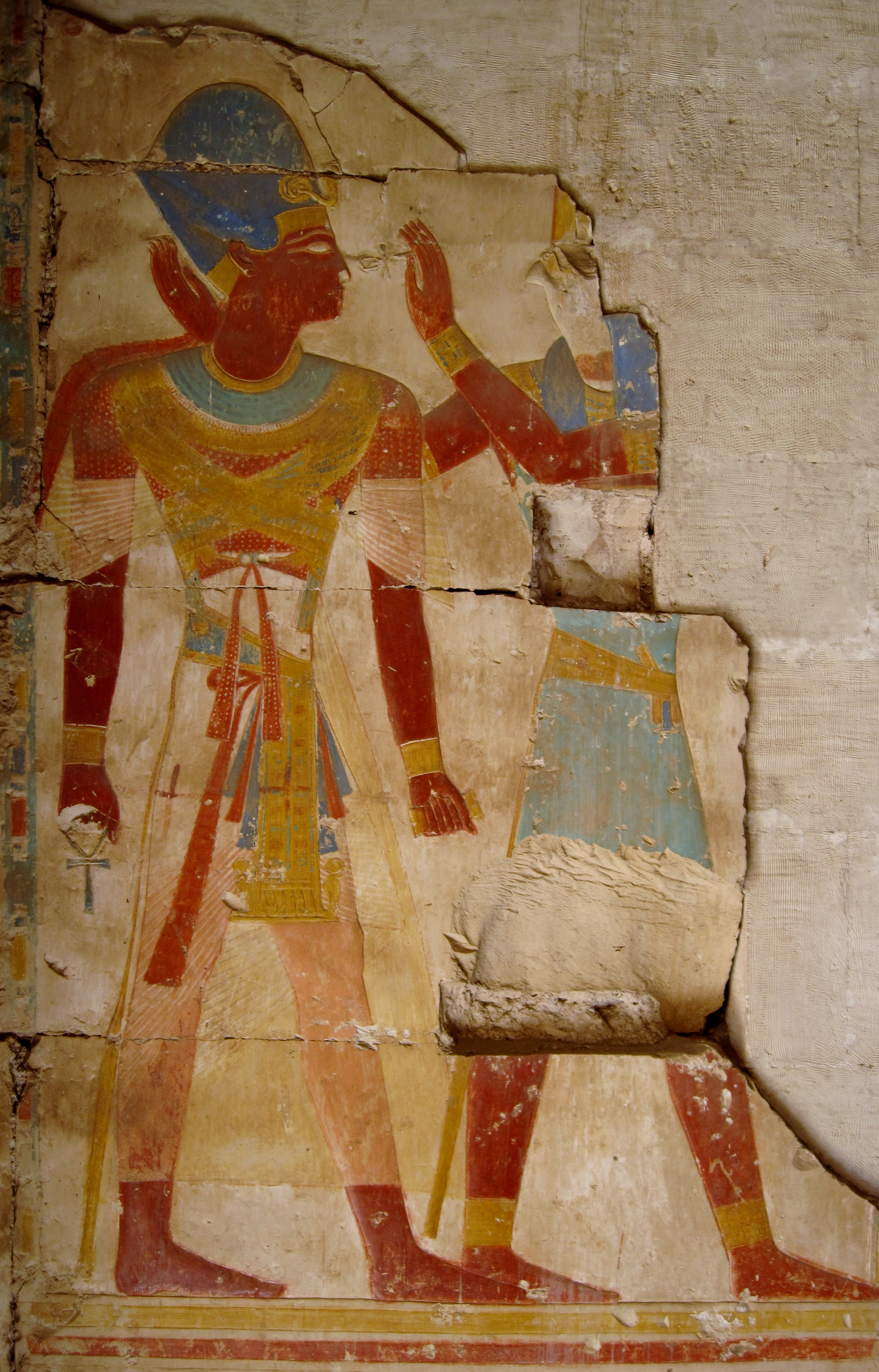
Fragment of a painted relief of Ramesses II being accompanied by Horus

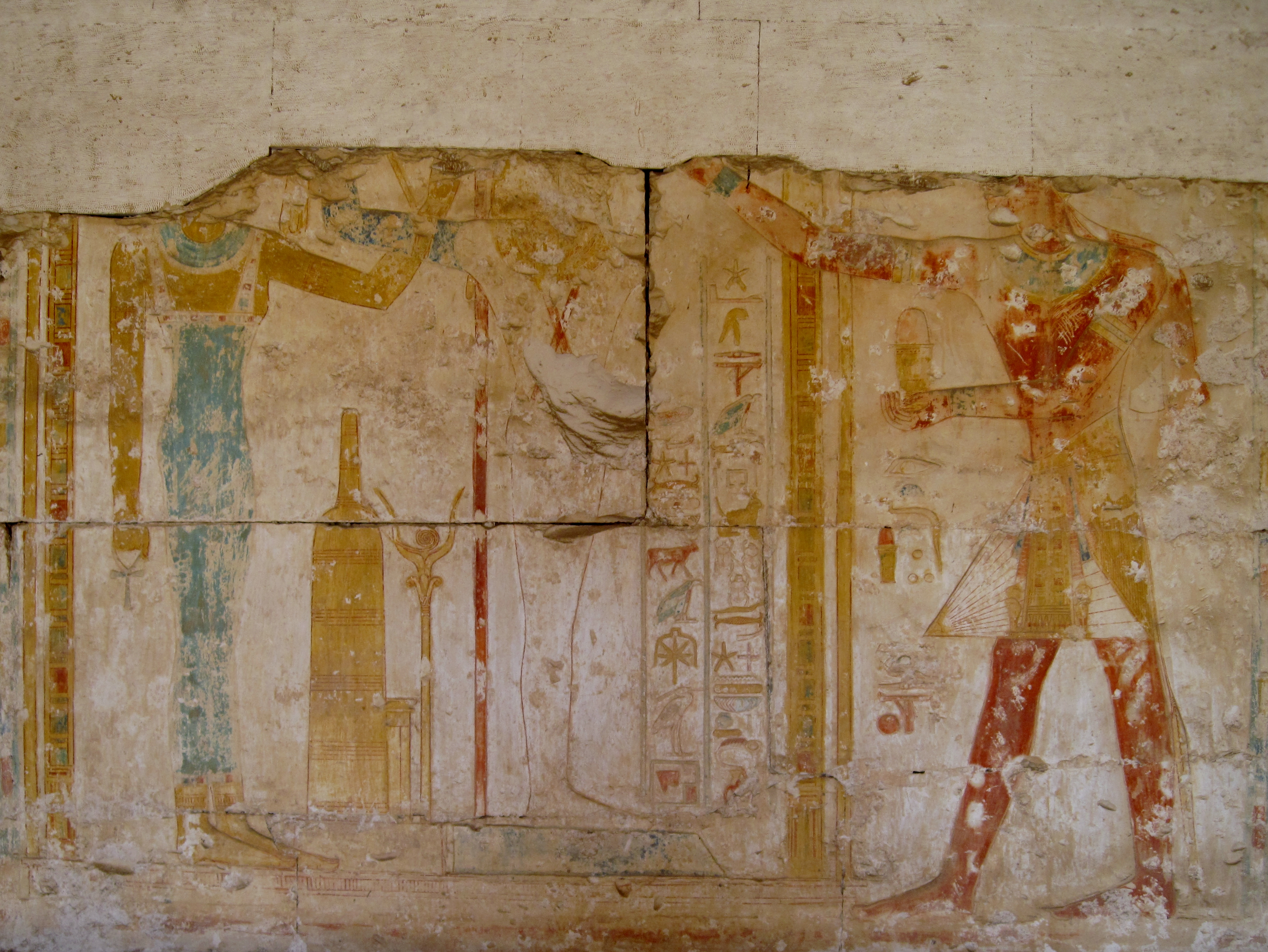
Fragment of a painted relief of Ramesses II giving offerings to Min

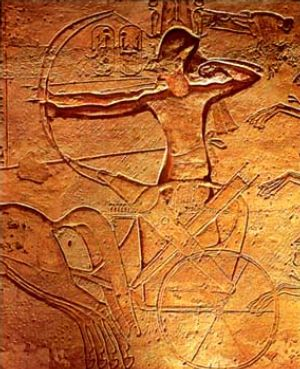
Ramesses II fighting in a chariot at the Battle of Kadesh with two archers, one with the reins tied around his waist to free both hands. Abu Simbel

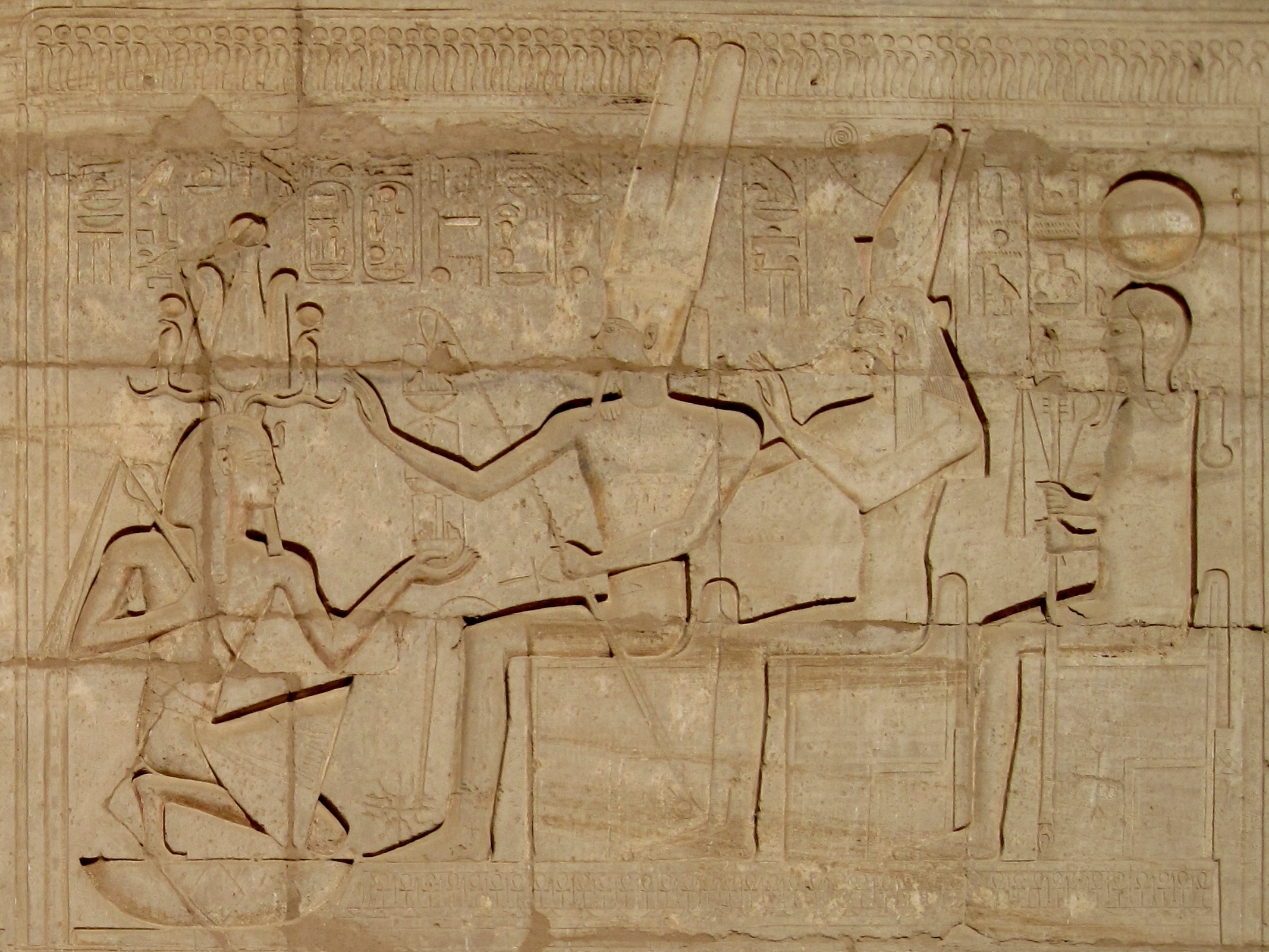
Relief of Ramesses II giving offerings to Amun, Mut and their son Khonsu. Ramesseum

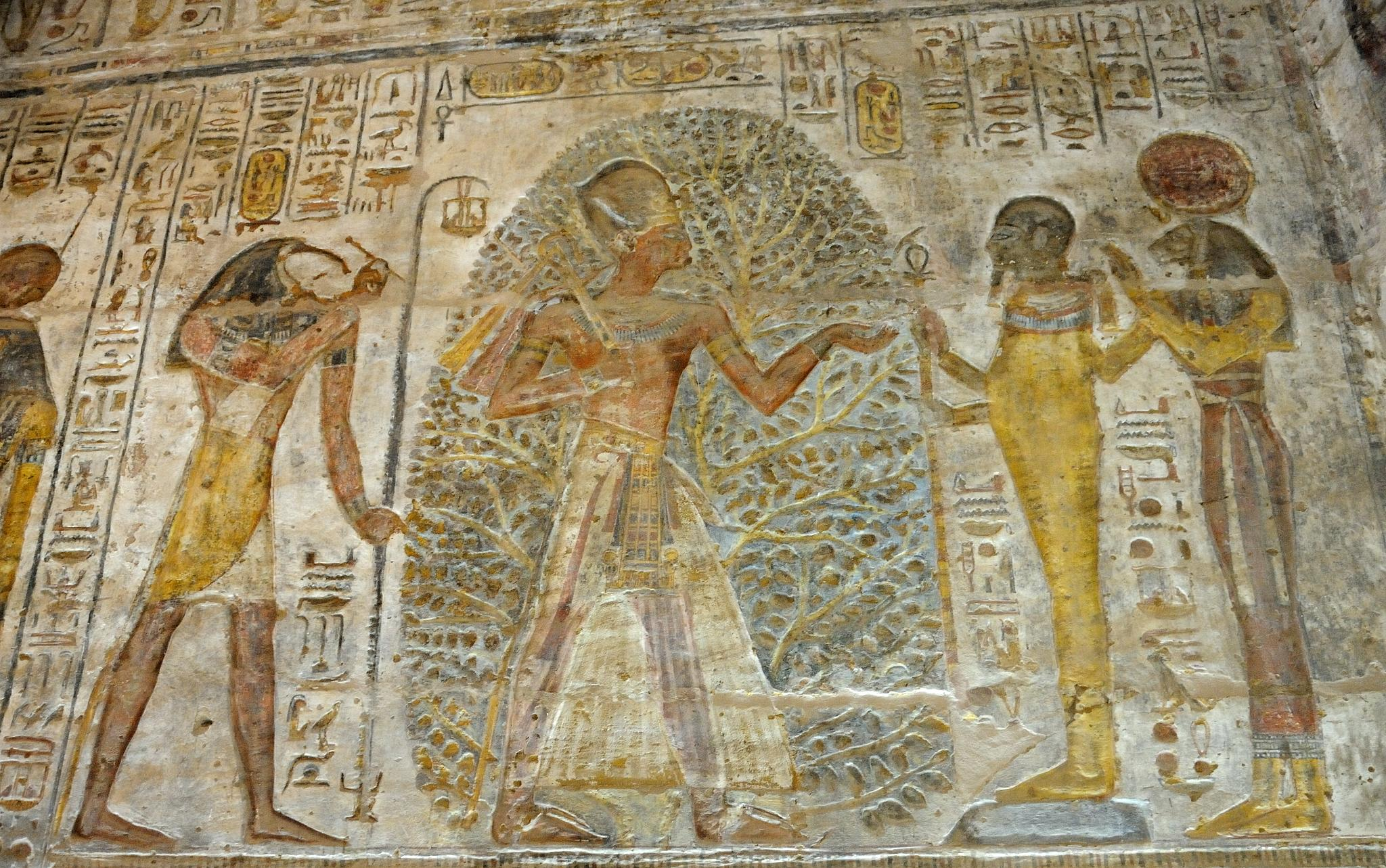
Relief of Ramesses II in the Temple of Derr

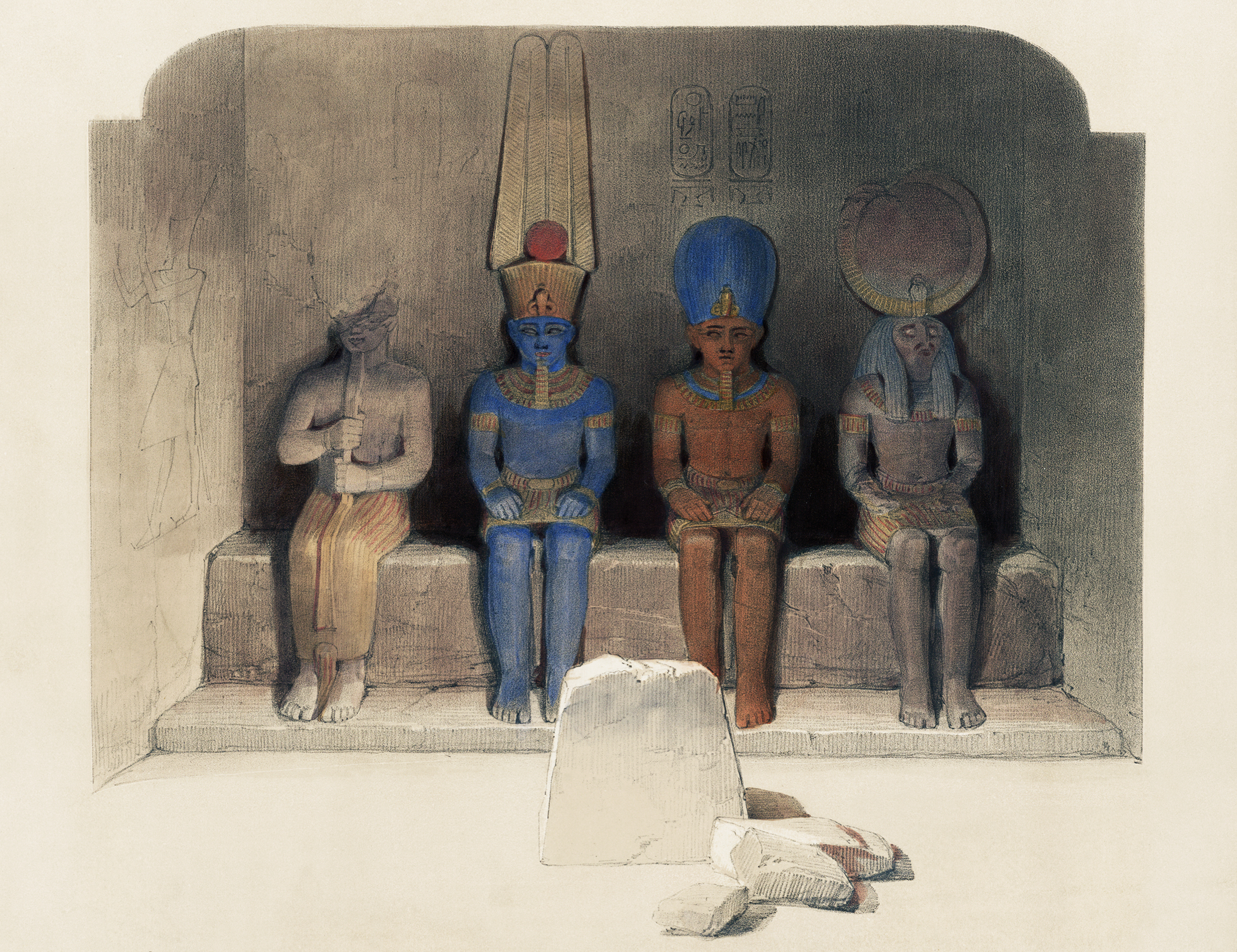
The inner sanctuary of the Great Temple of Abu Simbel, showing (from right to left) rock cut sculptures of four seated figures: Ra-Horakhty, the deified Ramesses II, and the gods Amun Ra and Ptah.

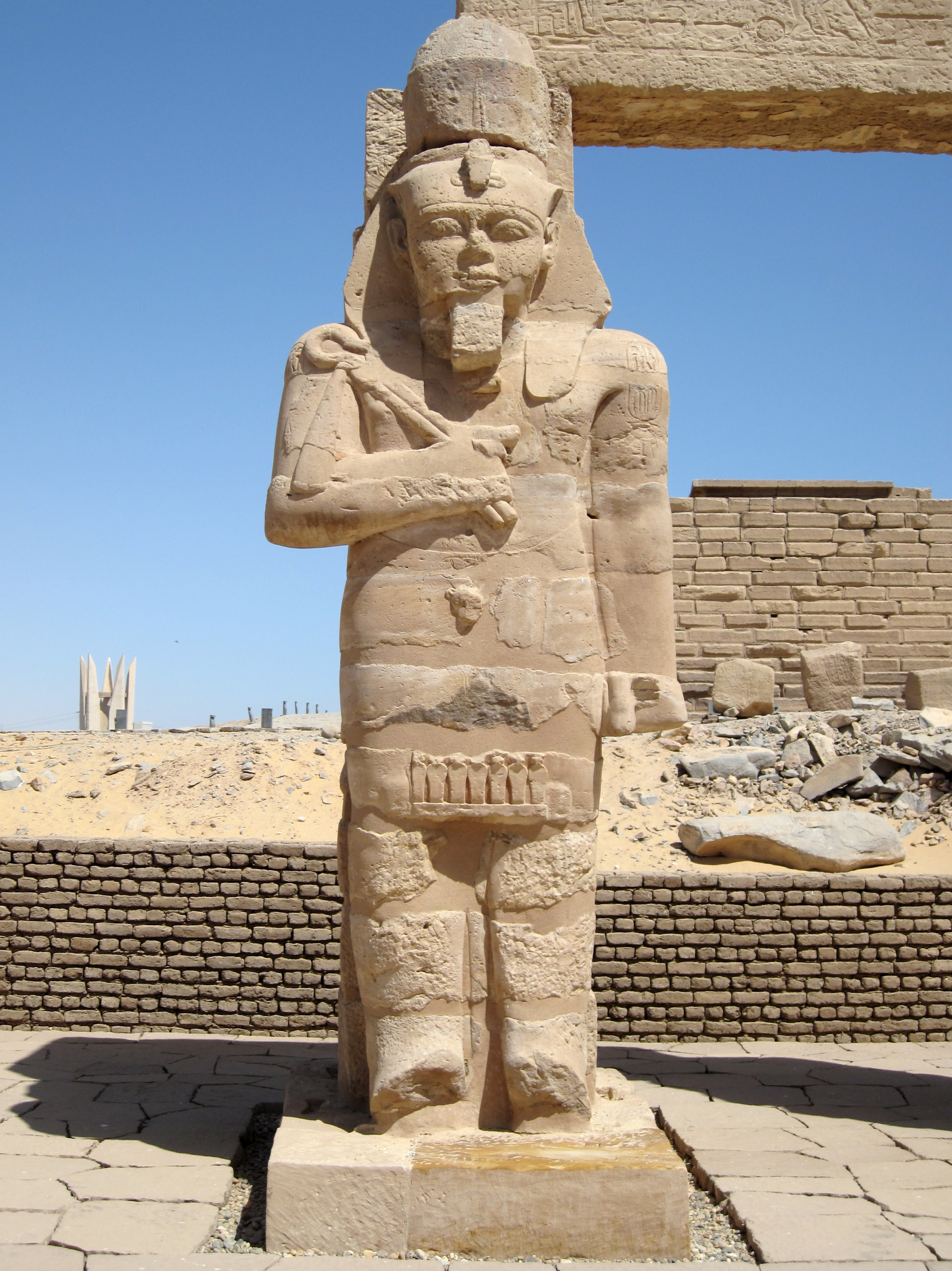
Somewhat "squat" statue of Ramesses II in the courtyard of the Temple of Gerf Hussein

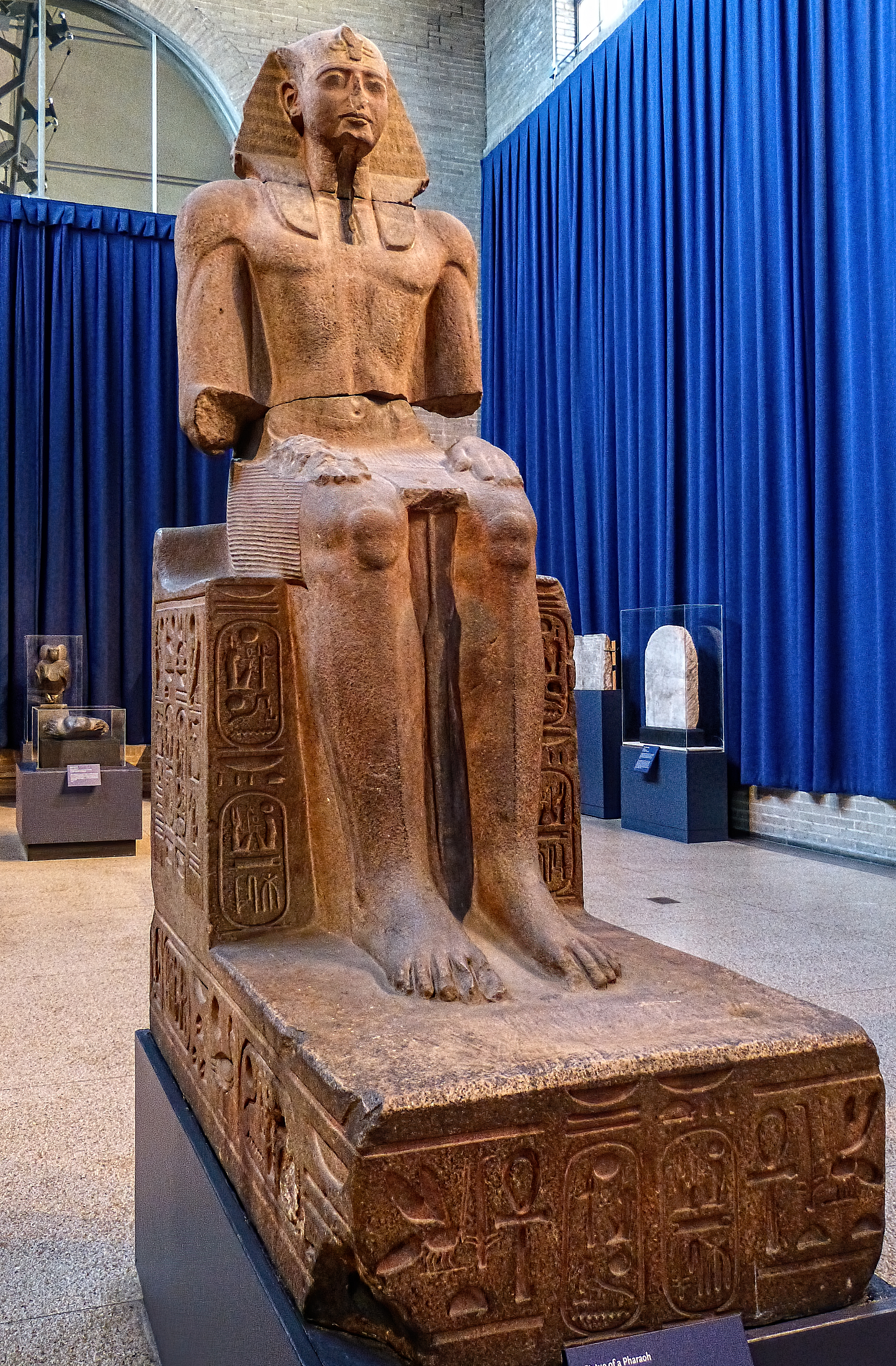
Statue of Ramesses II from Heracleopolis Magna

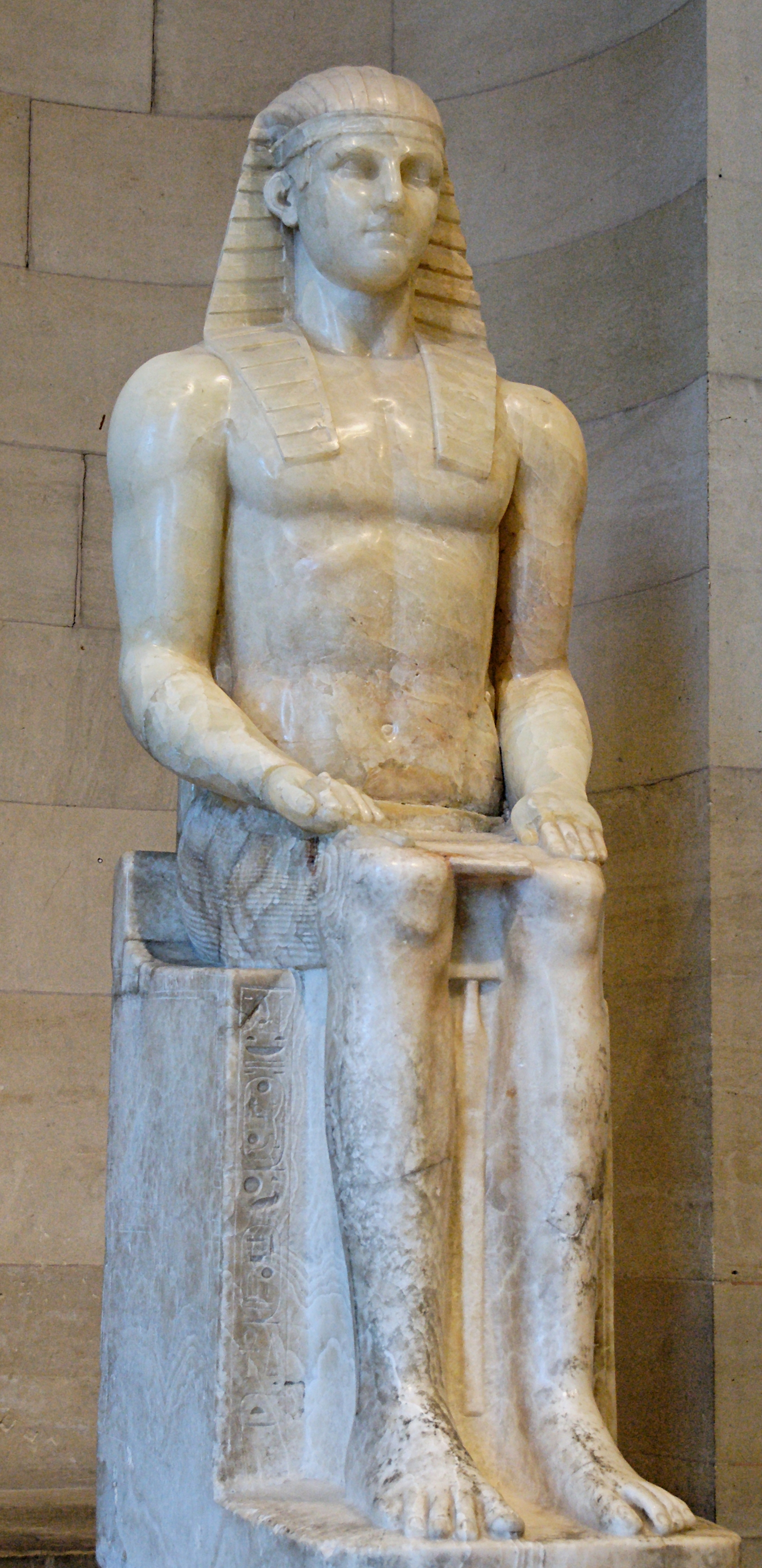
Statue of Ramesses II that was reworked in Roman times, now at the Louvre

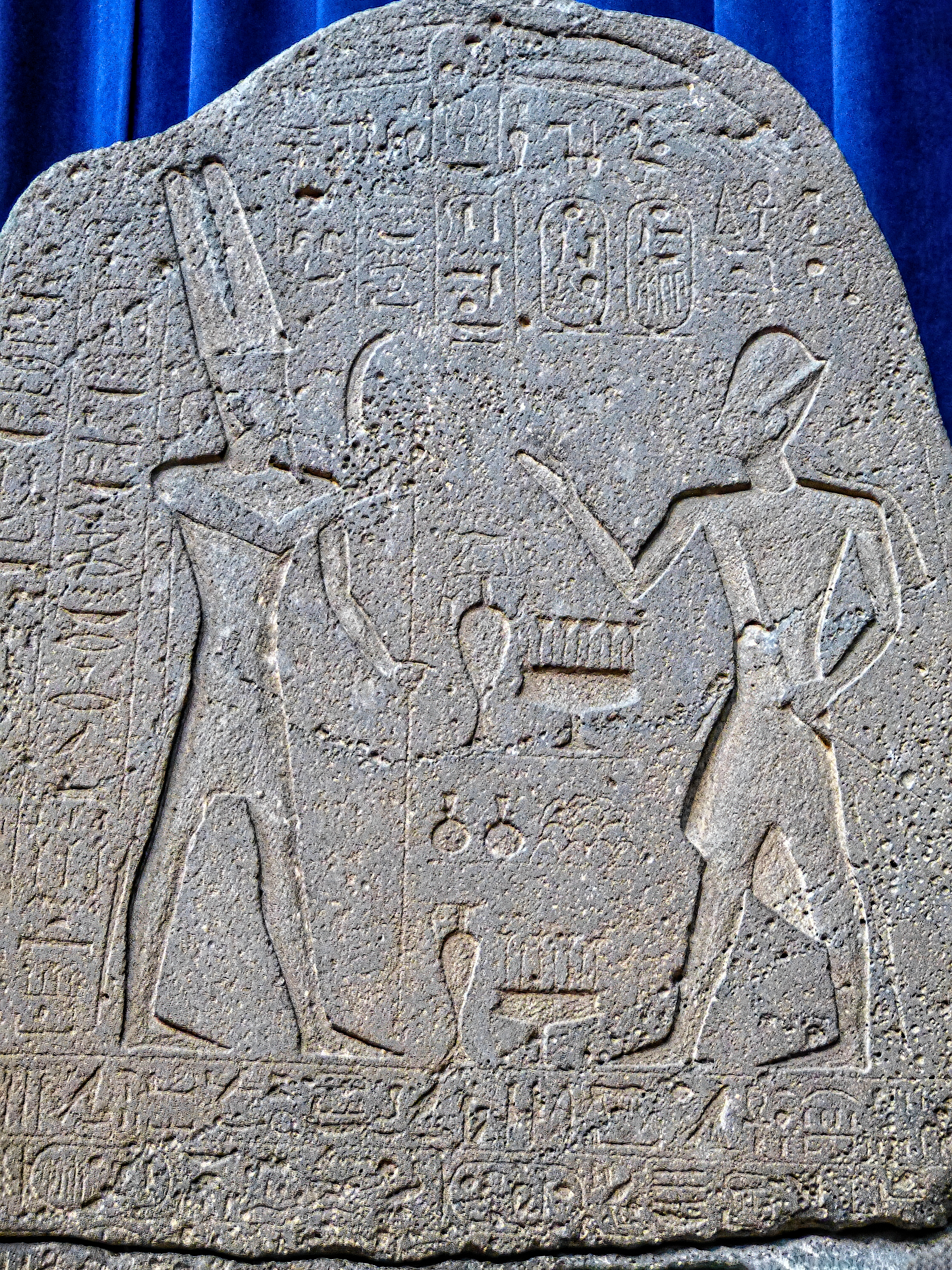
Top of a triumphal stela of Ramesses II giving offerings to Amun, excavated at Beth Shean, now at the Penn Museum

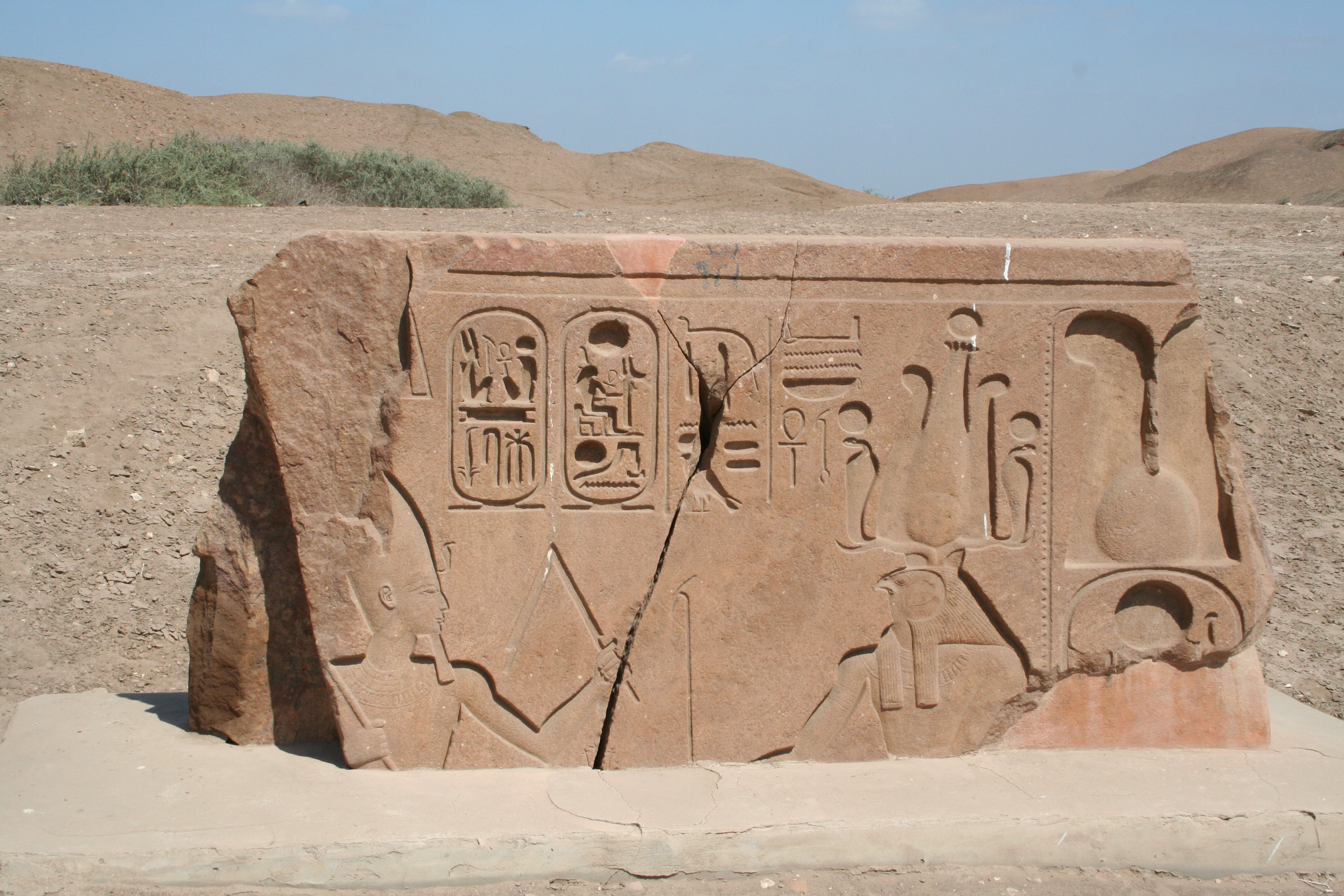
Reused building block found in Tanis that is thought originally to have been part of a depiction of the Sed festival for Ramesses II

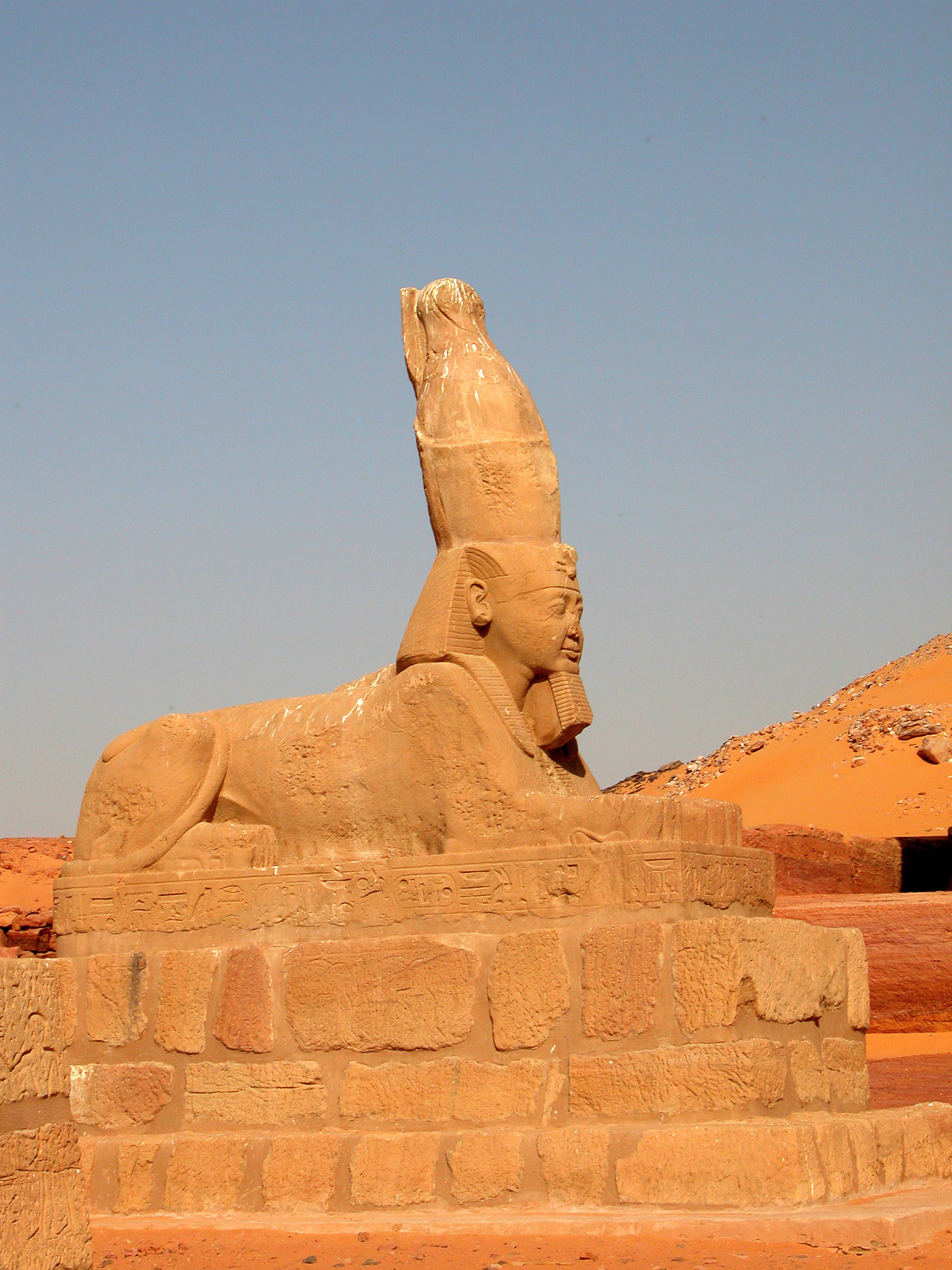
Sphinx of Ramesses II from the Temples of Wadi es-Sebua

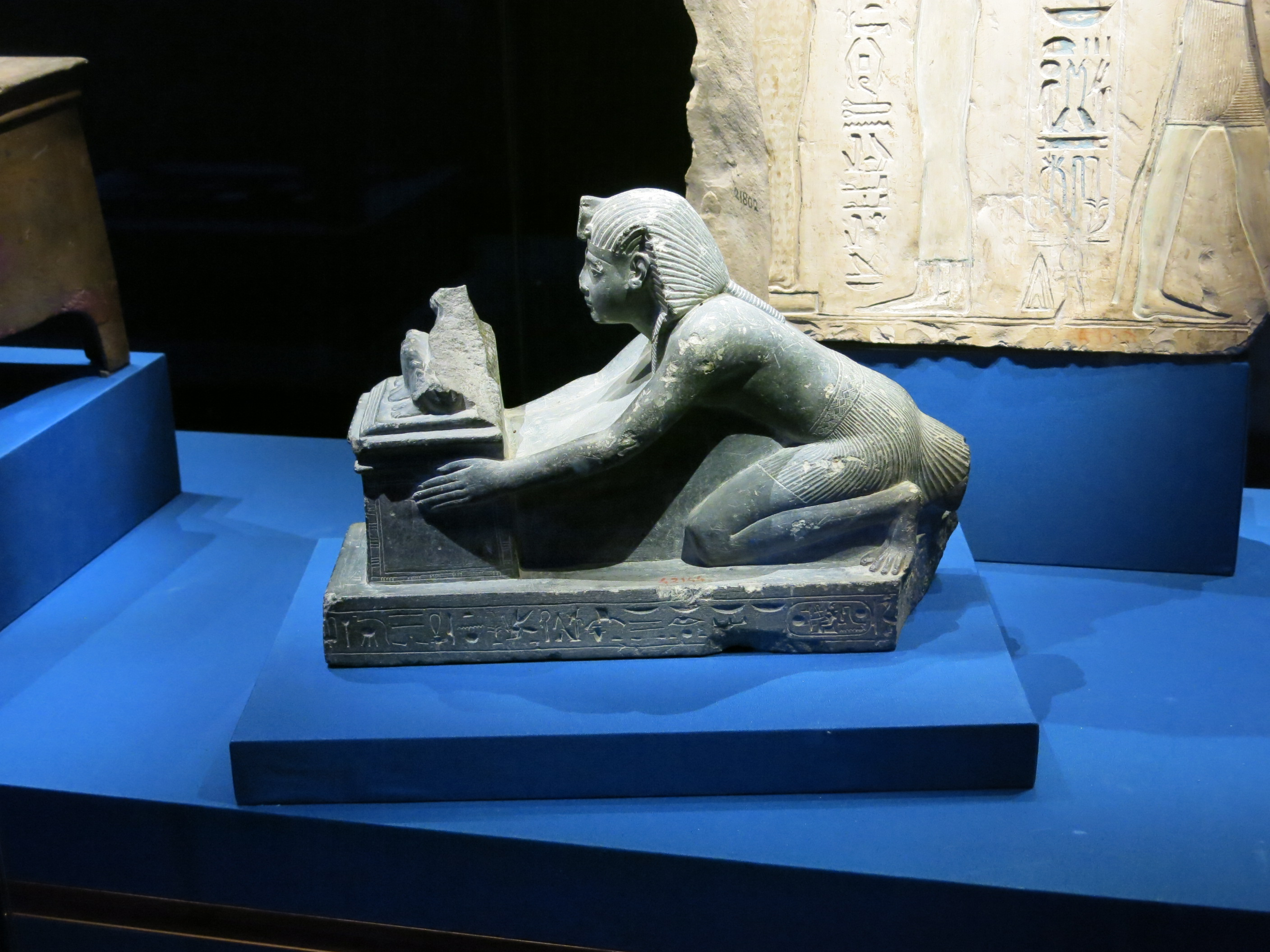
Statue of a kneeling Ramesses II offering a rebus of his name. Alexandria National Museum

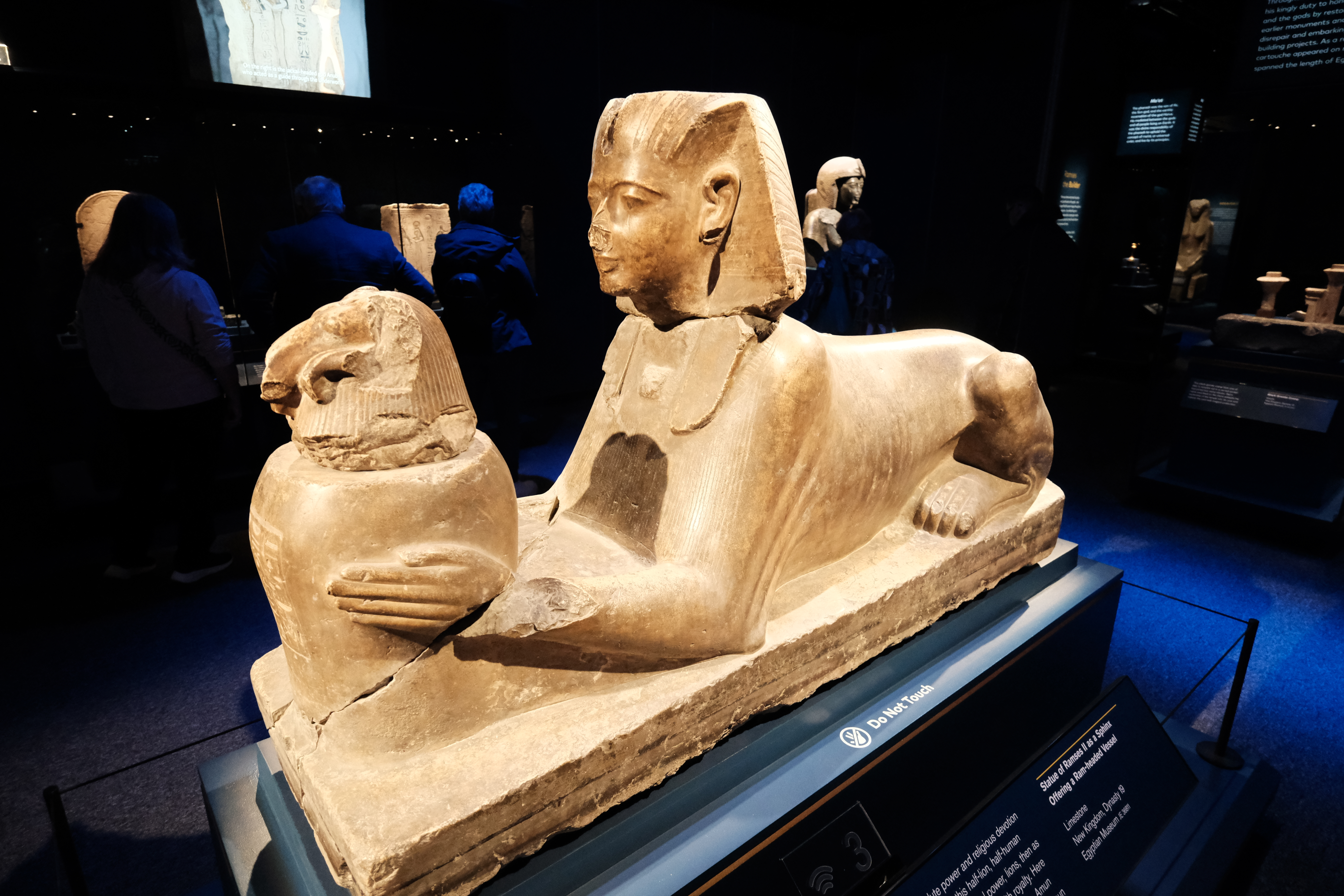
Statue of Ramesses II as a Sphinx Offering a Ram-headed Vessel

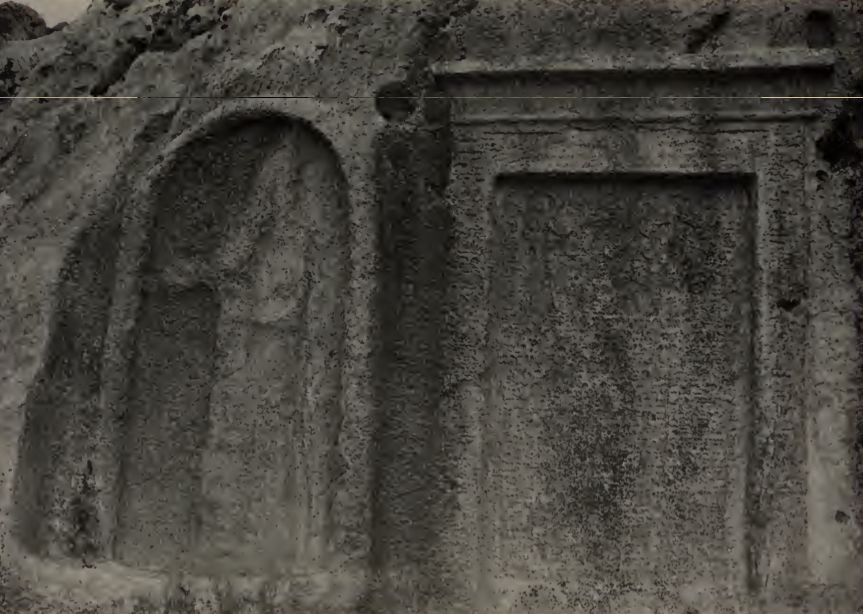
Commemorative stelae of Nahr el-Kalb show Assyrian king (Esarhaddon) (left) and Egyptian pharaoh (Ramesses II) (right). Photo taken in 1922.

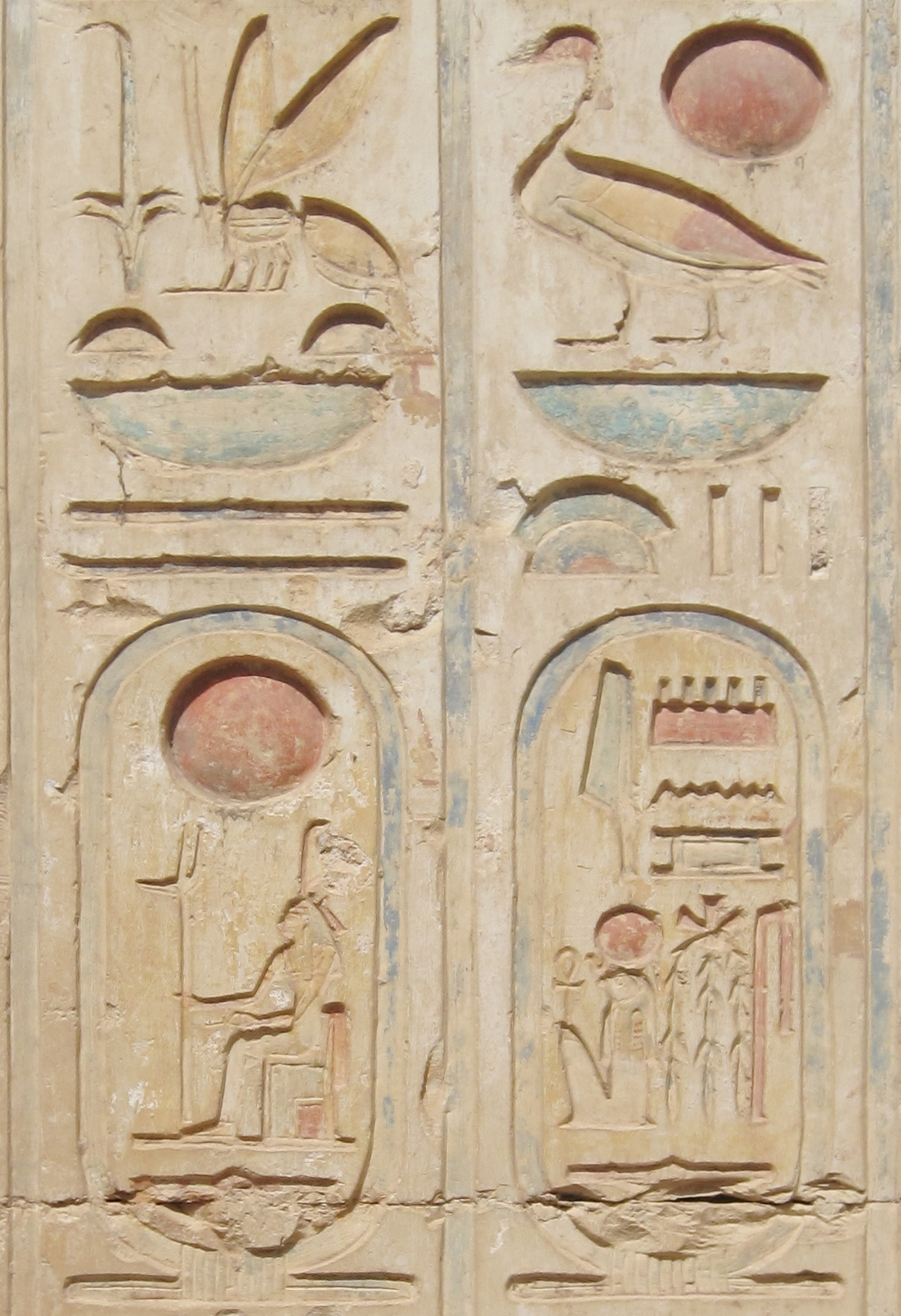
Birth and throne cartouches of Rameses II, from the early years of his reign as it shows his regnal name as "Usermaatre" instead of "Usermaatre-Setepenre"

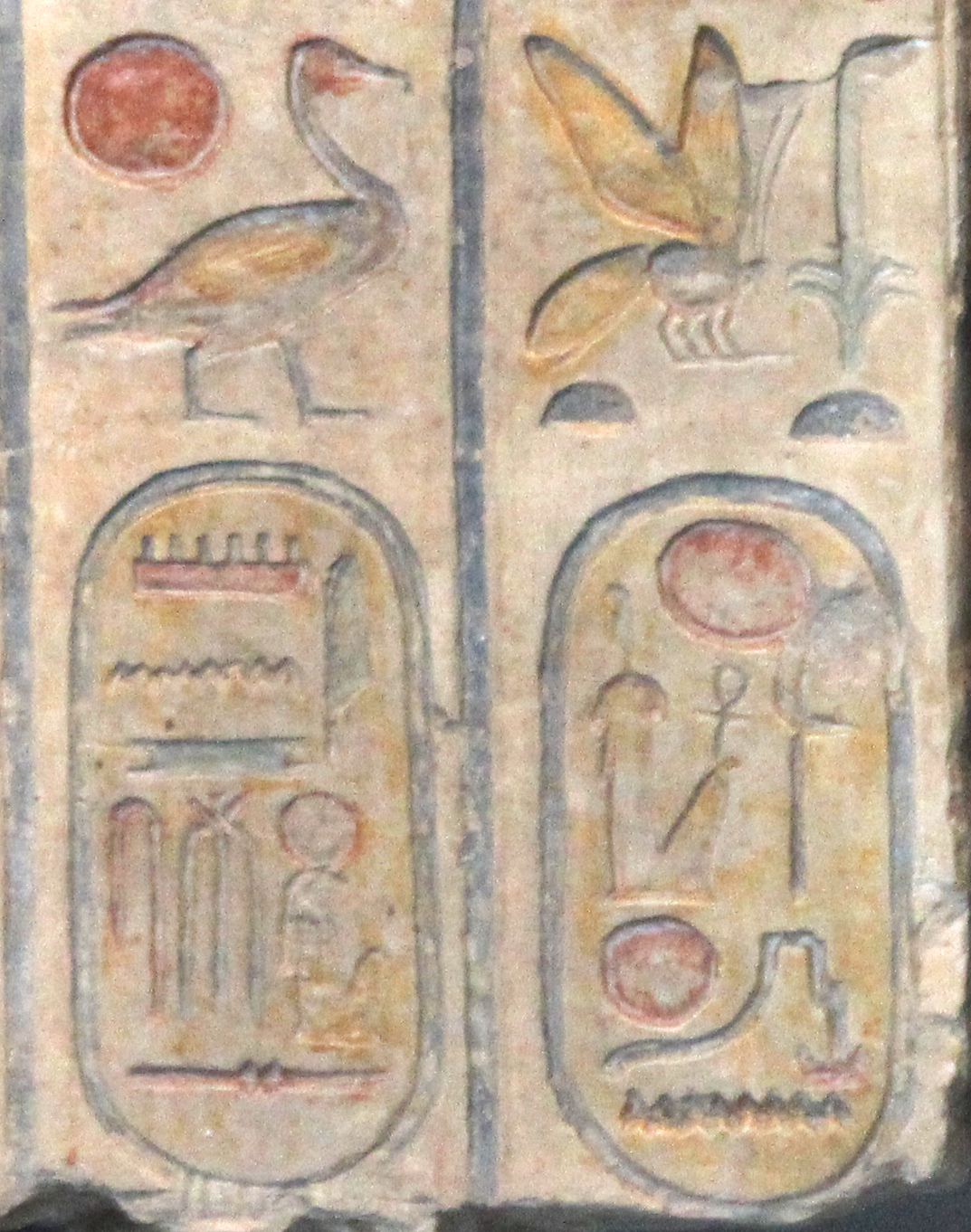
Birth and throne cartouches of Rameses II, from the temple of Ramesses II at Abydos in Egypt

== See also ==
- List of pharaohs
