= Colossi of Memnon =

Two Ancient Egyptian statues near Luxor

- Arabic: el-Colossat
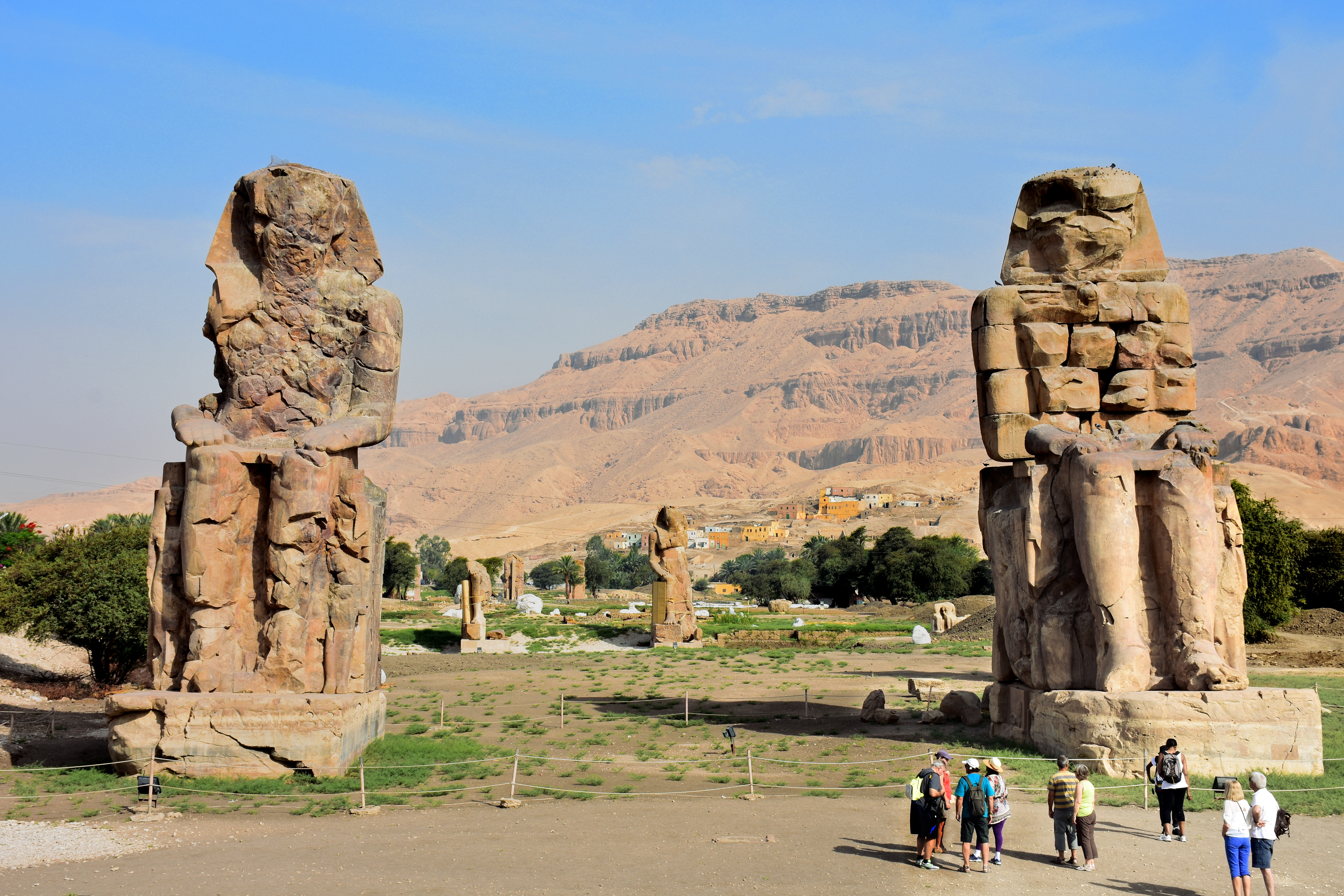
- The Colossi of Memnon in 2015
- Interactive map of Colossi of Memnon
- Location: West of Luxor
- Coordinates: 25°43′14″N 32°36′38″E
- Type: statue
- Material: quartzite stone
- Height: 18 m (60 ft)
- Completion date: 1350 BC
- Dedicated to: Amenhotep III

The Colossi of Memnon (Arabic: el-Colossat or es-Salamat) are two large stone statues of the Pharaoh Amenhotep III, which stand at the front of the ruined Mortuary Temple of Amenhotep III, the largest temple in the Theban Necropolis. They have stood since 1350 BC, and were well known to ancient Greeks and Romans, as well as early modern travelers and Egyptologists. The statues contain 107 Roman-era inscriptions in Greek and Latin, dated to between AD 20 and 250; many of these inscriptions on the northernmost statue make reference to the Greek mythological king Memnon, whom the statue was then erroneously thought to represent.

Scholars have debated how the identification of the northern colossus as "Memnon" is connected to the Greek name for the entire Theban Necropolis as the Memnonium.

== Description ==
The twin statues depict Amenhotep III (fl. 14th century BC) in a seated position, his hands resting on his knees and his gaze facing eastwards (actually ESE in modern bearings) towards the river. Three shorter figures are carved into the front throne alongside his legs: these are his wife Tiye and mother Mutemwiya. The middle between Amenhotep III's ankles would have been an unidentified daughter, although it has been destroyed. The side panels depict the Nile god Hapi.

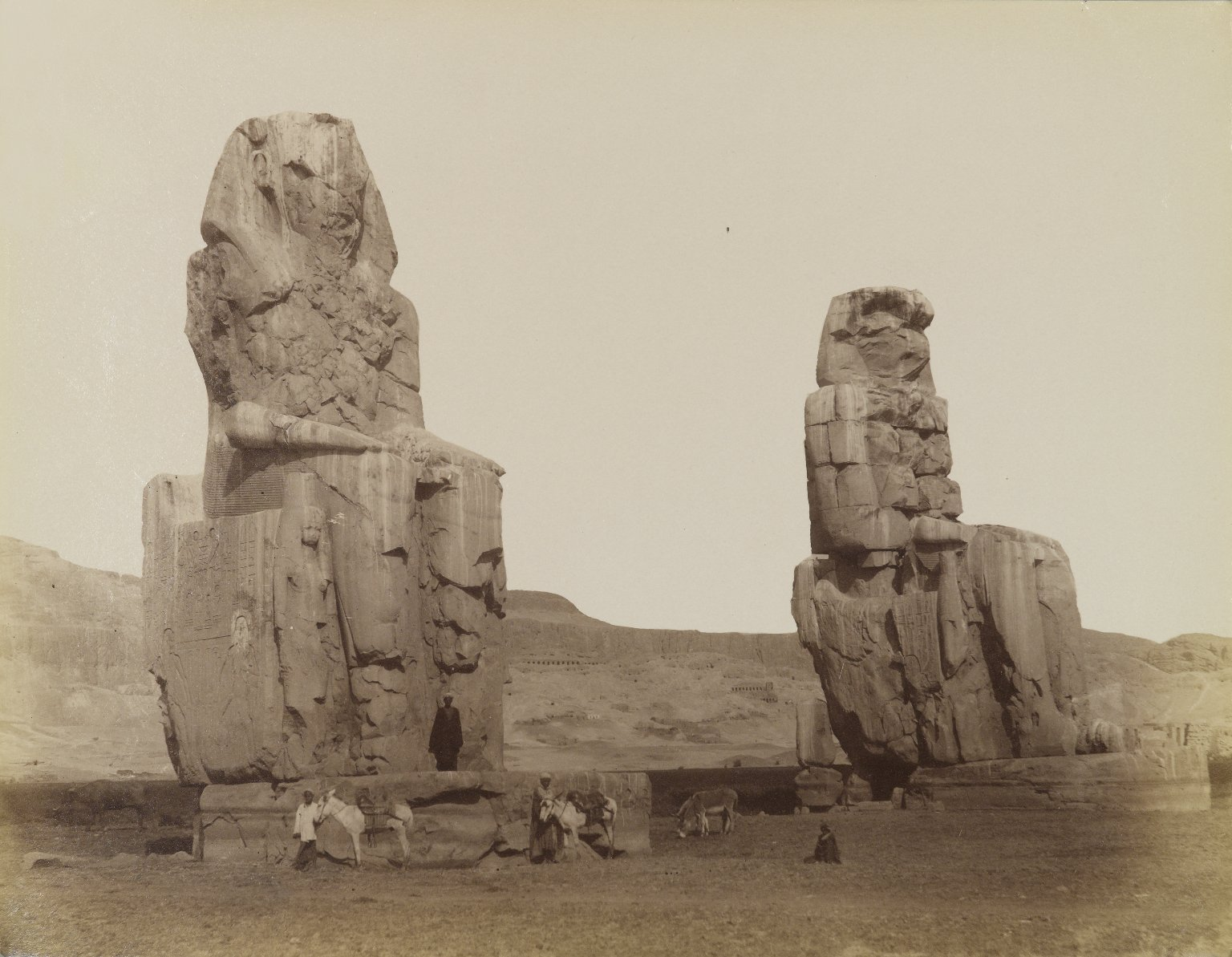
Antonio Beato, Colosses de Memnon, 19th century. Brooklyn Museum

The statues are made from blocks of quartzite sandstone which was quarried at el-Gabal el-Ahmar (near modern-day Cairo) and transported 675 km (420 mi) overland to Thebes (Luxor). The stones are believed to be too heavy to have been transported upstream on the Nile. The blocks used by later Roman engineers to reconstruct the northern colossus may have come from Edfu (north of Aswan). Including the stone platforms on which they stand – themselves about 4 m (13 ft) – the colossi reach 18 m (60 ft) in height and weigh an estimated 720 tons each. The two figures are about 15 m (50 ft) apart. The size of the statues makes them visible up to over 10 miles away. Regarding their size; they stood as the guardians of Amenhotep III's mortuary temple. Amenhotep III's process of immortalizing himself in statuary was prevalent, His approach to statuary representation and inscriptions had supported his ideology as being much more than the king of kings. His titles repeatedly called him the "good god". Suzanne Bickel describes the height of both colossi were accessible to the surrounding public as a method of allowing all to worship Amenhotep III himself and the gods at his temple.

Both statues are quite damaged, with the features above the waist virtually unrecognizable. The southern statue comprises a single piece of stone, but the northern figure has a large extensive crack in the lower half and above the waist consists of 5 tiers of stone. These upper levels consist of a different type of sandstone, and are the result of a later reconstruction attempt, which William de Wiveleslie Abney attributed to Septimius Severus. It is believed that originally the two statues were identical to each other, although inscriptions and minor art may have varied.

The original function of the Colossi was to stand guard at the entrance to Amenhotep's memorial temple (or mortuary temple): a massive construct built during the pharaoh's lifetime, where he was worshipped as a god-on-earth both before and after his departure from this world. In its day, this temple complex was the largest and most opulent in Ancient Egypt. Covering a total of 35 hectares (86 acres), even later rivals such as Ramesses II's Ramesseum or Ramesses III's Medinet Habu were unable to match it in area; even the Temple of Karnak, as it stood in Amenhotep's time, was smaller.

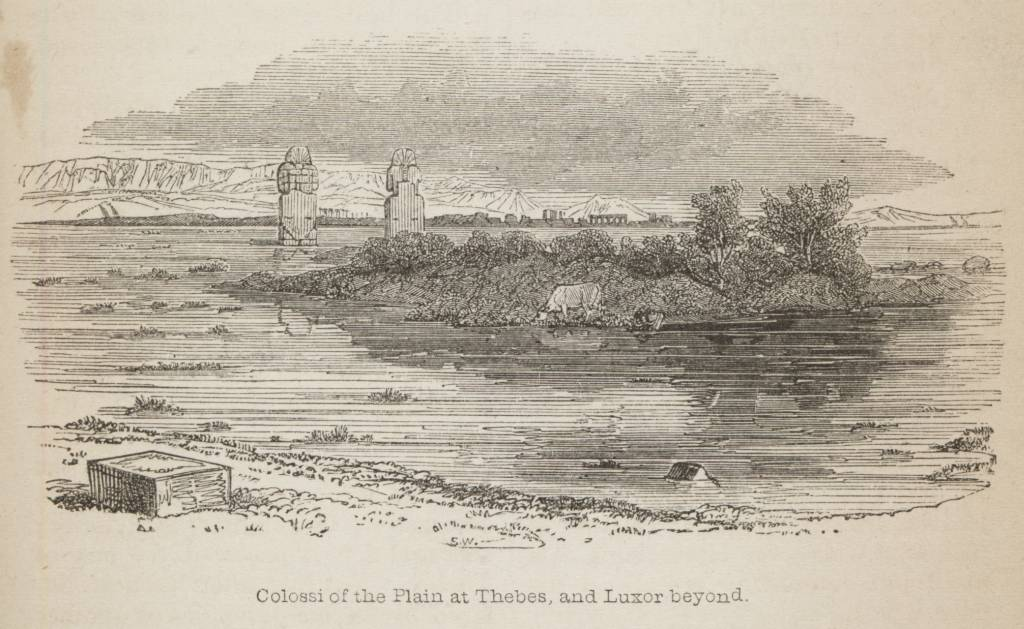
Colossi of Memnon, flooded plain

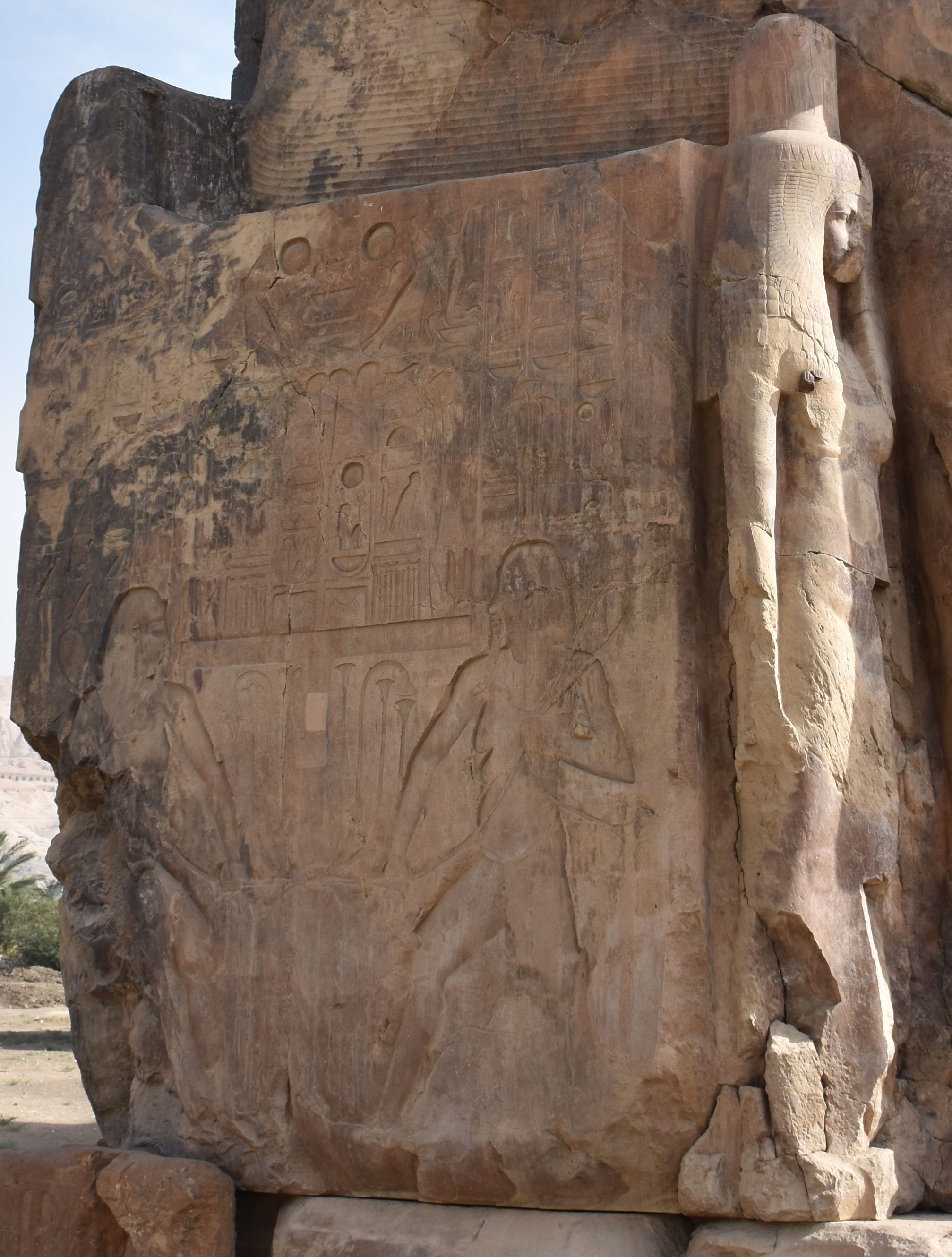
Side panel detail showing two flanked relief images of the deity Hapi and, to the right, a sculpture of the royal wife Tiye

== Floods ==
Amenhotep III had positioned the mortuary temple in front of the floodplain of the Nile in an effort to fill a lake in front of the Colossi. Furthermore, this lake acted as a water retention reservoir and prevented the temple from flooding completely during high inundations. Hourig Sourouzian felt that Amenhotep III did not plan for the site to flood altogether as the surrounding wall for the mortuary temple behind the Colossi was constructed primarily of mud brick.

With the exception of the Colossi, however, very little remains today of Amenhotep's temple. It stood on the edge of the Nile floodplain, and successive annual inundations gnawed away at its foundations – a 1840s lithograph by David Roberts shows the Colossi surrounded by water – and it was not unknown for later rulers to dismantle, purloin, and reuse portions of their predecessors' monuments.

== Roman era inscriptions ==
The statues contain 107 Roman-era inscriptions in Greek and Latin, dated between 20-250CE; these inscriptions allowed modern travellers to connect the statues to the classical Greek and Latin literature. Many of the inscriptions include the name "Memnon". Several of the inscriptions refer to sounds emitted by the statues, the most famous being poetry by Julia Balbilla recording multiple visits during November 130 CE in a party that included the Emperor Hadrian and his wife Vibia Sabina. Of the 107 Roman-era inscriptions: 61 of them are written in Greek, 45 are written in Latin, and one bilingual text is written.

They were first studied in detail by Jean-Antoine Letronne in his 1831 La statue vocale de Memnon considérée dans ses rapports avec l'Égypte et la Grèce and then catalogued in the second volume (1848) of his Recueil des inscriptions grecques et latines de l'Égypte.

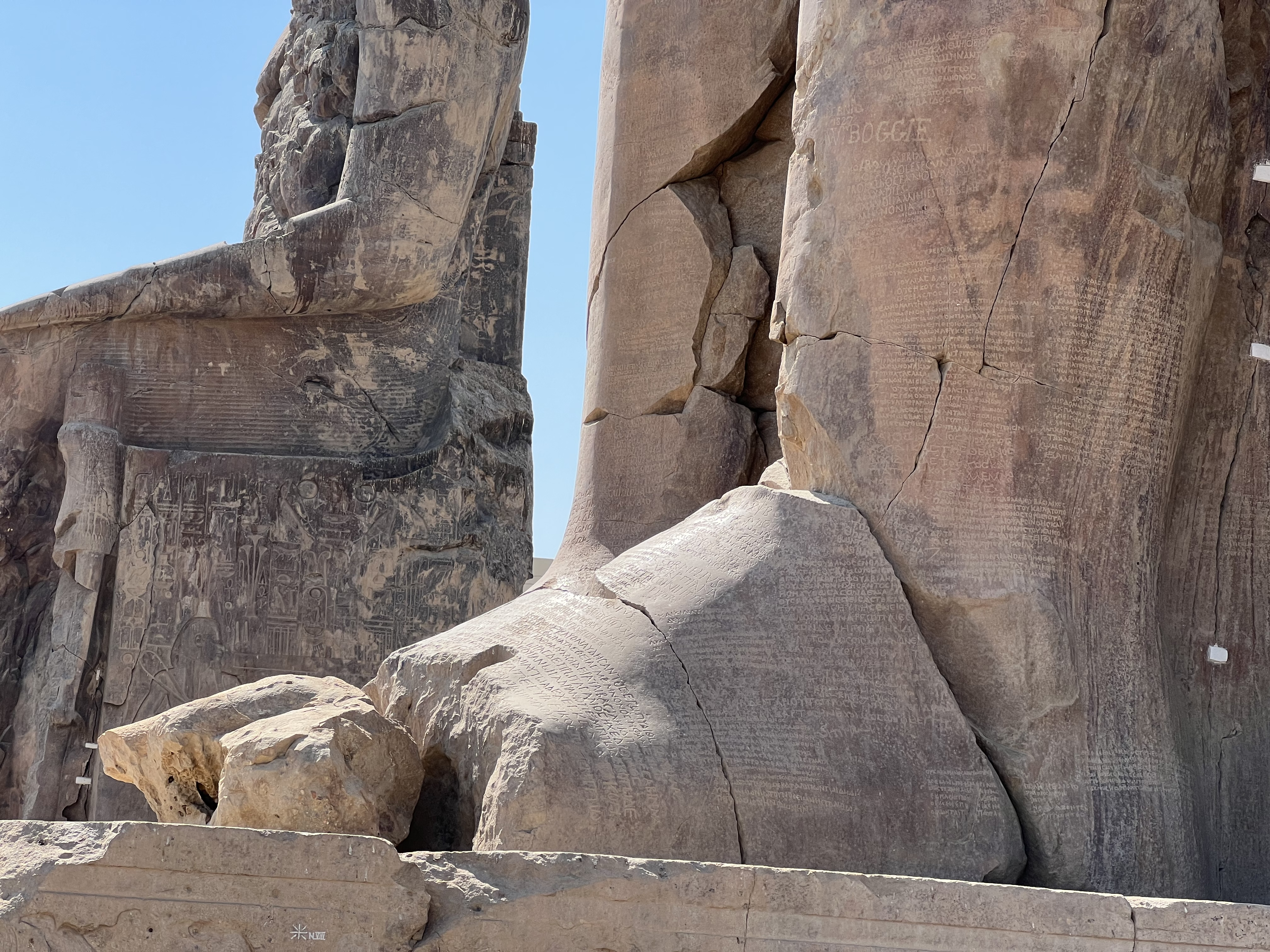

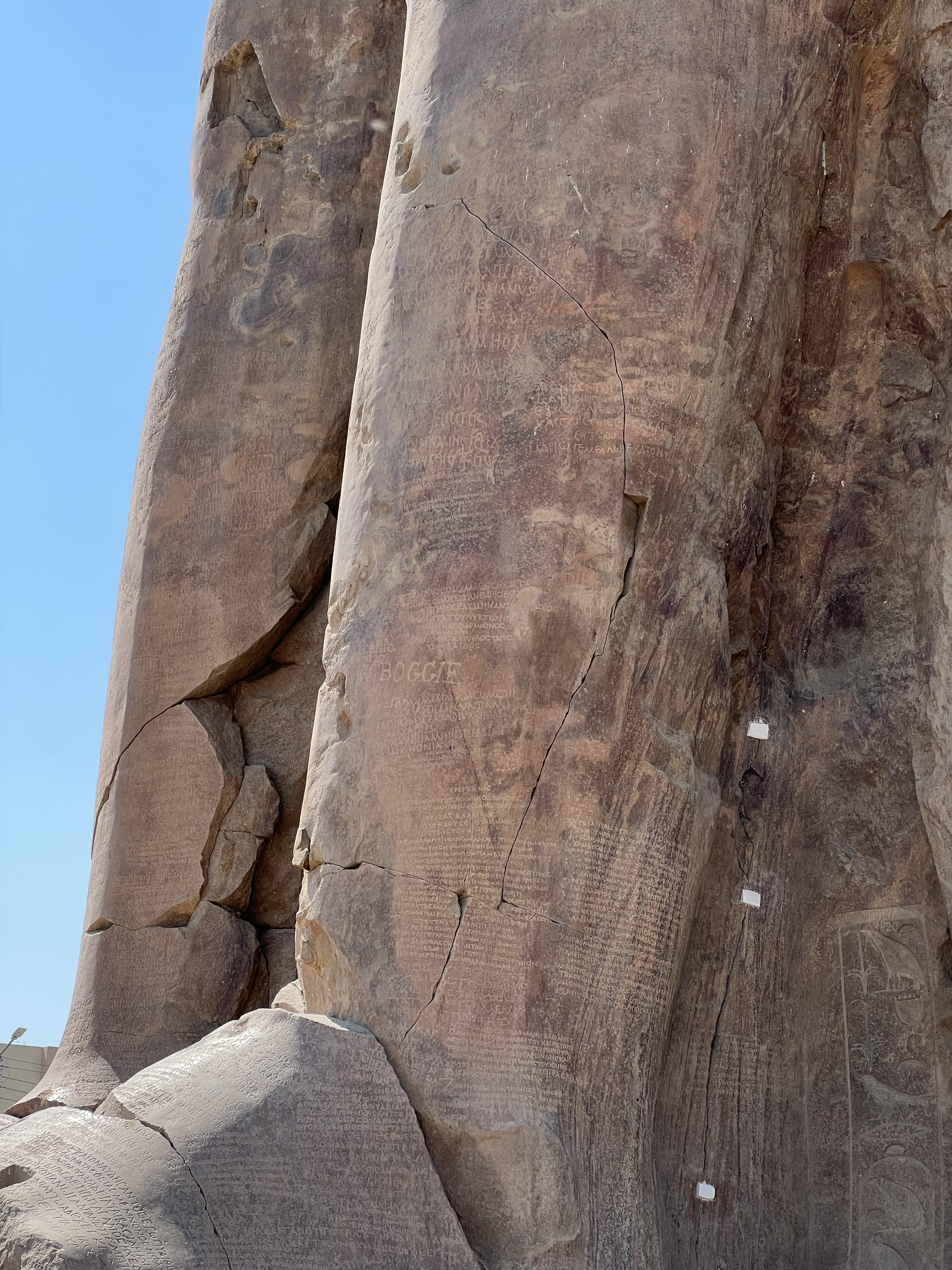

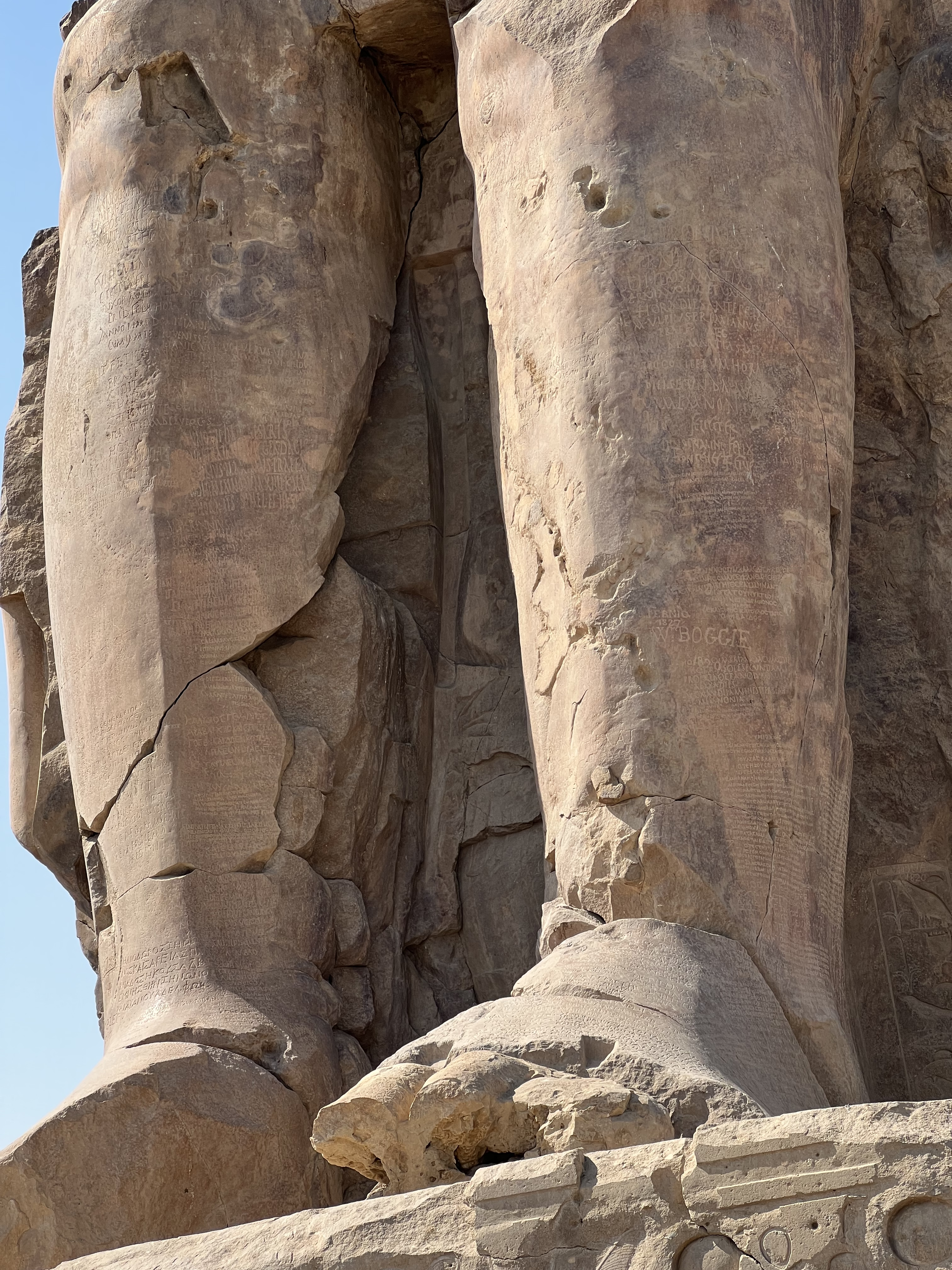

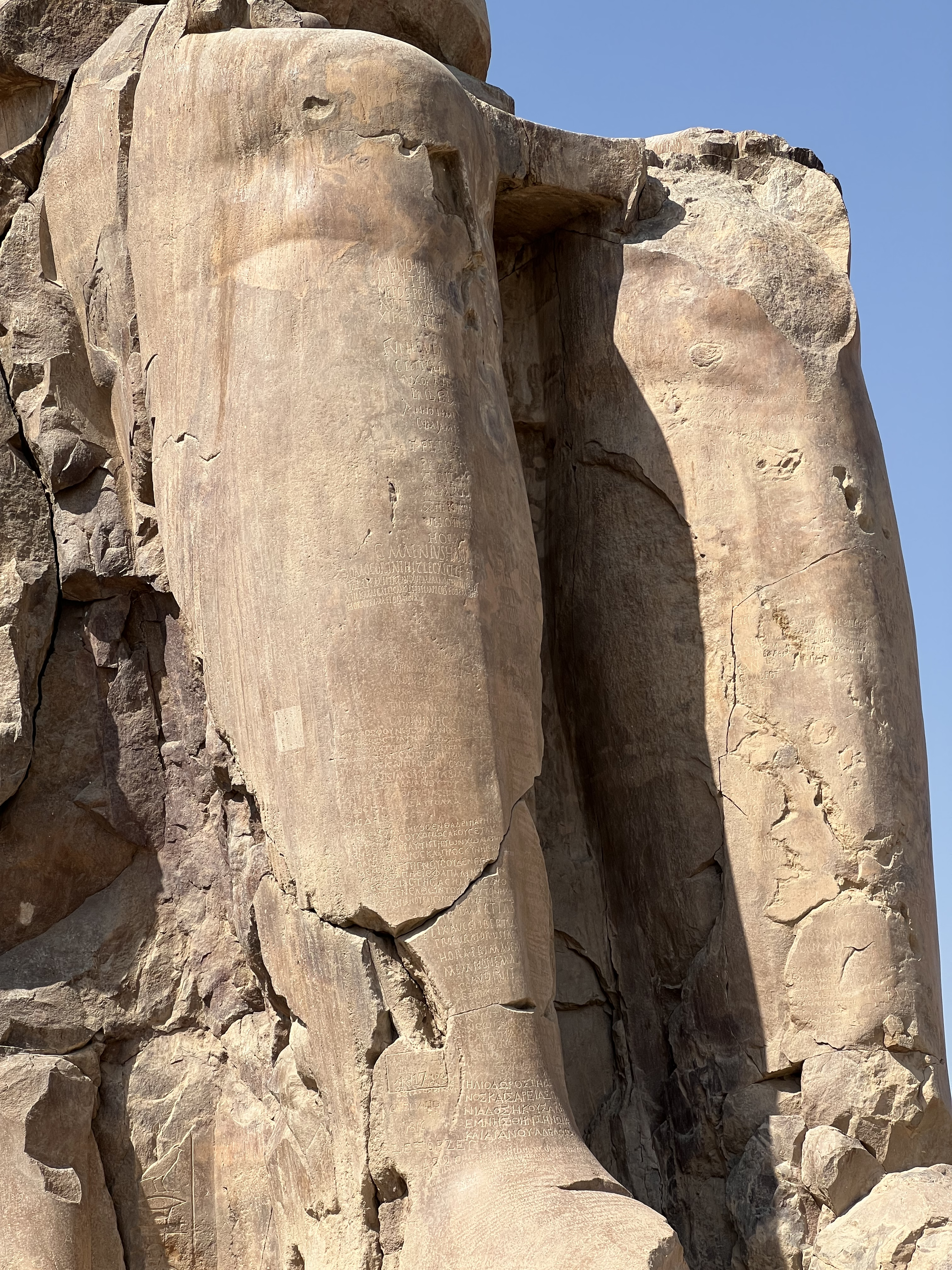

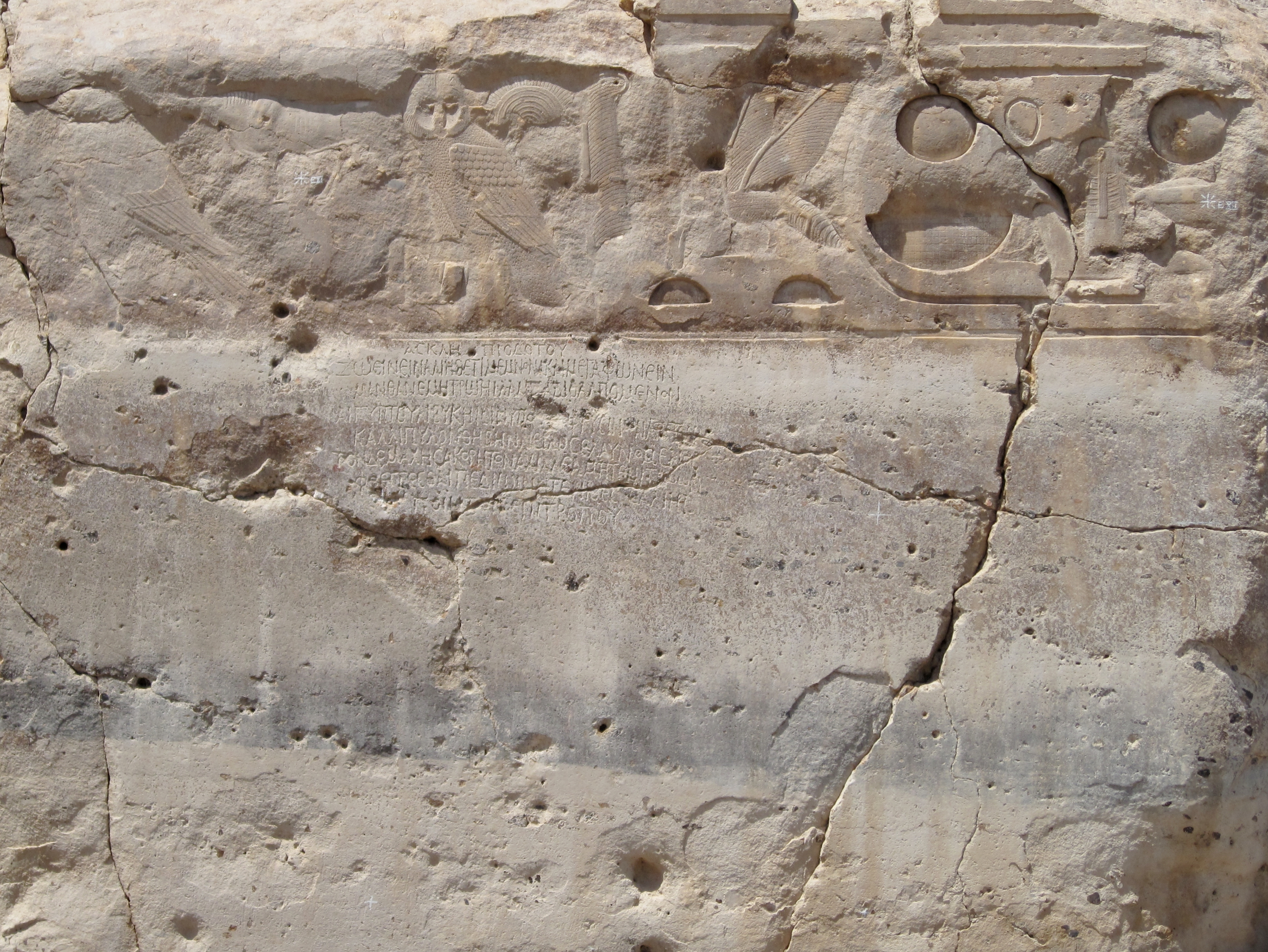
Base inscriptions

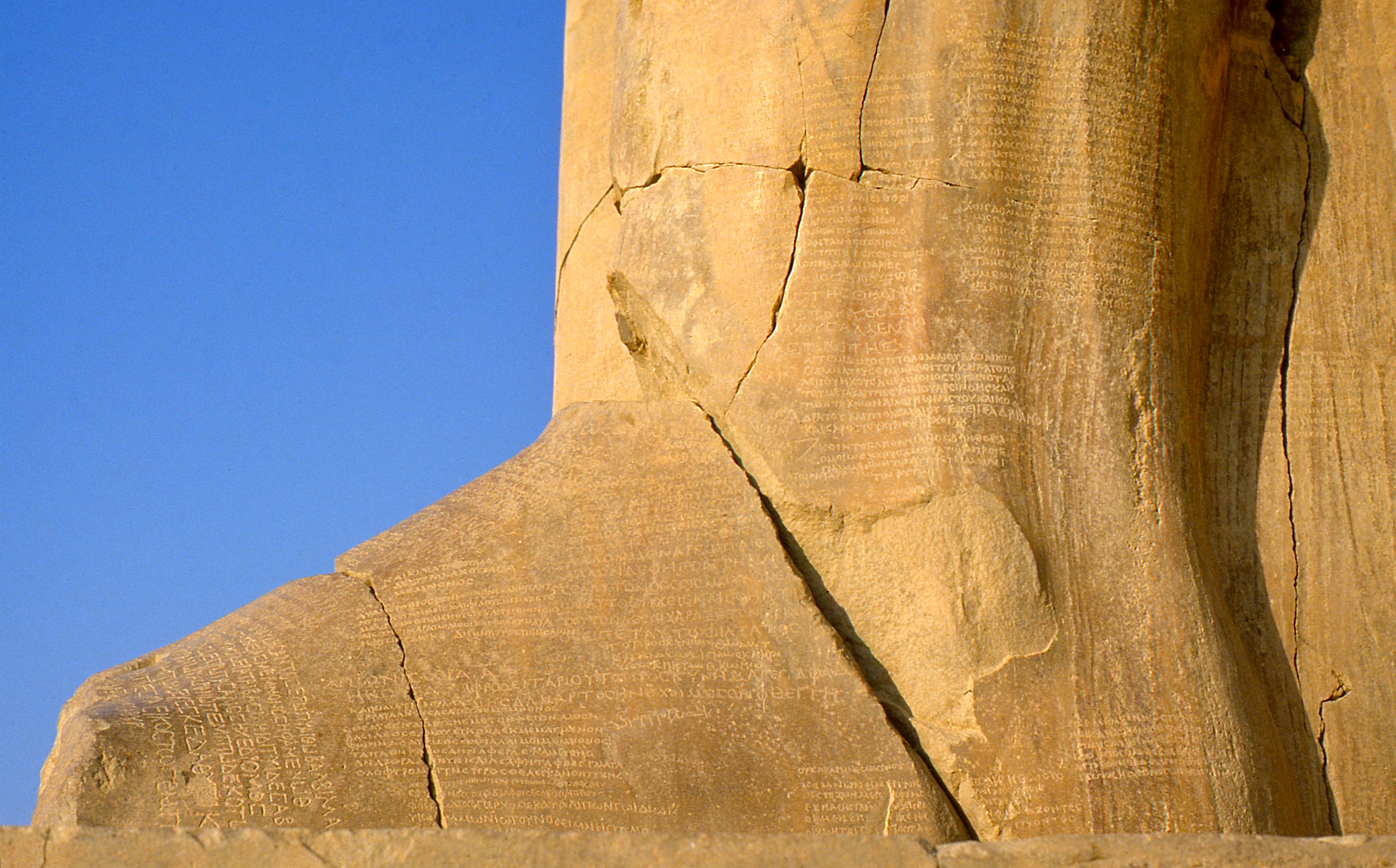
Leg inscriptions

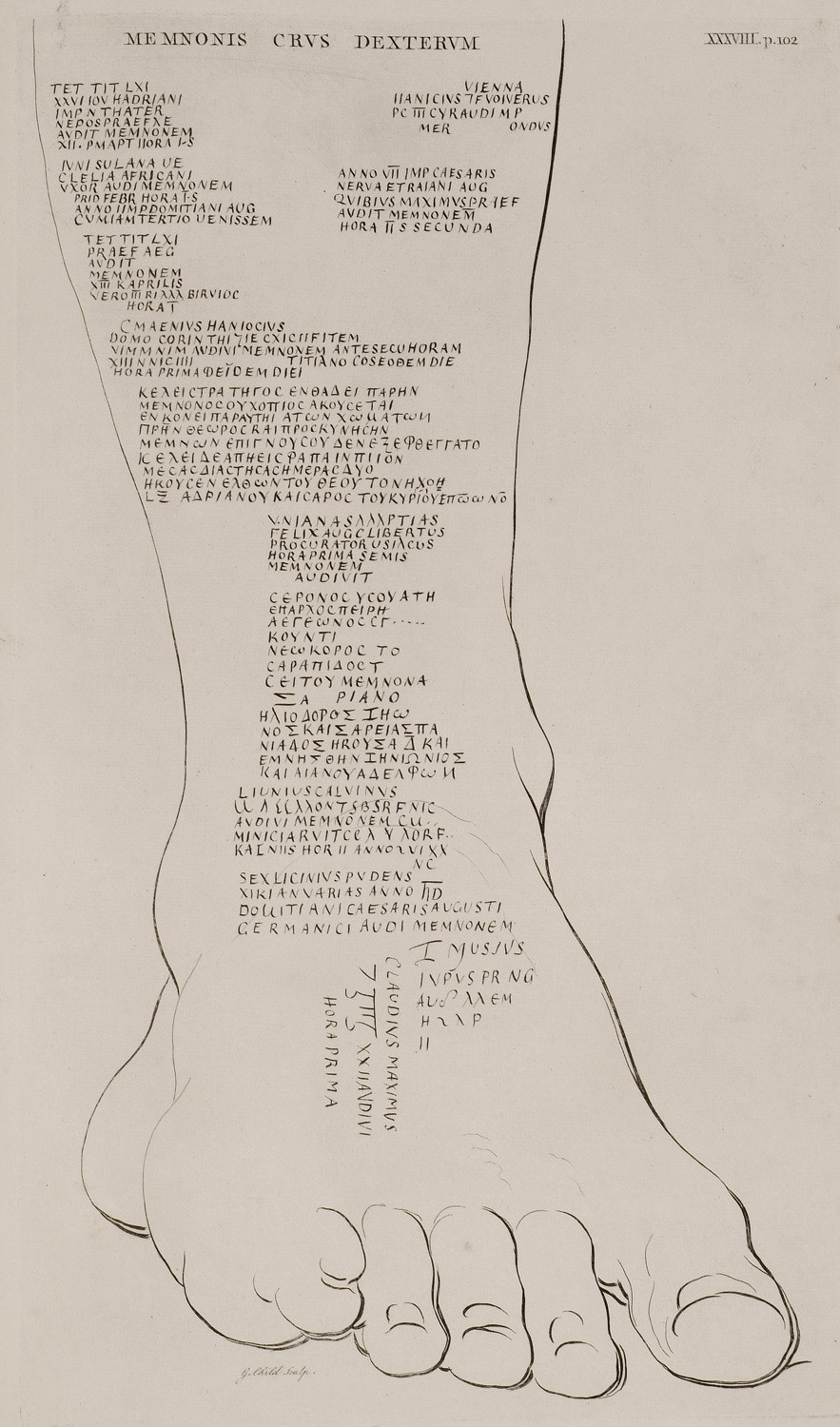
1743 transcription

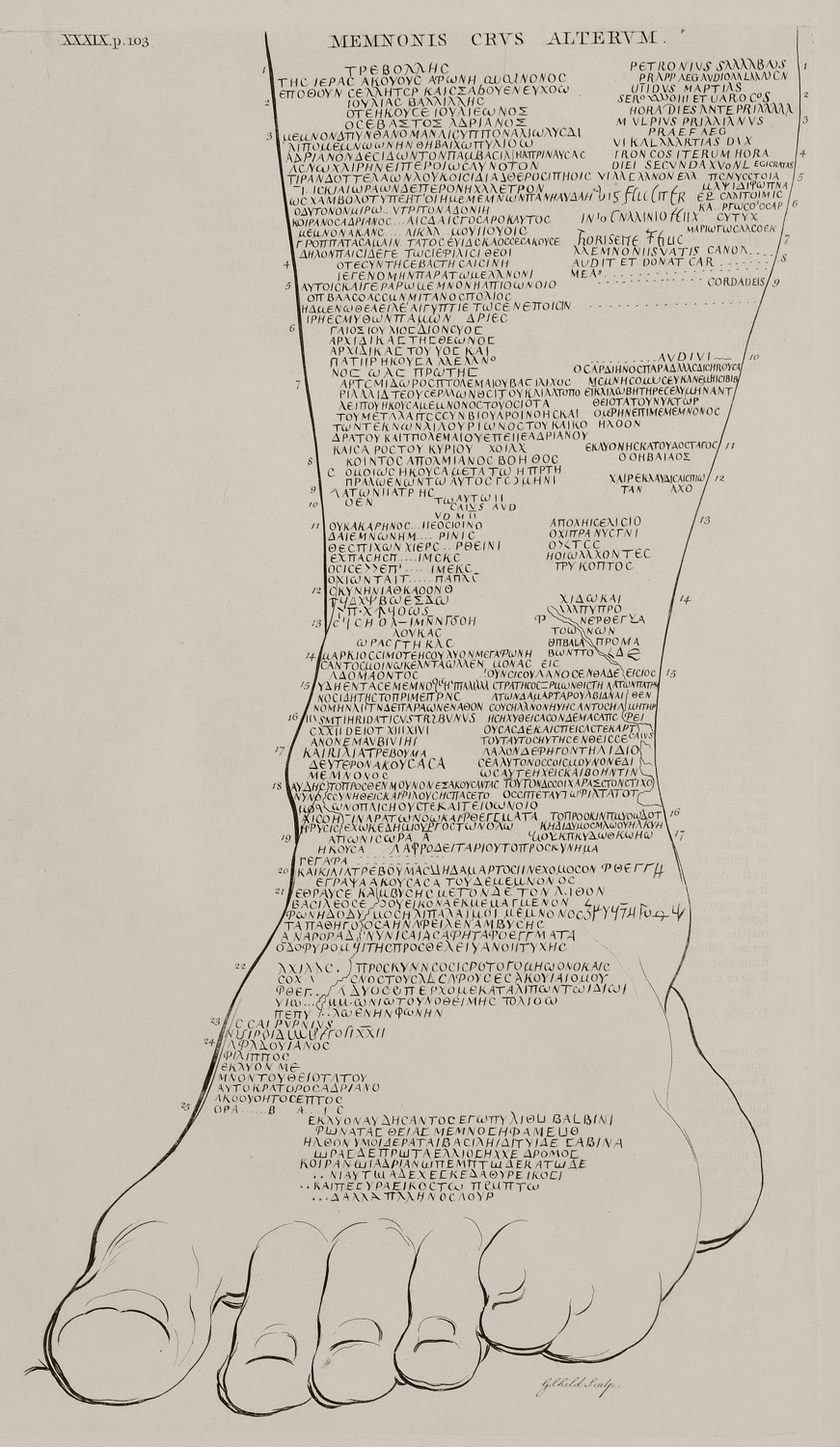
1743 transcription

== Earthquakes ==
Soon after its construction the temple was destroyed by an earthquake, recently dated by the Armenian Institute of Seismology to around 1200 BC, which left only the two huge colossi at the entrance still standing. These were further destroyed by an earthquake in 27 BC, after which they were partly reconstructed by the Roman authorities.

The 1200 BC earthquake also opened numerous chasms in the ground which meant that many statues were buried, some in pristine condition. These have been the subject of extensive restoration and excavation conducted by the Armenian/German archaeologist Hourig Sourouzian, who has revealed that the complex consisted of three pylons, each fronted by colossal statues, while at the far end a rectangular Temple complex consisted of a peristyle court surrounded by columns. So far four of the statues have been re-erected, with eight waiting to be re-erected, while some 200 statues or pieces of statues are in the Luxor Museum, some on display, others in store awaiting conservation.

== Name ==
The modern Arabic name is Kom el-Hatan, but it is generally known by the Roman name as the Temple of Memnon. Memnon was a hero of the Trojan War and King of Ethiopia, who led his armies from Africa into Asia Minor to help defend the beleaguered city of Troy but was ultimately slain by Achilles. Memnon (whose name means the Steadfast or Resolute) was said to be the son of Eos, the goddess of dawn. He was associated with colossi built several centuries earlier, because of the reported cry at dawn of the northern statue (see below), which became known as the Colossus of Memnon. Eventually, the entire Theban Necropolis became generally referred to as the Memnonium making him "Ruler of the west" as in the case of the god Osiris who was called chief of the west.

In the 19th century, William de Wiveleslie Abney noted that "[t]he Arabs called these statues 'Shama' and 'Tama', and when speaking of them together gave them the appelation of Sanamât, or the idols."

== Sounds ==
In 27 BCE, a large earthquake reportedly shattered the northern colossus, collapsing it from the waist up and cracking the lower half. Following its rupture, the remaining lower half of this statue was then reputed to "sing" on various occasions – always within an hour or two of sunrise, usually right at dawn. The sound was most often reported in February or March, but this is probably more a reflection of the tourist season rather than any actual pattern.

The earliest report in literature is that of the Greek historian and geographer Strabo, who said that he heard the sound during a visit in 20 BCE, by which time it apparently was already well-known. (Note: I too, when I was present at the places with Aelius Gallus and his crowd of associates, both friends and soldiers, heard the noise at about the first hour, but whether it came from the base or from the colossus, or whether the noise was made on purpose by one of the men who were standing all round and near to the base, I am unable positively to assert; for on account of the uncertainty of the cause I am induced to believe anything rather than that the sound issued from stones thus fixed. Strabo, Rerum Geographicarum. XVII 1.46) The description varied; Strabo said it sounded "like a blow", Pausanias compared it to "the string of a lyre" breaking, but it also was described as the striking of brass or whistling. Other ancient sources include Pliny (not from personal experience, but he collected other reports), Tacitus, Philostratus and Juvenal. In addition, the base of the statue is inscribed with about 90 surviving inscriptions of contemporary tourists reporting whether they had heard the sound or not.

The legend of the "Vocal Memnon", the luck that hearing it was reputed to bring, and the reputation of the statue's oracular powers became known outside of Egypt, and a constant stream of visitors, including several Roman emperors, came to marvel at the statues. The last recorded reliable mention of the sound dates from 196. Sometime later in the Roman era, the upper tiers of sandstone were added (the original remains of the top half have never been found); the date of this reconstruction is unknown, but local tradition places it circa 199, and attributes it to the Roman Emperor Septimius Severus in an attempt to curry favour with the oracle (it is known that he visited the statue, but did not hear the sound).

Various explanations have been offered for the phenomenon; these are of two types: natural or man-made. Strabo himself apparently was too far away to be able to determine its nature: he reported that he could not determine if it came from the pedestal, the shattered upper area, or "the people standing around at the base". If natural, the sound was probably caused by rising temperatures and the evaporation of dew inside the porous rock.

Similar sounds, although much rarer, have been heard from some of the other Egyptian monuments (Karnak is the usual location for more modern reports). Perhaps the most convincing argument against it being the result of human agents is that it did cease, probably due to the added weight of the reconstructed upper tiers.

Since the northernmost statue is commonly associated with the renowned acoustic phenomenon, much of the literature and cultural discourse tends to overlook the southern counterpart. Despite its significance as a key structure commissioned by Amenhotep III, this oversight persisted. As a result, many Greco-Roman travelers, drawn by the mystique of the site, would etch their names upon the colossi during their visits, leaving behind inscriptions that reflect their fascination and desire for posterity.

== Gallery ==
=== Modern images ===
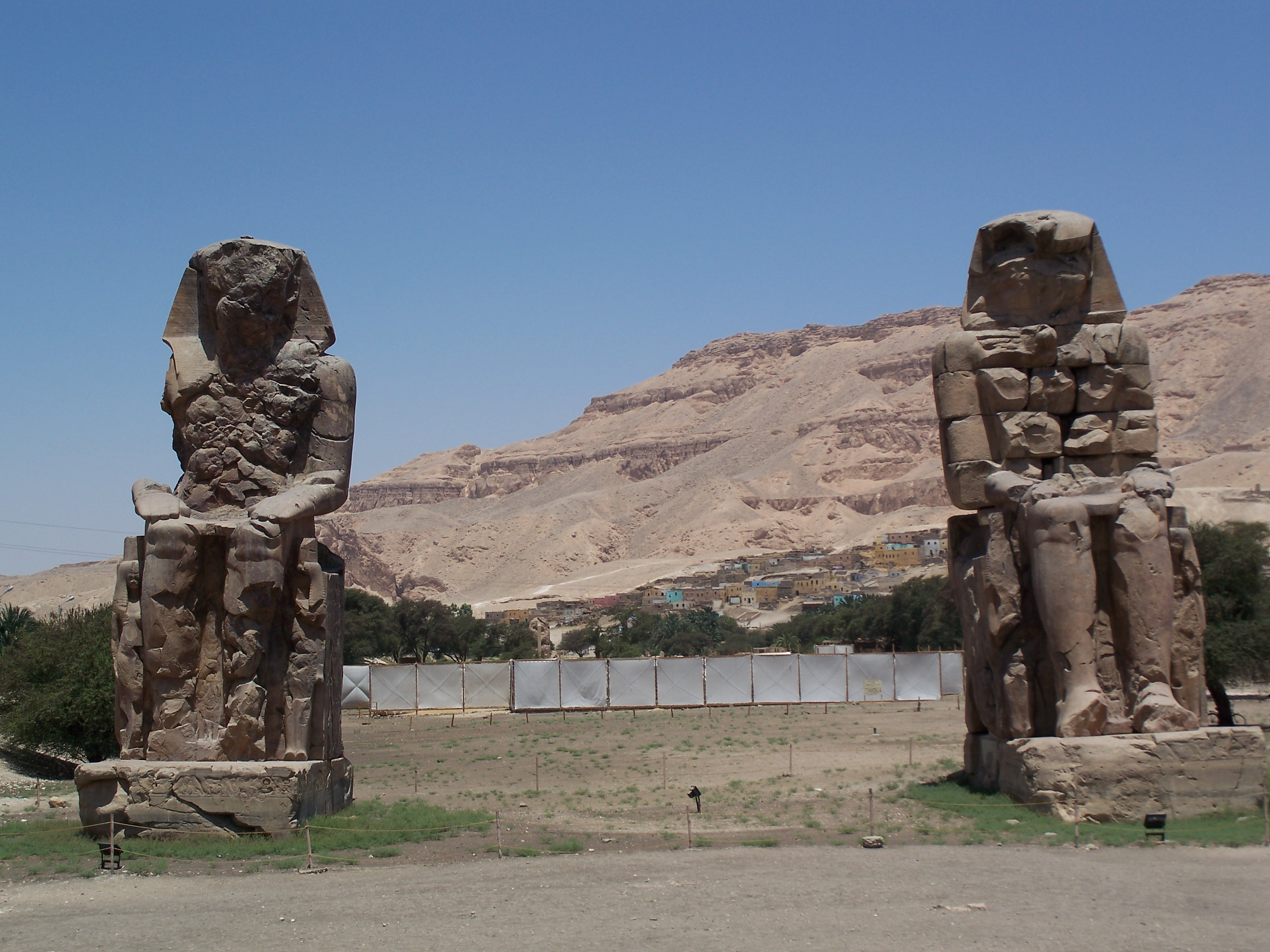
The colossi of Memnon

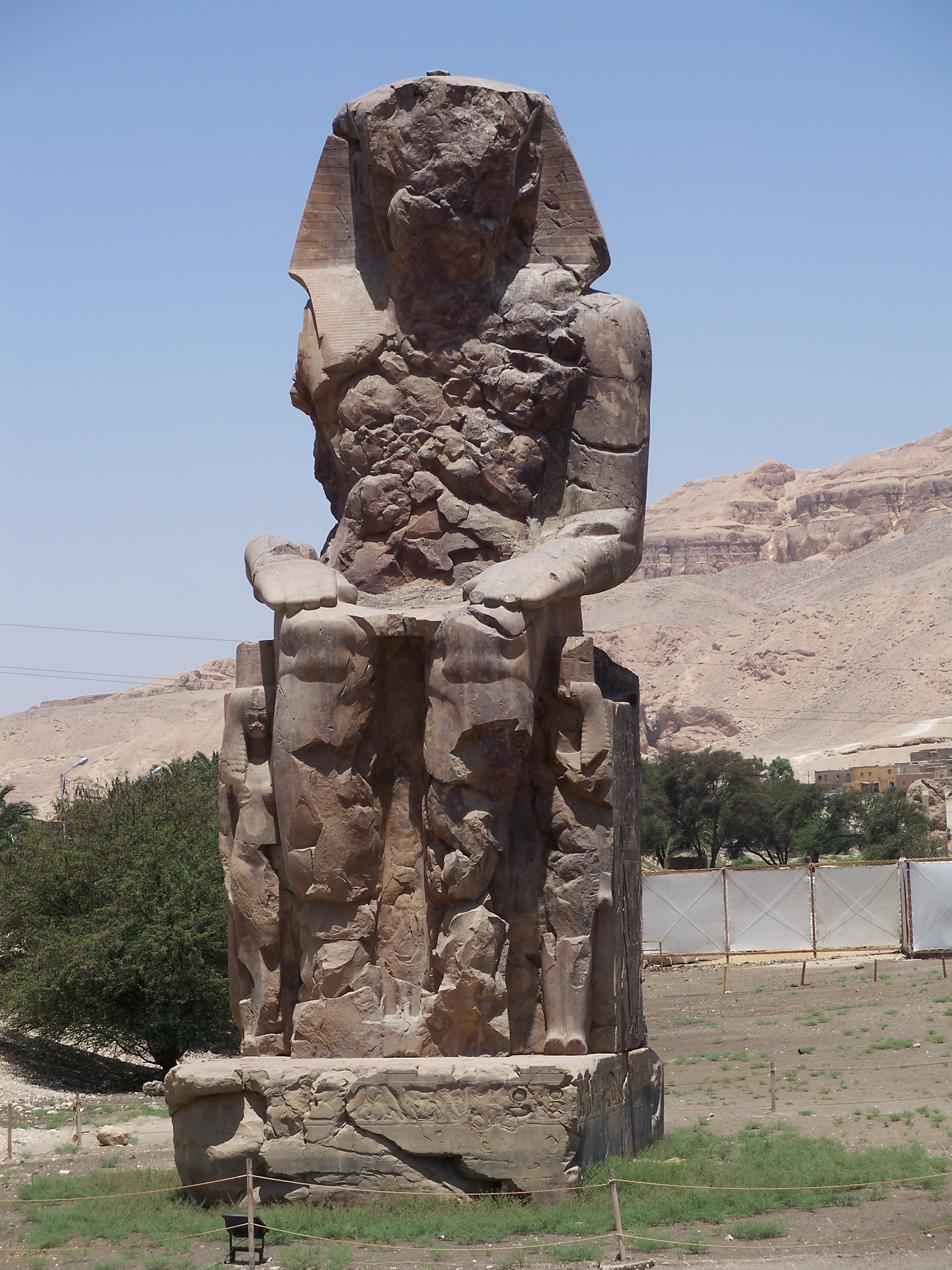
West (or south) colossus

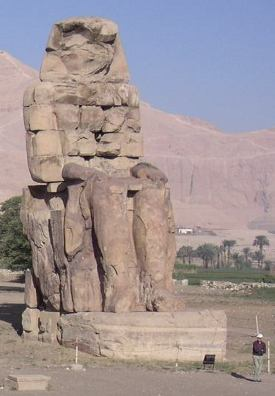
East (or north) colossus

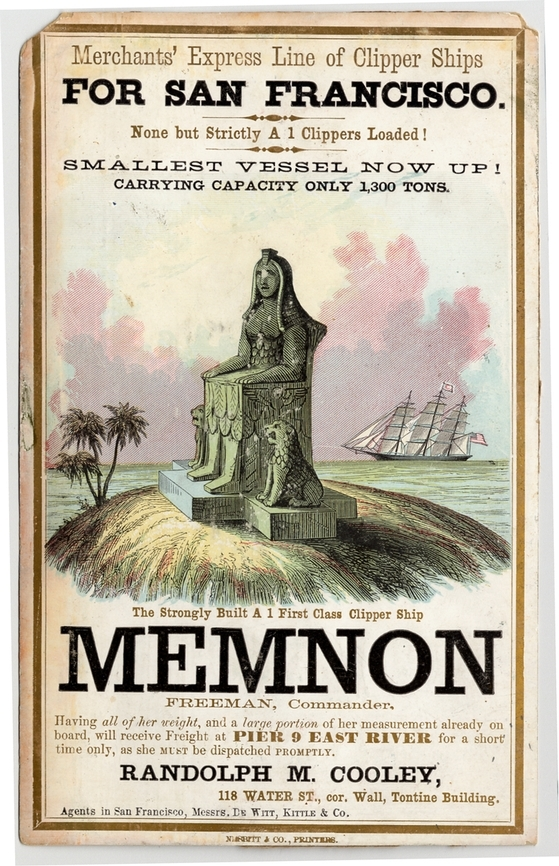
Sailing card for the clipper ship Memnon

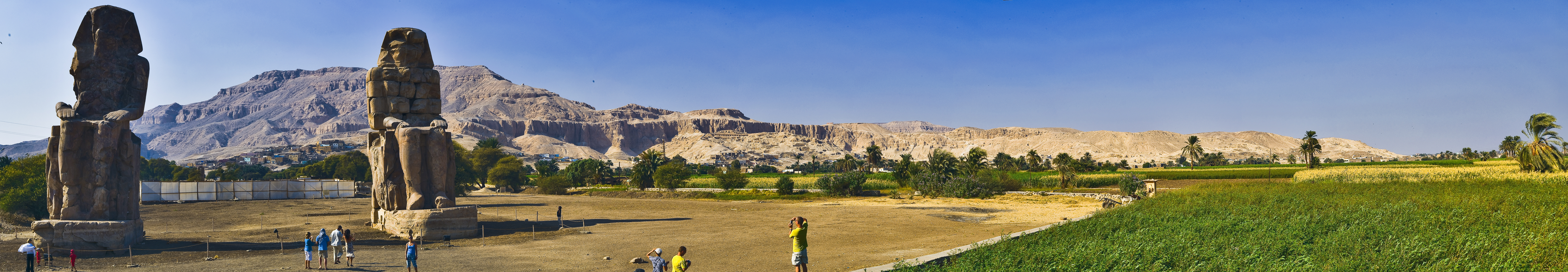
Panoramic view

=== Notable historical images ===
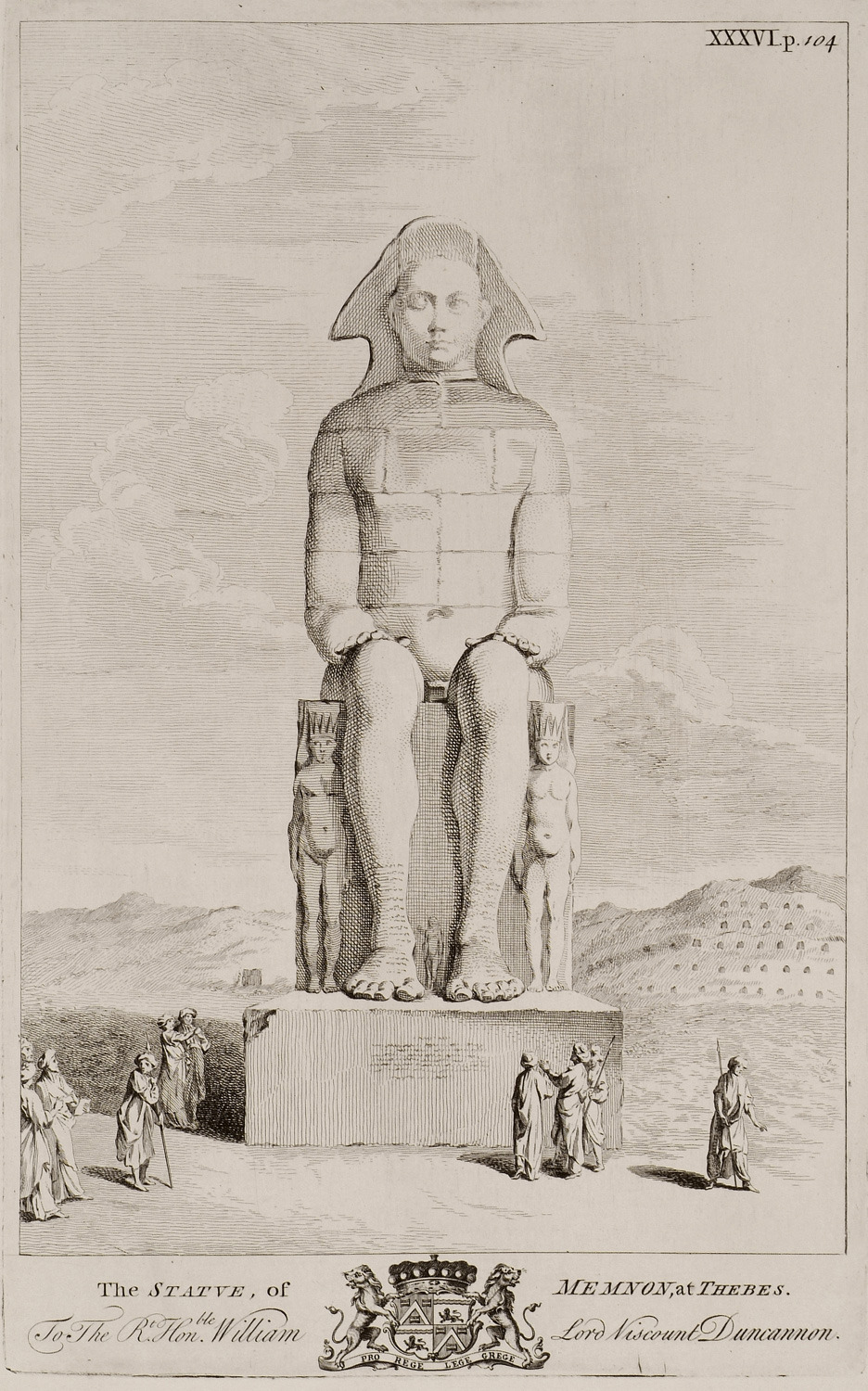
1743 by Richard Pococke

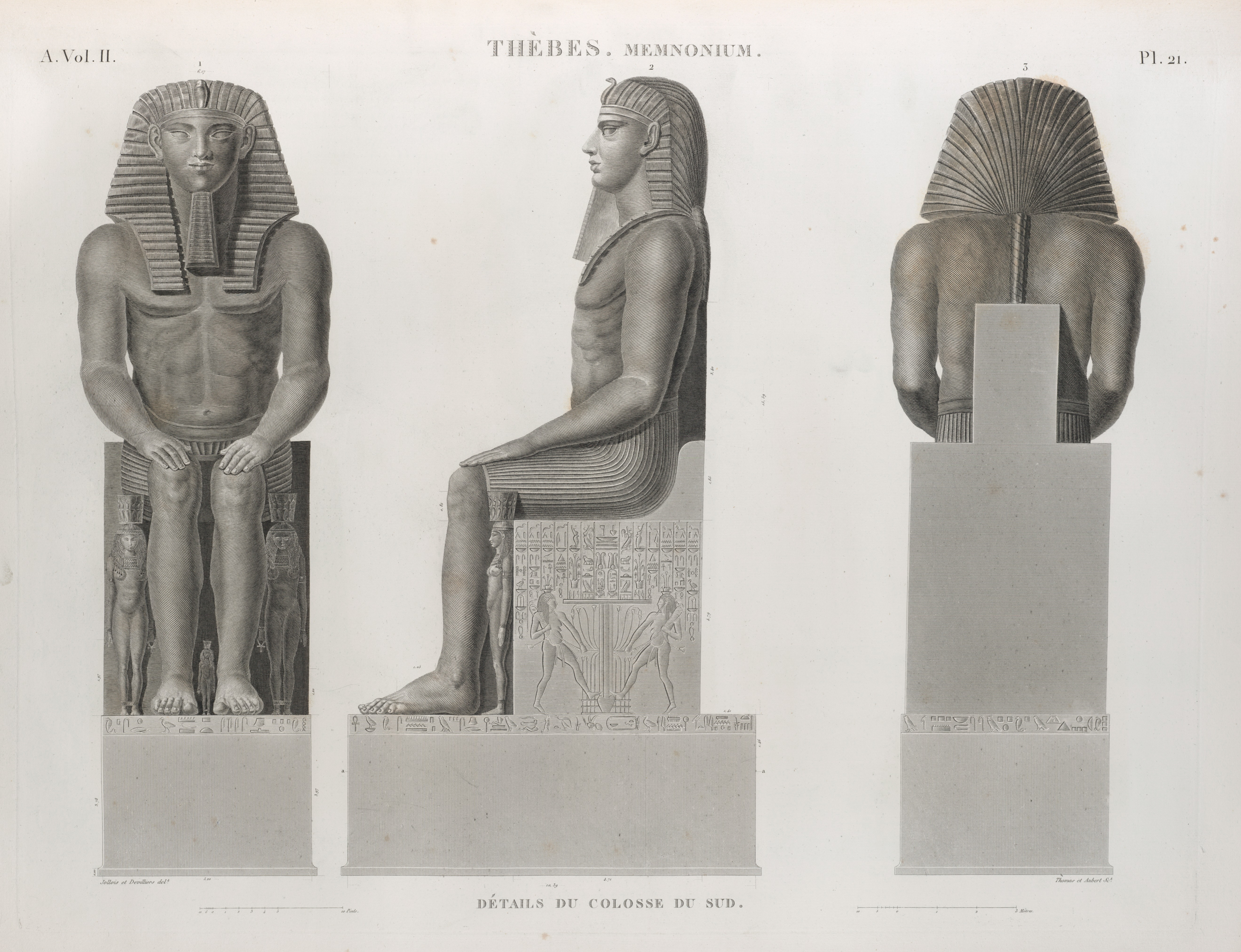
c.1800 from Description de l'Égypte

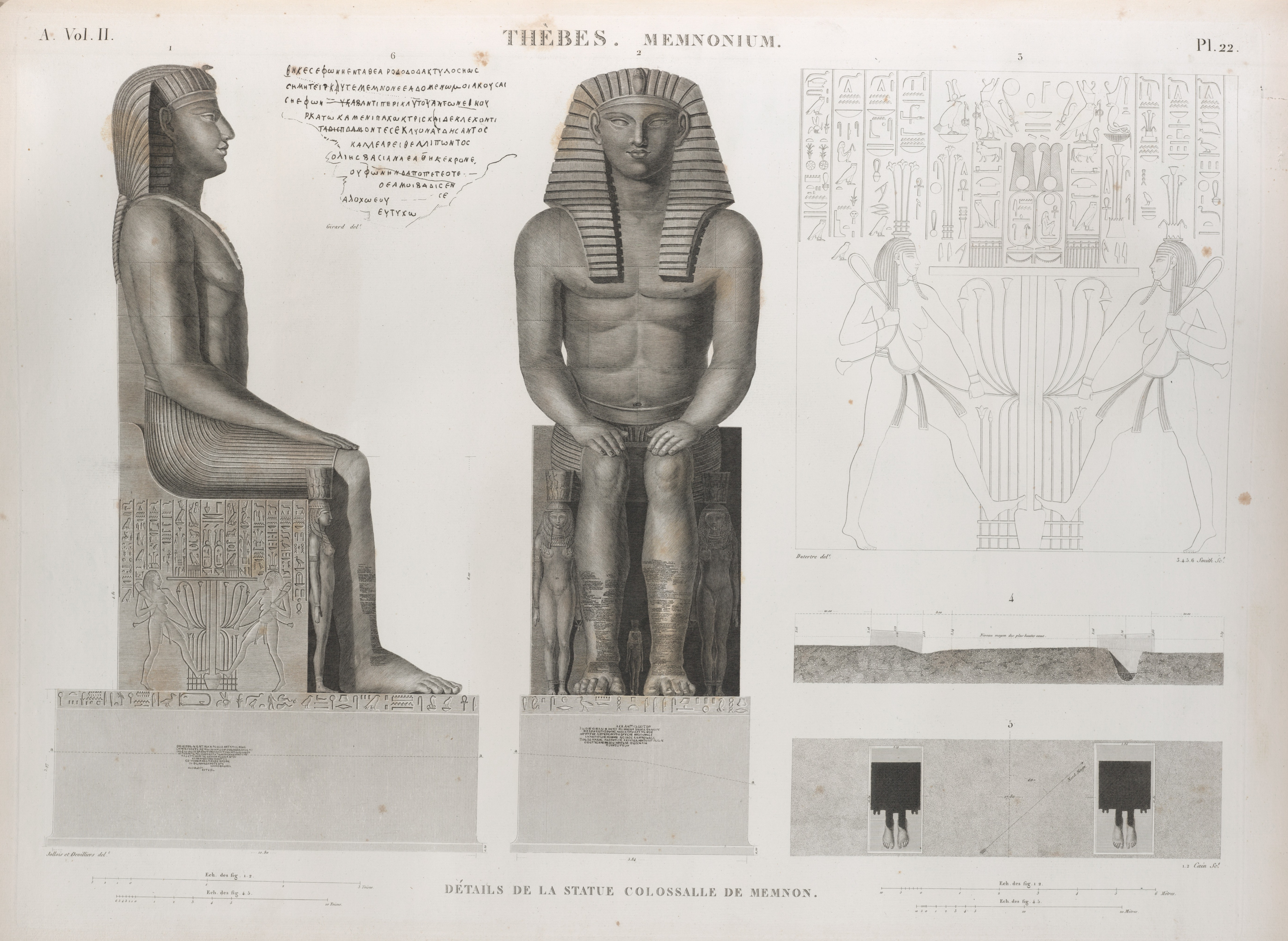
c.1800 from Description de l'Égypte, showing the inscriptions

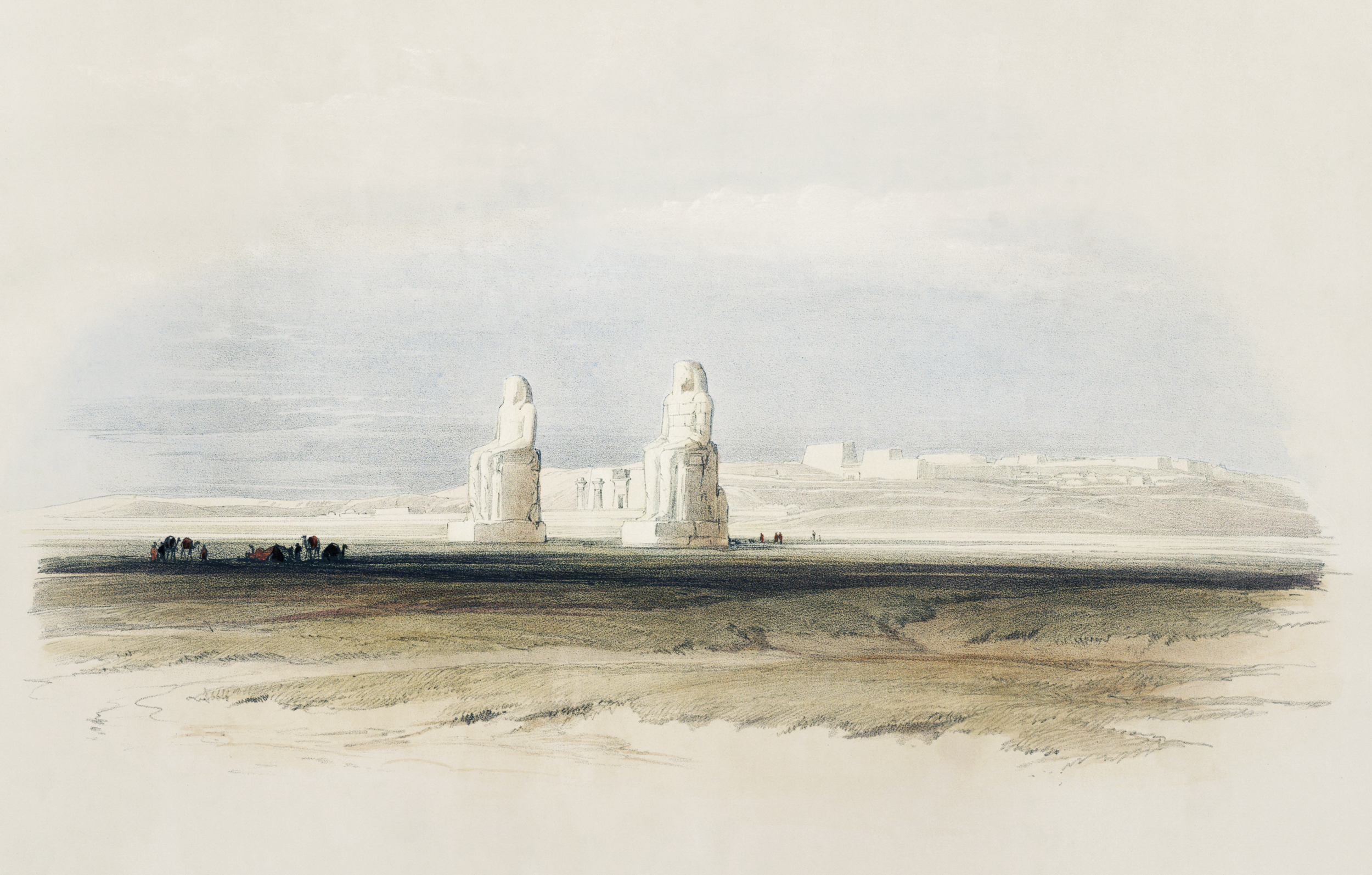
1830s from The Holy Land, Syria, Idumea, Arabia, Egypt, and Nubia

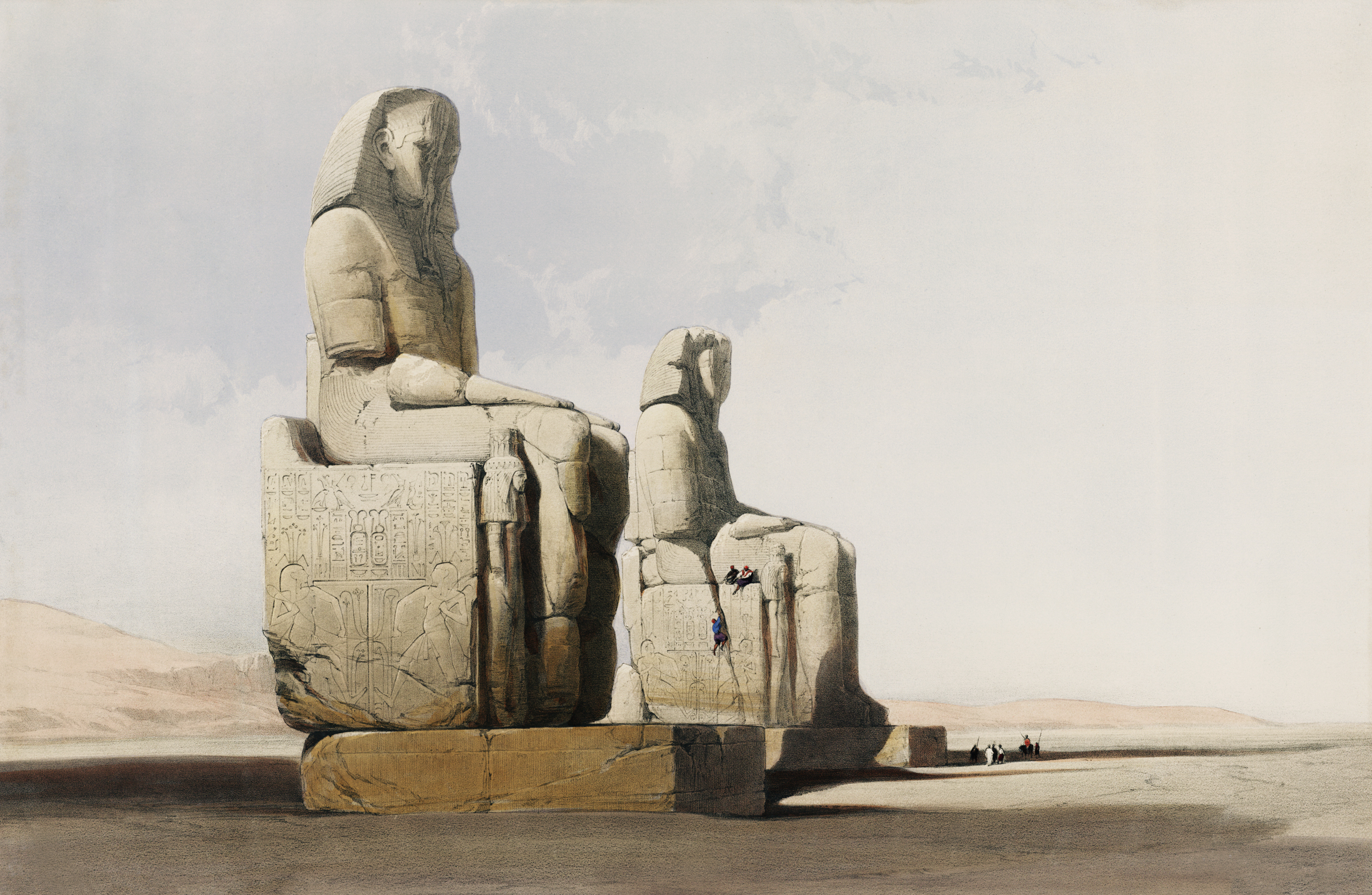
1830s from The Holy Land, Syria, Idumea, Arabia, Egypt, and Nubia

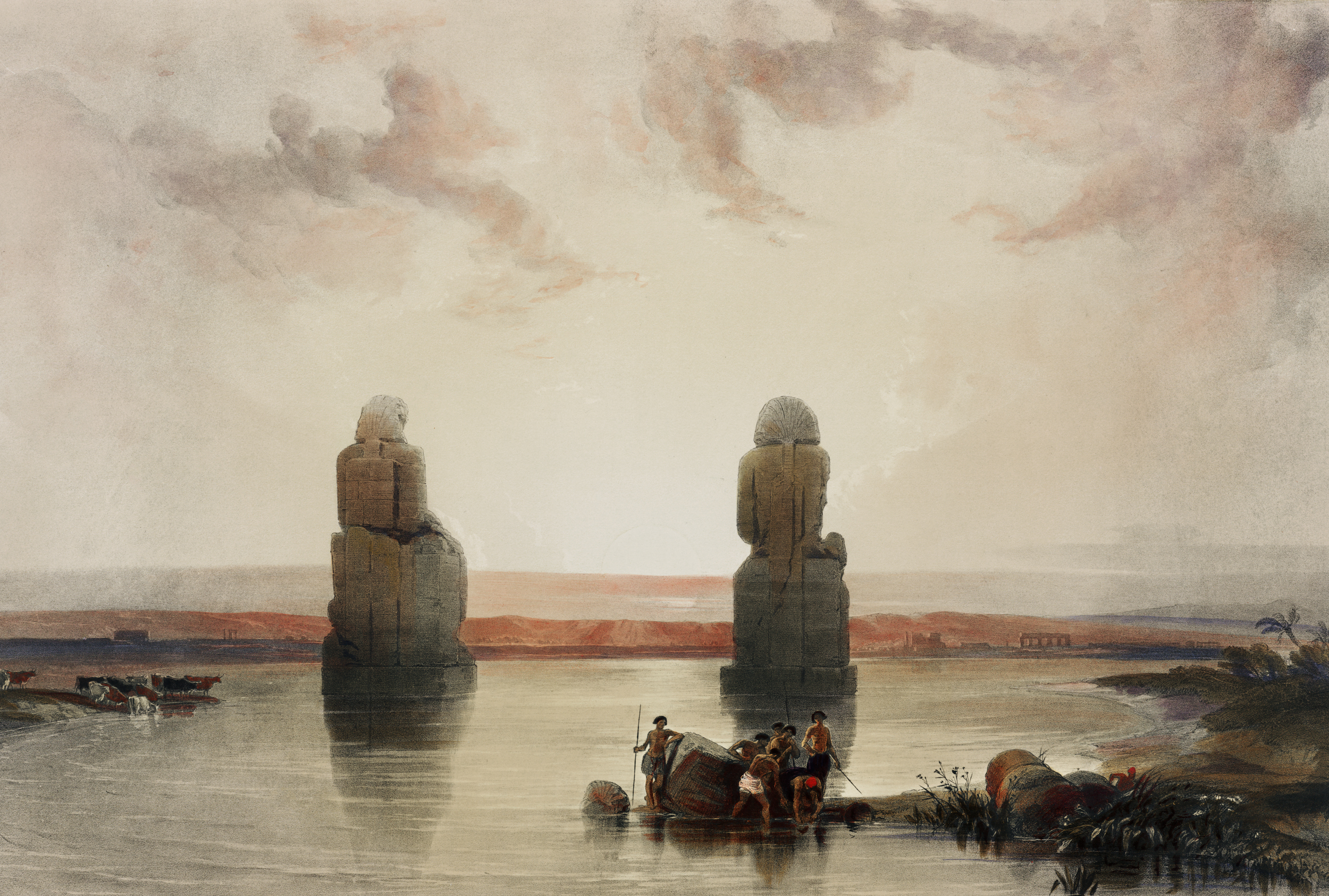
1830s from The Holy Land, Syria, Idumea, Arabia, Egypt, and Nubia

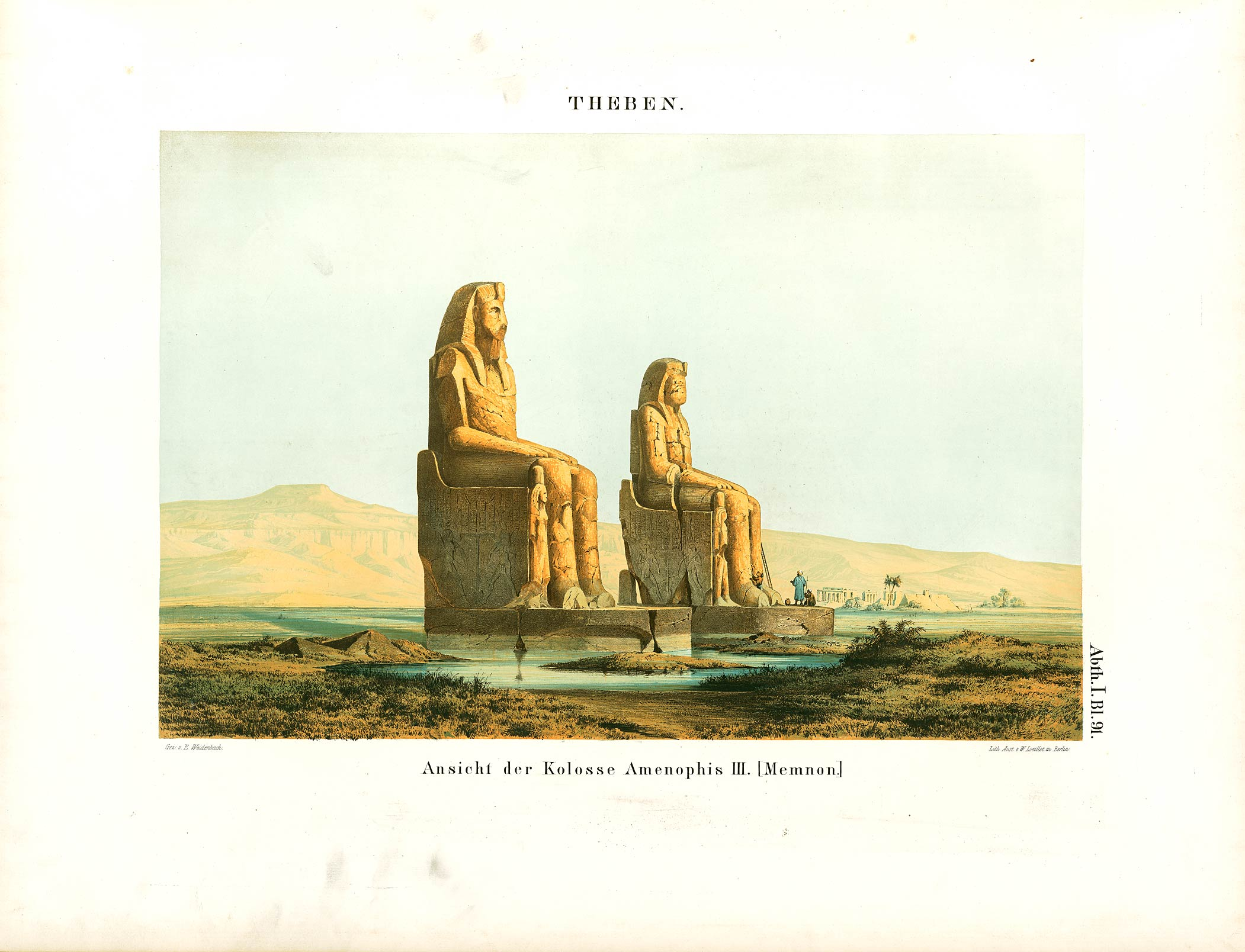
1850s in Lepsius' Denkmäler aus Ägypten und Äthiopien

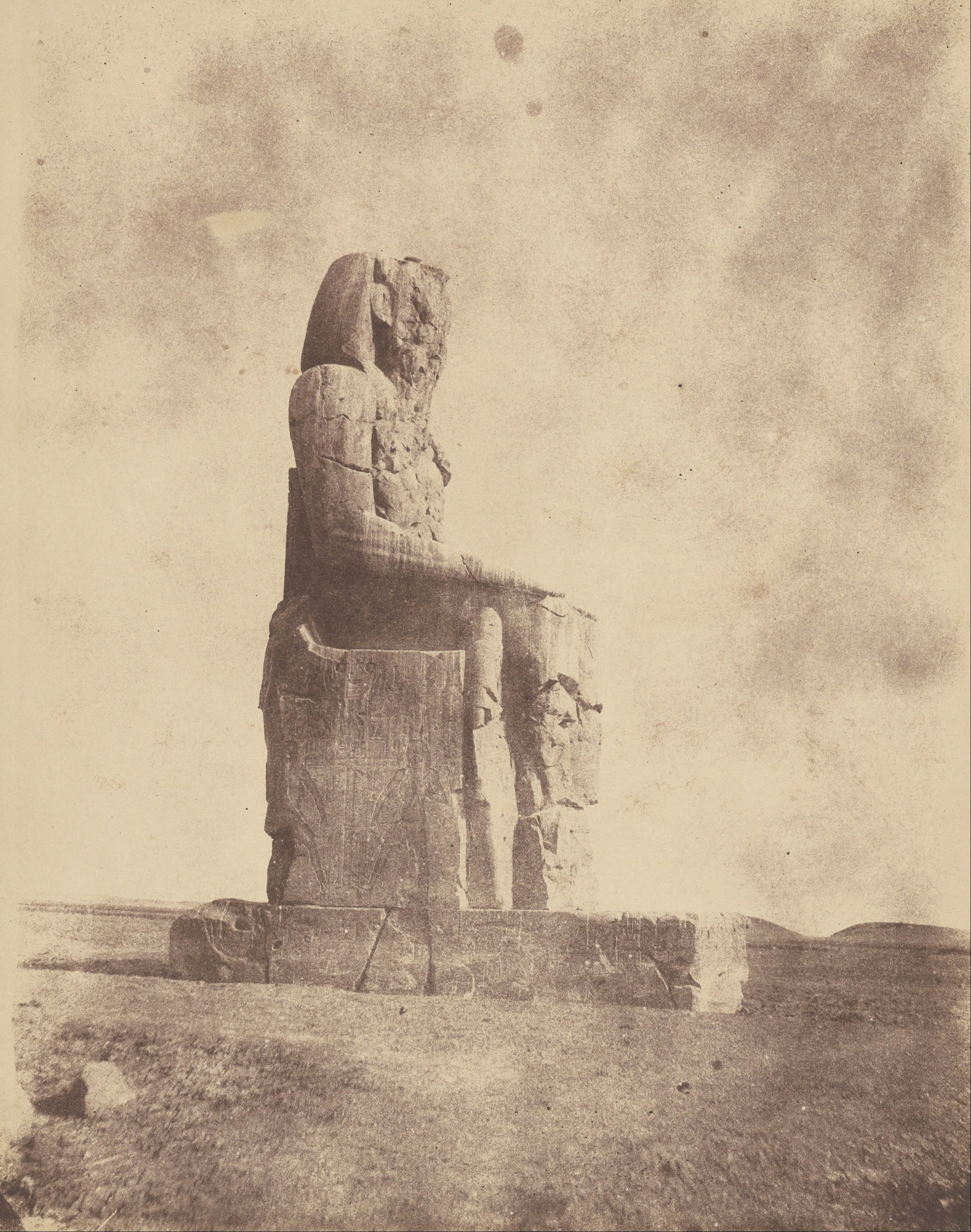
1851, first ever photographs, by John Beasley Greene

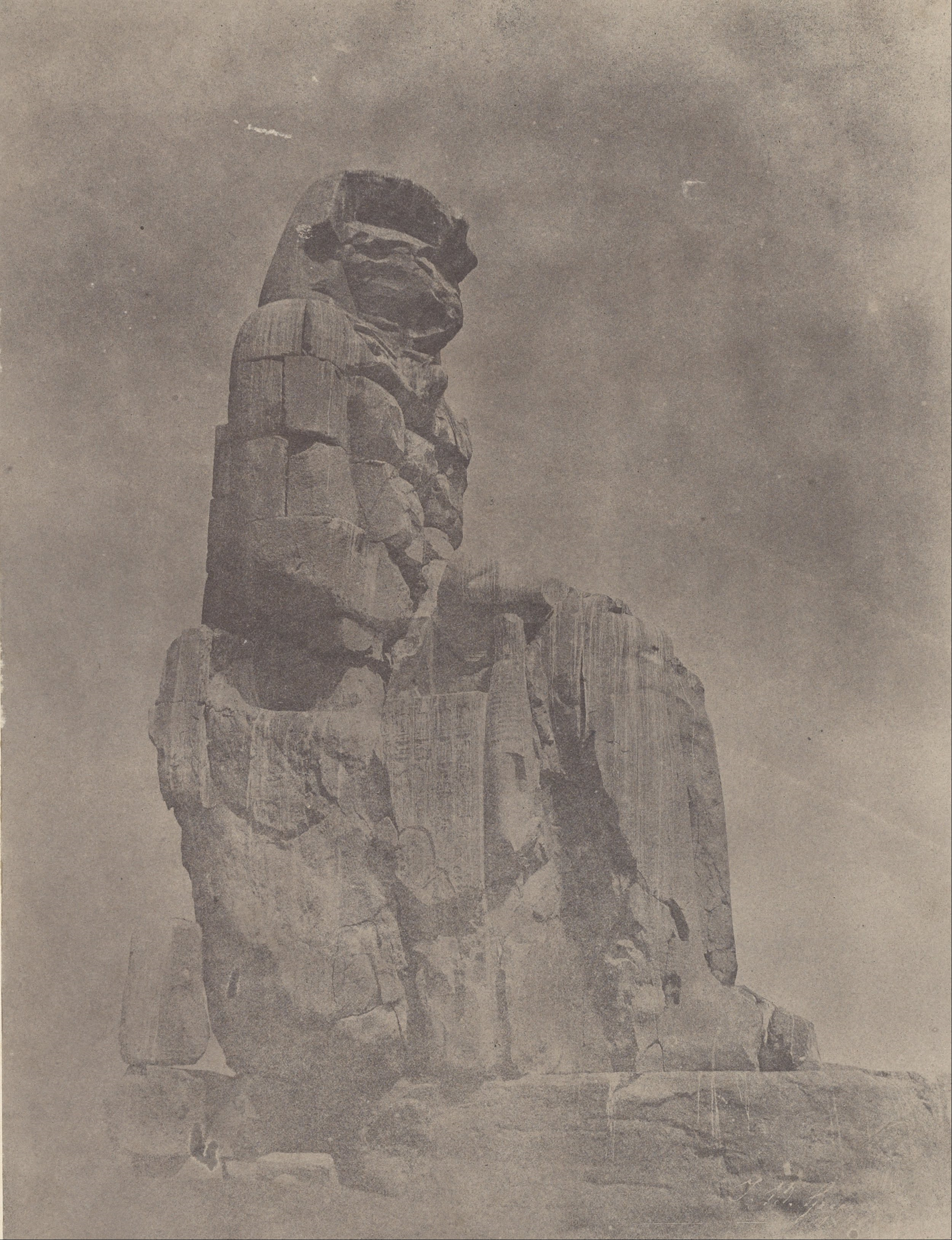
1851, first ever photographs, by John Beasley Greene

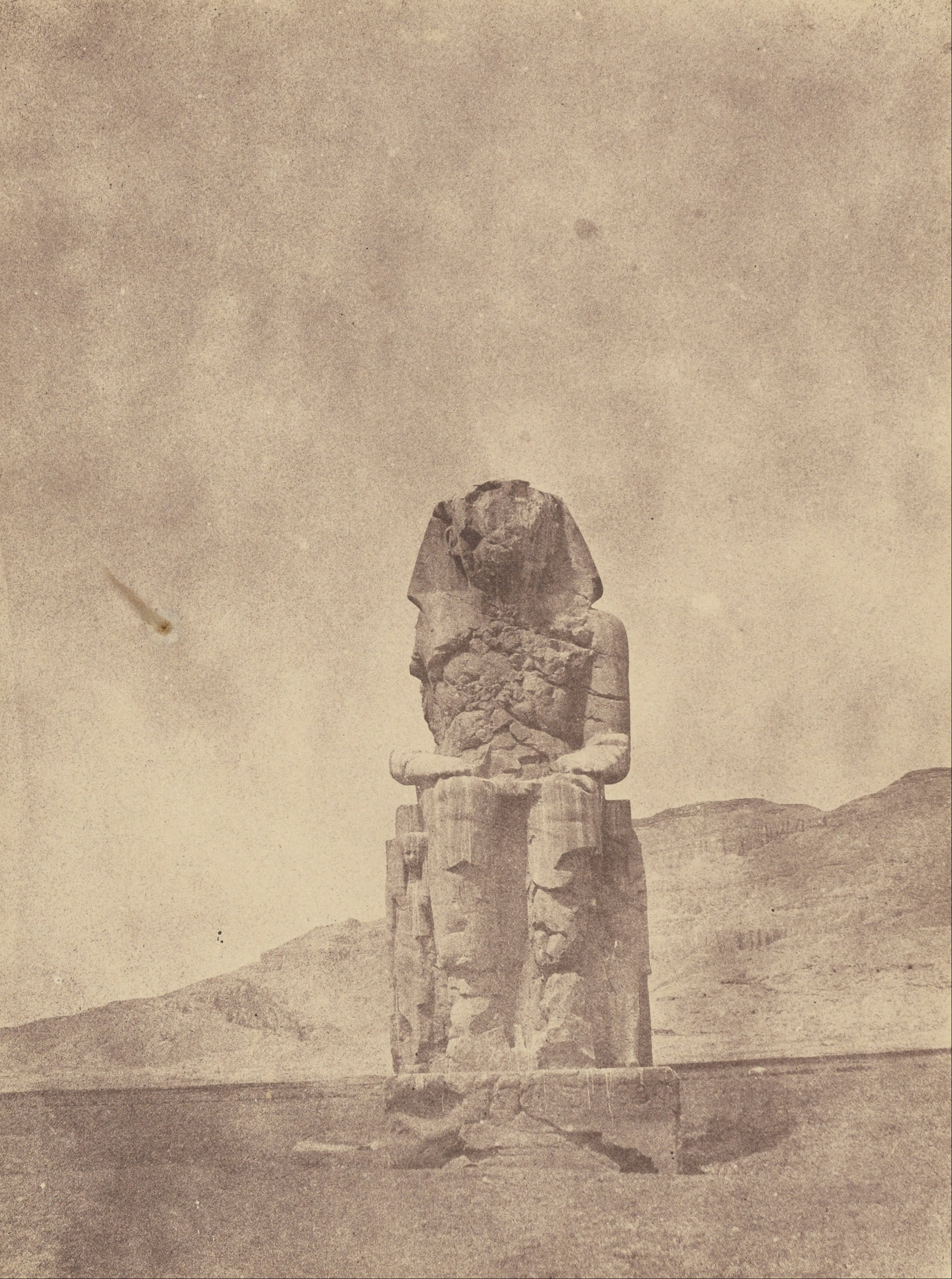
1851, first ever photographs, by John Beasley Greene

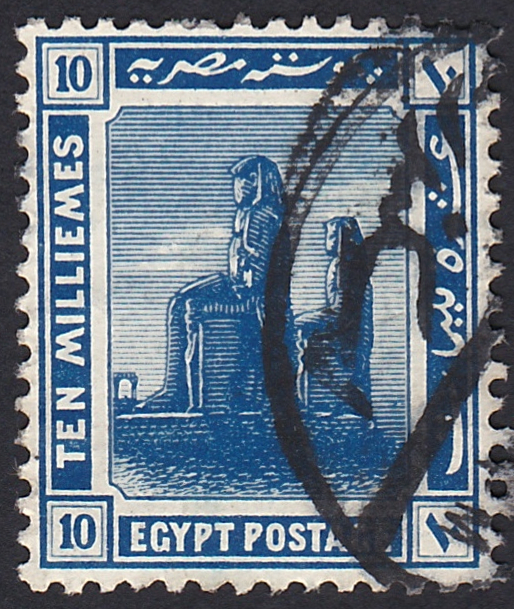
An Egyptian postage stamp

== See also ==
- Colossal red granite statue of Amenhotep III
- List of largest monoliths
