= Documentary photography =

Form of photography used to chronicle significant and historical events

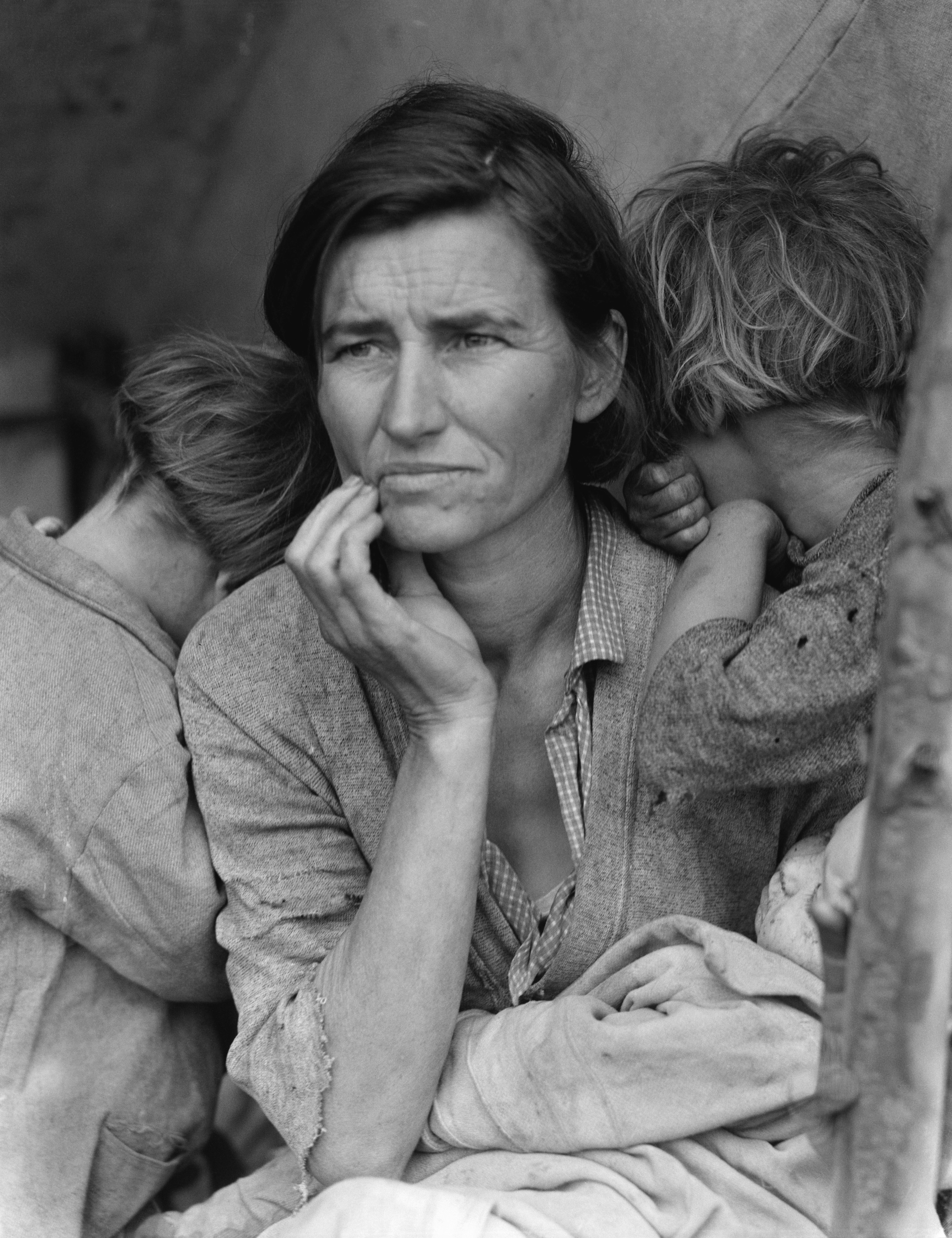
Migrant Mother (1936) by Dorothea Lange, during the Great Depression

Documentary photography usually refers to a popular form of photography used to chronicle events or environments both significant and relevant to history and historical events as well as everyday life. It is typically undertaken as professional photojournalism, or real-life reportage, but it may also be an amateur, artistic, or academic pursuit. Social documentary photography aims to draw the public's attention to social issues or to the life of underprivileged people.

== History ==
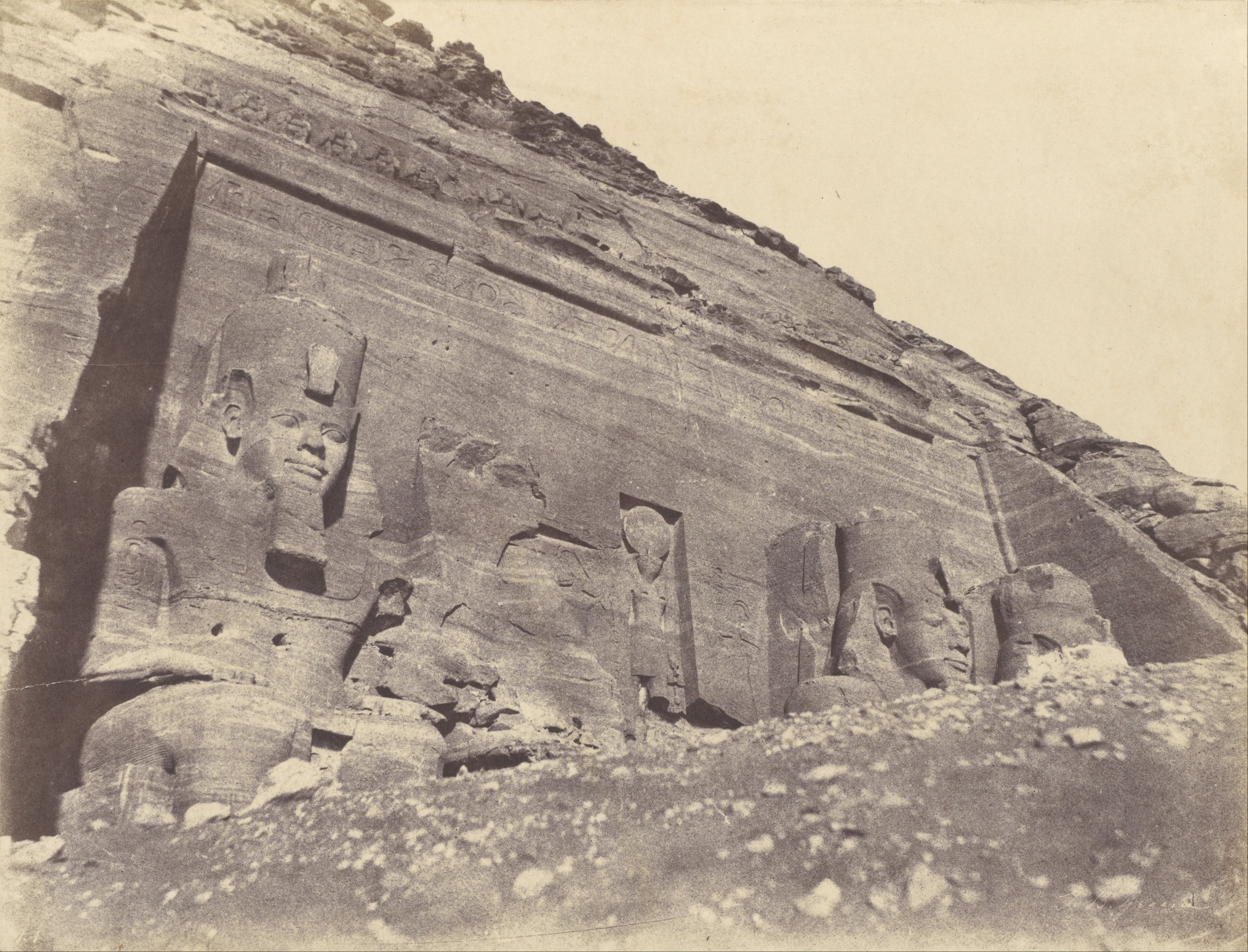
John Beasly Greene's photo of the Abu Simbel temples, 1854

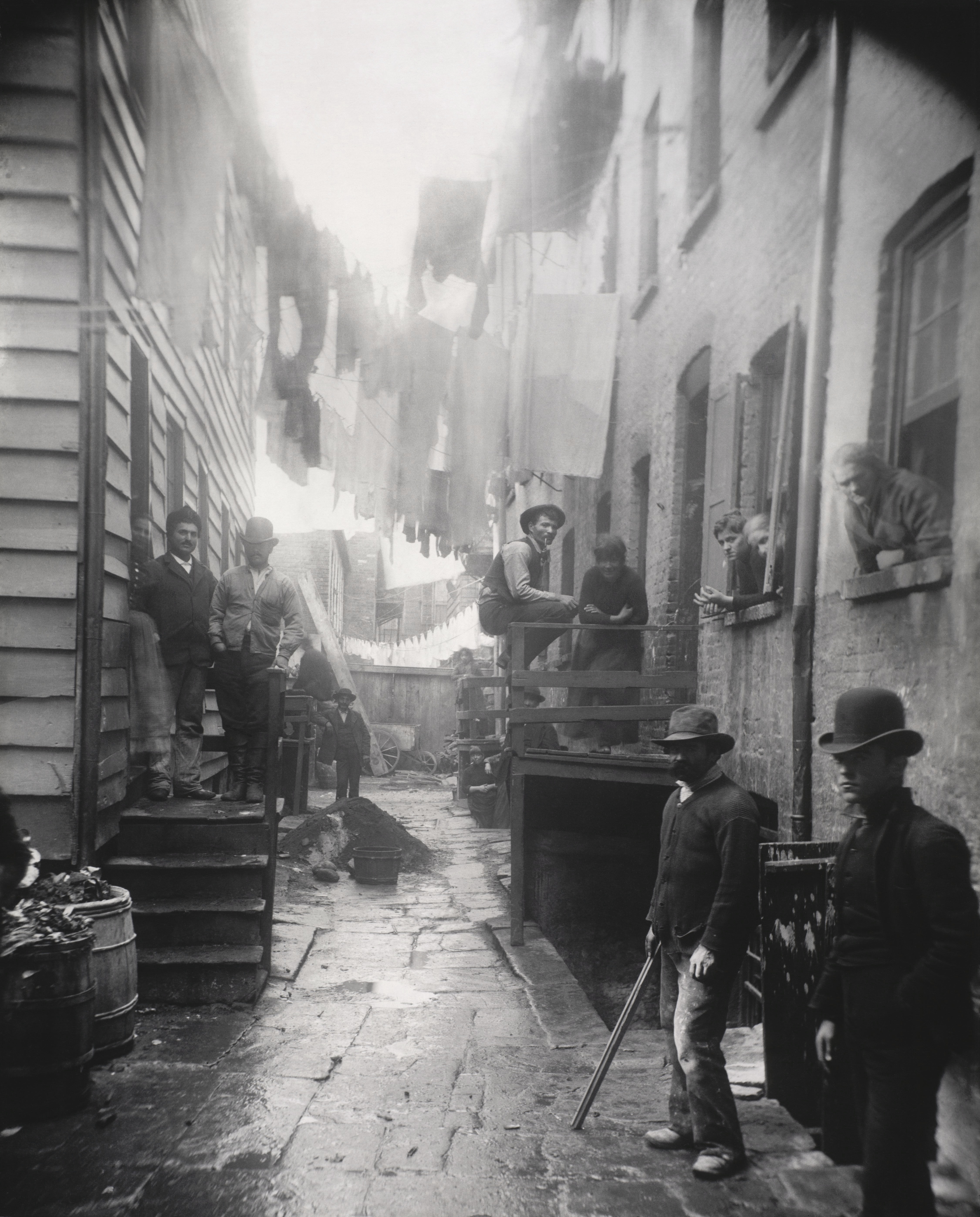
Bandit's Roost (1914) by Jacob Riis

Photographs meant to accurately describe otherwise unknown, hidden, forbidden, or difficult-to-access places or circumstances date to the earliest daguerreotype and calotype "surveys" of the ruins of the Near East, Egypt, and the American wilderness areas. Nineteenth-century archaeologist John Beasly Greene, for example, traveled to Nubia in the early 1850s to photograph the major ruins of the region. One early documentation project was the French Missions Heliographiques organized by the official Commission des Monuments historiques to develop an archive of France's rapidly disappearing architectural and human heritage; the project included such photographic luminaries as Henri Le Secq, Edouard Denis Baldus, and Gustave Le Gray.

In the United States, photographs tracing the progress of the American Civil War (1861–1865) resulted in a major archive of photographs ranging from dry records of battle sites to harrowing images of the dead by Timothy O'Sullivan and evocative images by George N. Barnard. These photographs were published by at least three groups of photographic publisher-distributors, most notably Mathew Brady and Alexander Gardner. A huge body of photography of the vast regions of the Great West was produced by official government photographers for the Geological and Geographical Survey of the Territories (a predecessor of the USGS), during the period 1868–1878, including most notably the photographers Timothy O'Sullivan and William Henry Jackson.

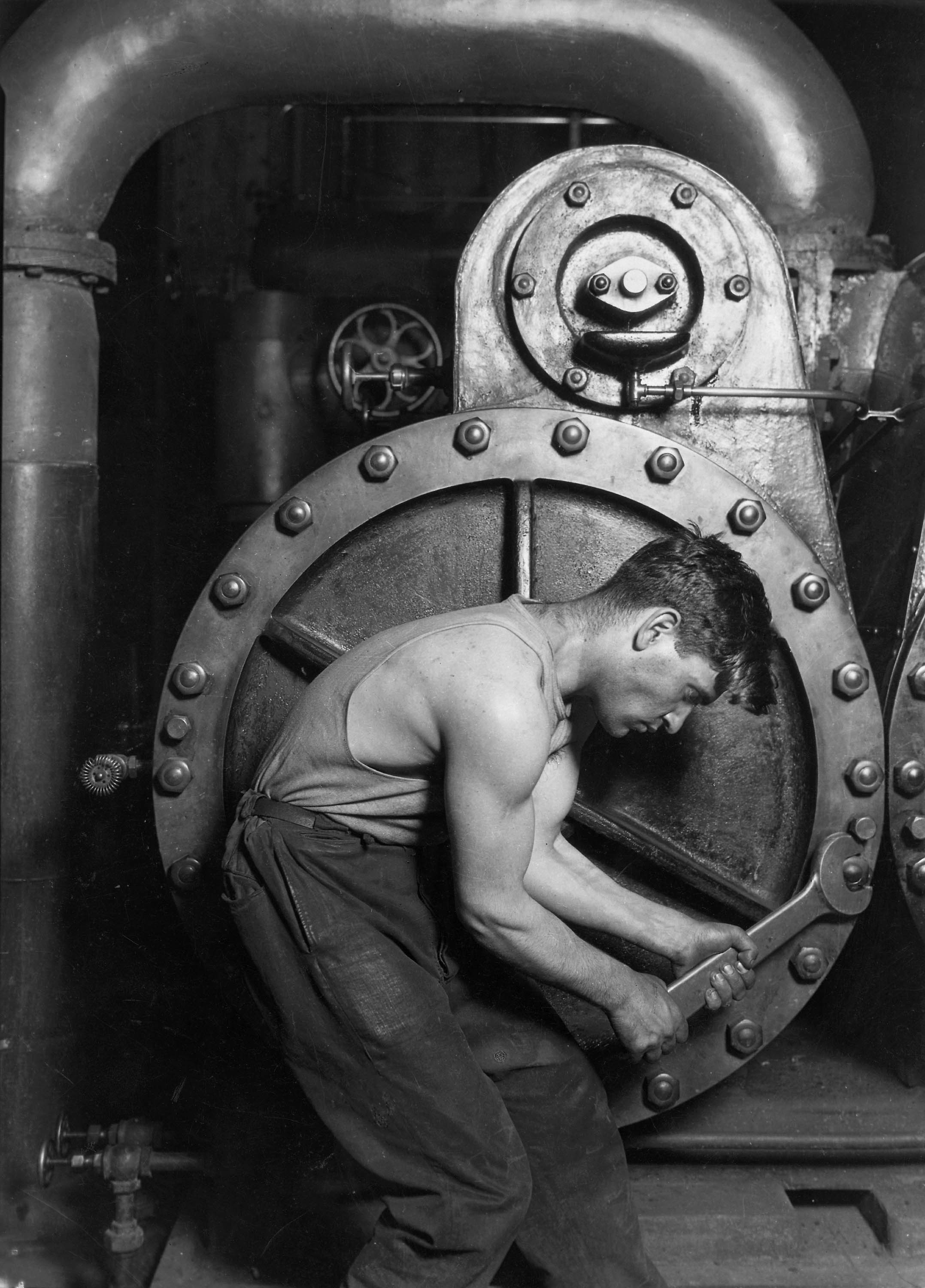
Power house mechanic working on steam pump (1920) by Lewis Hine

Both the Civil War and USGS photographic works point up an important feature of documentary photography: the production of an archive of historical significance, and the distribution to a wide audience through publication. The US Government published Survey photographs in the annual Reports, as well as portfolios designed to encourage continued funding of scientific surveys.

The development of new reproduction methods for photography provided impetus for the next era of documentary photography, in the late 1880s and 1890s, and reaching into the early decades of the 20th century. This period decisively shifted documentary from antiquarian and landscape subjects to that of the city and its crises. The refining of photogravure methods, and then the introduction of halftone reproduction around 1890 made low cost mass-reproduction in newspapers, magazines and books possible.

The figure most directly associated with the birth of this new form of documentary is the journalist and urban social reformer Jacob Riis. Riis was a New York City police-beat reporter who had been converted to urban social reform ideas by his contact with medical and public-health officials, some of whom were amateur photographers. Riis used these acquaintances at first to gather photographs, but eventually took up the camera himself. His books, most notably How the Other Half Lives of 1890 and The Children of the Slums of 1892, used those photographs. Increasingly, he also employed visual materials from a wide variety of sources, including police "mug shots" and photojournalistic images.

Riis devoted his documentary photography to changing the inhumane conditions under which the poor lived in the rapidly expanding urban-industrial centers. His work succeeded in embedding photography in urban reform movements, notably the Social Gospel and Progressive movements. His most famous successor was the photographer Lewis Wickes Hine, whose systematic surveys of conditions of child-labor in particular, made for the National Child Labor Commission and published in sociological journals like The Survey, are generally credited with strongly influencing the development of child-labor laws in New York and the United States more generally.

In Canada during the late nineteenth and early twentieth centuries, local governments adopted photography as a means to record events and evidence of local problems. Urban centres like Montreal, Toronto, and Winnipeg used photography as a tool for urban reform, documenting living conditions in downtown areas and capturing mugshots of local criminals. Canadian photojournalism took off in the early twentieth century, as newspapers and magazines adopted photographs to illustrate their publications.

In 1900, Englishwoman Alice Seeley Harris traveled to the Congo Free State with her husband, John Hobbis Harris (a missionary). There she photographed Belgian atrocities against local people with an early Kodak Brownie camera. The images were widely distributed through magic lantern screenings and were critical in changing public perceptions of slavery and eventually forcing Leopold II of Belgium to cede control of the territory to the Belgian government, creating the Belgian Congo.

In the 1930s, the Great Depression brought a new wave of documentary, both of rural and urban conditions. The Farm Security Administration, a common term for the Historical Division, supervised by Roy Stryker, funded legendary photographic documentarians, including Walker Evans, Dorothea Lange, Russell Lee, John Vachon, and Marion Post Wolcott among others. This generation of documentary photographers is generally credited for codifying the documentary code of accuracy mixed with impassioned advocacy, with the goal of arousing public commitment to social change.

During the wartime and postwar eras, documentary photography increasingly became subsumed under the rubric of photojournalism. Swiss-American photographer Robert Frank is generally credited with developing a counterstrain of more personal, evocative, and complex documentary, exemplified by his work in the 1950s, published in the United States in his 1959 book, The Americans. In the early 1960s, his influence on photographers like Garry Winogrand and Lee Friedlander resulted in an important exhibition at the Museum of Modern Art (MoMA), which brought those two photographers together with their colleague Diane Arbus under the title, New Documents. MoMA curator John Szarkowski proposed in that exhibition that a new generation, committed not to social change but to formal and iconographical investigation of the social experience of modernity, had replaced the older forms of social documentary photography.

In the 1970s and 1980s, a spirited attack on traditional documentary was mounted by historians, critics, and photographers. One of the most notable was the photographer-critic Allan Sekula, whose ideas and the accompanying bodies of pictures he produced, influenced a generation of "new new documentary" photographers, whose work was philosophically more rigorous, often more stridently leftist in its politics. Sekula emerged as a champion of these photographers, in critical writing and editorial work. Notable among this generation are the photographers Fred Lonidier, whose 'Health and Safety Game" of 1976 became a model of post-documentary, and Martha Rosler, whose "The Bowery in Two Inadequate Descriptive Systems" of 1974-75 served as a milestone in the critique of classical humanistic documentary as the work of privileged elites imposing their visions and values on the dis-empowered.

Since the late 1990s, an increased interest in documentary photography and its longer-term perspective can be observed. Nicholas Nixon extensively documented issues surrounded by American life. South African documentary photographer Pieter Hugo engaged in documenting art traditions with a focus on African communities. Antonin Kratochvil photographed a wide variety of subjects, including Mongolia's street children for the Museum of Natural History. Fazal Sheikh sought to reflect the realities of the most underprivileged peoples of different third world countries.

== Documentary photography vs. photojournalism ==
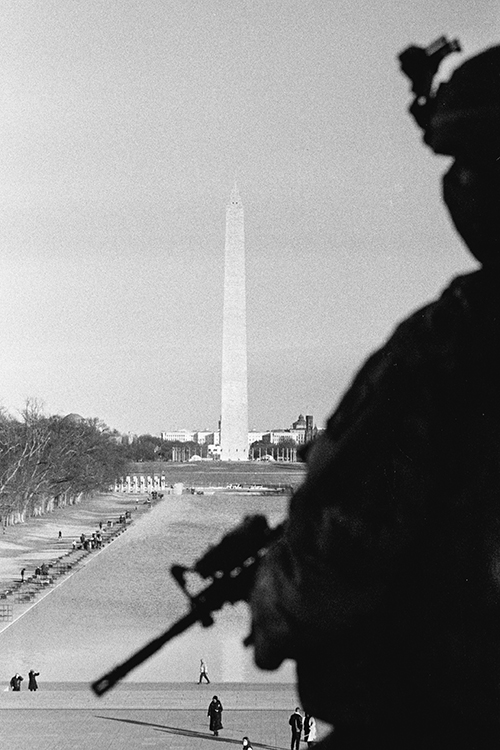
Contemporary documentary photography: National Guardsman in Washington D.C. (2021), during the Inauguration of Joe Biden.

Documentary photography and photojournalism are similar methods of photography, as both are considered realistic representations of the world.

Documentary photography generally relates to longer-term projects with a more complex storyline, while photojournalism is more commonly associated with breaking news stories. The two approaches often overlap. Some theorists argue that photojournalism, with its close relationship to the news media, is influenced to a greater degree than documentary photography by the need to entertain audiences and market products.

== Acceptance by the art world ==
The art worlds opinion of this type of photography changed markedly in 1967 during curator John Szarkowski's New Documents exhibition at Museum of Modern Art.

Since the late 1970s, the decline of magazine-published photography has led to the vanishing of traditional forums for such work. Many documentary photographers have now focused on the art world and galleries as a way of presenting their work and making a living. Traditional documentary photography has found a place in dedicated photography galleries alongside other artists working in painting, sculpture, and modern media.

== See also ==
- Black and White Photography
- Conservation photography
- Raw View magazine
- Street photography

== Sources ==
- "A New History of Photography" Könemann Verlagsgesellschaft/Michel Frizot 1998
- "Down the Line; Light Rail's First Day; Getting off on the right track"; Star Tribune, June 27, 2004.
- "Photography in Canada, 1839-1989: An Illustrated History" by Sarah Bassnett and Sarah Parsons, 2023. Art Canada Institute.
