= Raw View =

Finnish photography magazine

- Editor-in-chief: Hannamari Shakya
- Founded: 2007
- Final issue: November 2017
- Company: Soul Creations
- Country: Finland
- Based in: Helsinki
- Language: English
- Website: www.photoraw.org
- ISSN: 2342-5091

Raw View was a magazine of documentary photography. It was established in 2007 as Photo Raw and obtained its current title in November 2014. The editor-in-chief was Hannamari Shakya who works as a producer at the publishing company Musta Taide of Aalto University producing photography books.

Raw View was published by Soul Creations in both Finnish and English.

The last issue was released in November 2017. According to the press release, there was a demand for the magazine, but the financial challenges were too much in the end. Publisher Soul Creations continues with publishing photography books. The tenth and last issue was dedicated to Finland.

== Awards ==
- Quality Prize for Culture magazines 2009 by Ministry of Culture, Finland

== Books ==
- Side/Bond, together with Musta Taide, the publishing company of Aalto University producing photography books
