= El-Gabal el-Ahmar =

Mountain

Coordinates: 30.0456113°N 31.3080056°E

El-Gabal el-Ahmar (Arabic: الجبل الأحمر) is a quarry located today within the boundaries of modern-day Cairo, near Nasr City. The name means "The Red Hill". The site was in full production in the times of Akhenaton, Amenhophis III, Tutankhamon and Ramses III. The quarry was directed by Huy, also known as "Chief of the King's Works" and also by Hori.

The famous Colossi of Memnon are made from blocks of quartzite sandstone suspected to be quarried at El-Gabal el-Ahmar.

Typical minerals known from this site:

- Celestine, Quartzite or red sandstone.
