= John Beasley Greene =

American archaeologist and photographer (1832–1856)

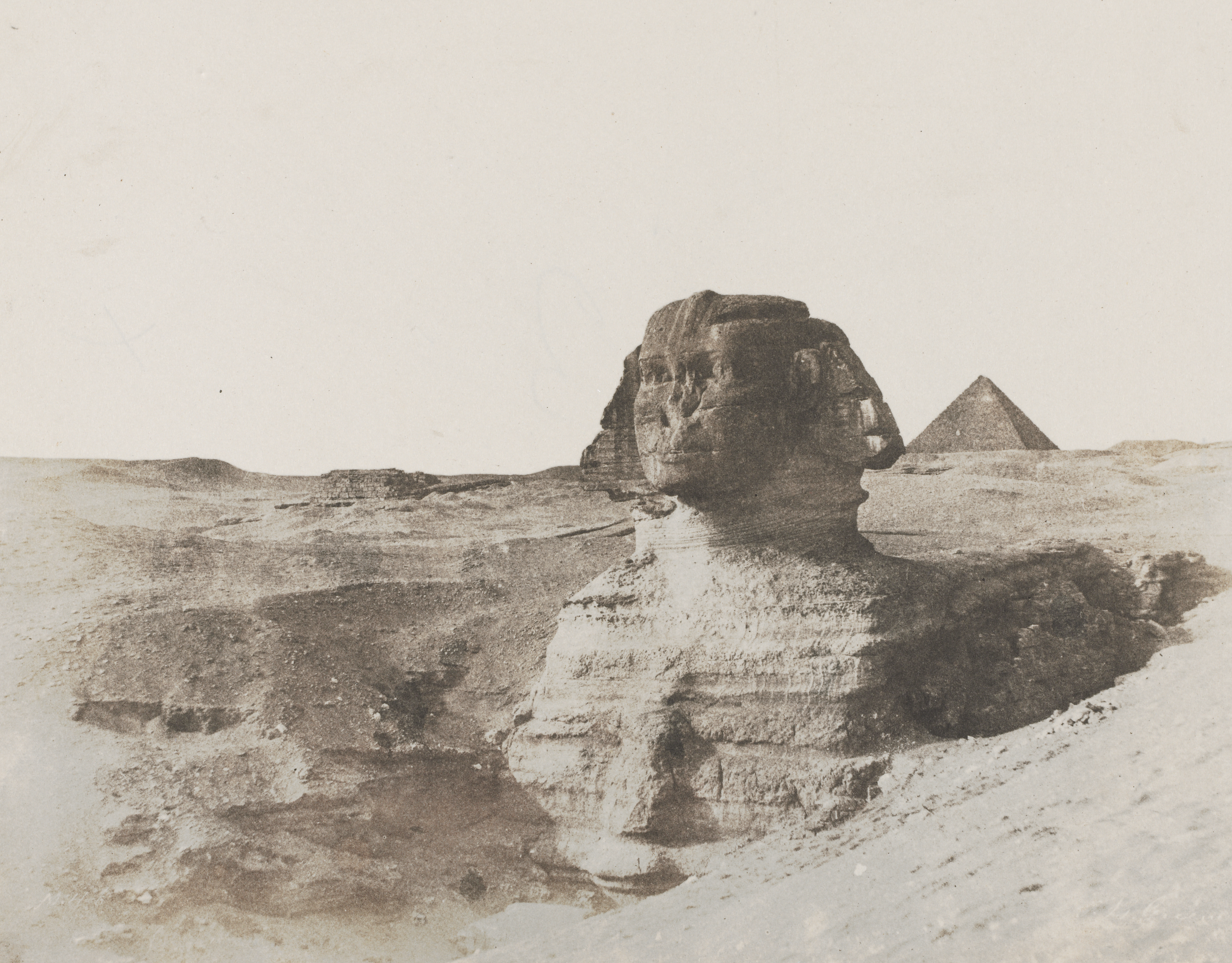
The Sphinx by Egyptologist and photographer John Beasley Greene, ca.1853

John Beasley Greene (1832 – November 1856) was a French-born American Egyptologist and one of the earliest archaeological documentary photographers. He died at the age of 24. Because of his early demise, his pioneering work was quickly forgotten. The first important study of Greene was published in 1981.

== Biography ==
The son of an American banker, Greene was born in Le Havre and later lived in at 10 rue de la Grange Bateliere in the 9th arrondissement of Paris.

His work combined two passions: the new technology of photography and the discovery of Ancient Egypt. He employed a waxed paper negative process learned from Gustave Le Gray.

After his father's death in 1850, Greene was able to finance his first trip to Egypt in 1854.

He was a founding member of the Société française de photographie, founded on 15 November 1854. That same year, he published photographs from his expedition under the title, Le Nil : monuments, paysages, explorations photographiques.

In Algeria, on his second trip in late 1855 and early 1856, he photographed excavation campaigns of the Royal Mausoleum of Mauretania in Algeria, led by Louis-Adrien Berbrugger.

He died in Cairo, possibly of tuberculosis, at the age of 24.

=== Gallery ===
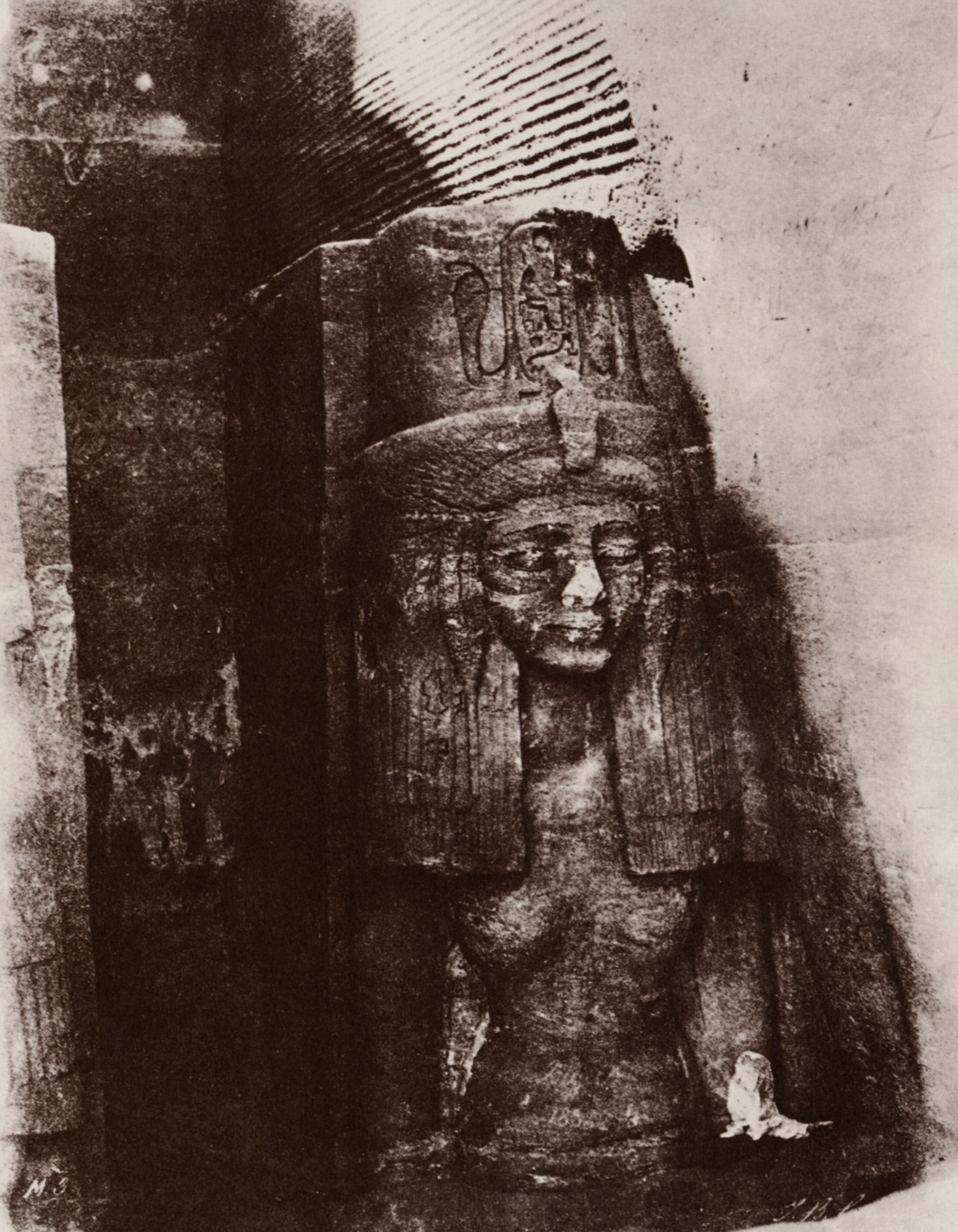
Ramses II (ca 1853)

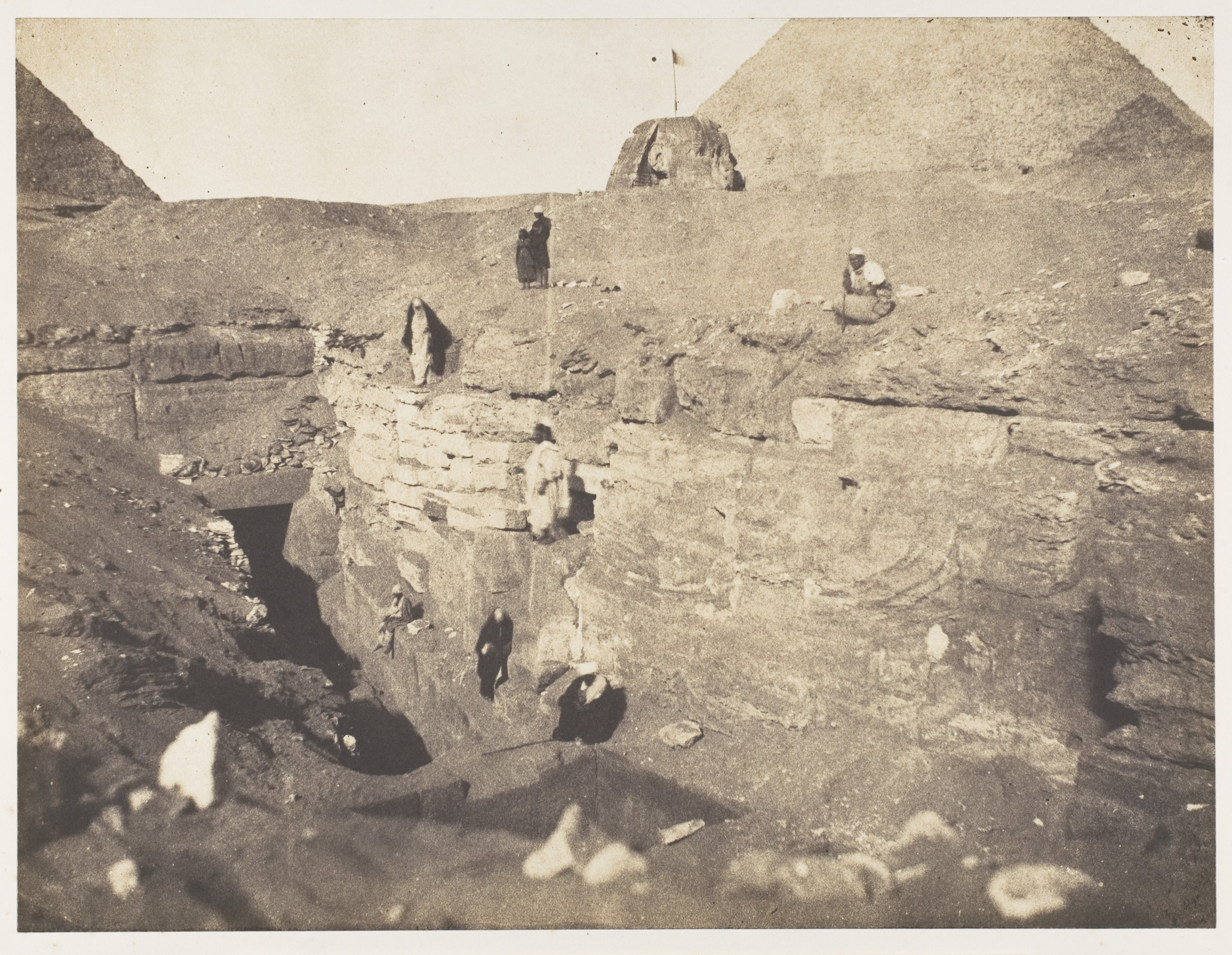
Excavations near the Sphinx (1853)

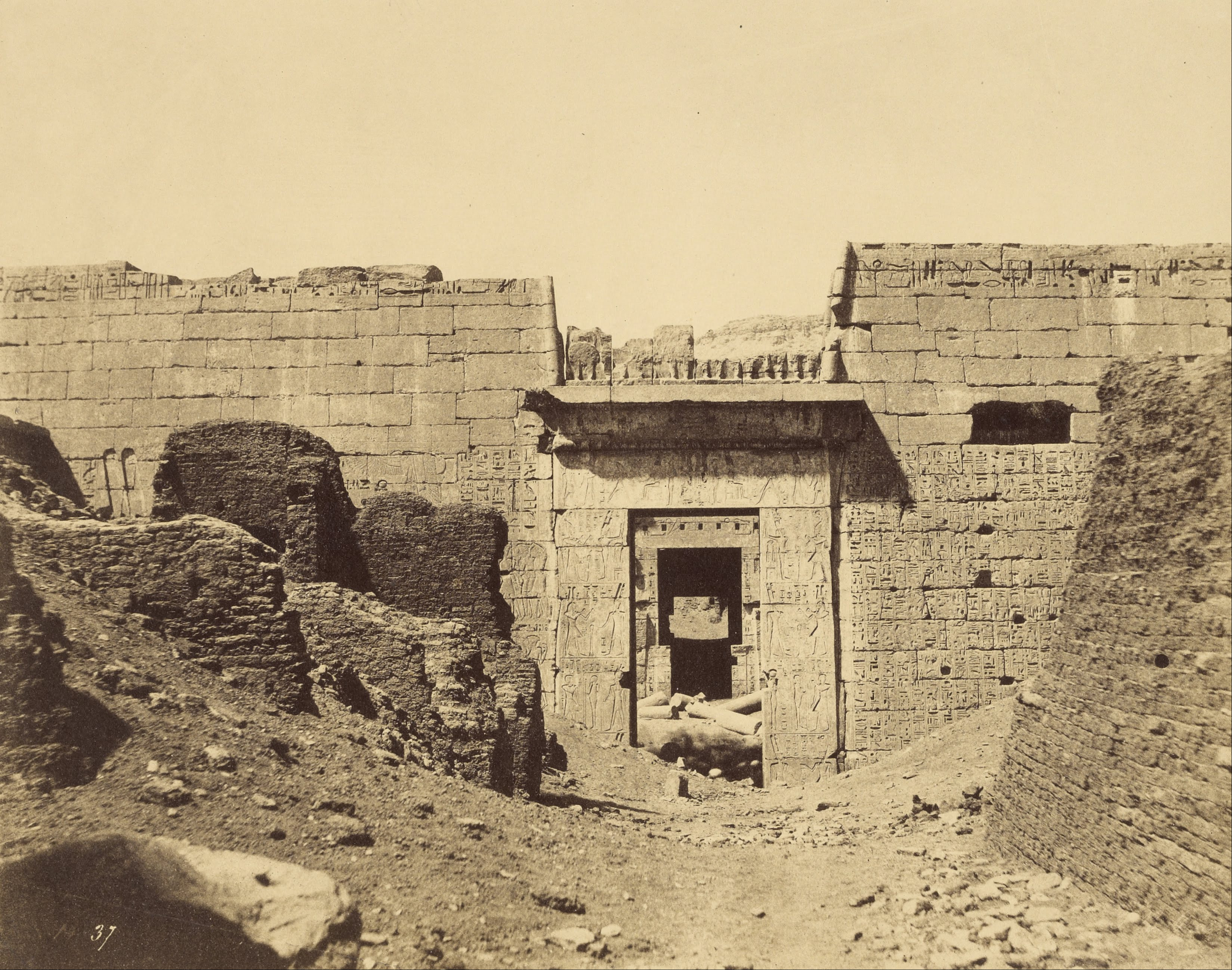
Médinet-Habou, Palais de Ramsès Méïamoun, Entrée de La Seconde Cour (1854)

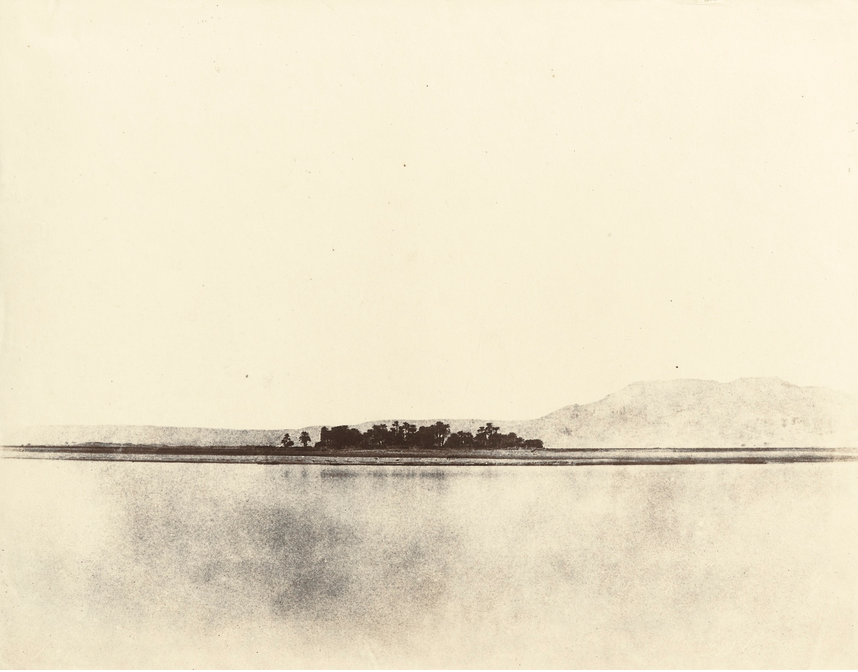
Thèbes, Village de Ghezireh (1853-1853)

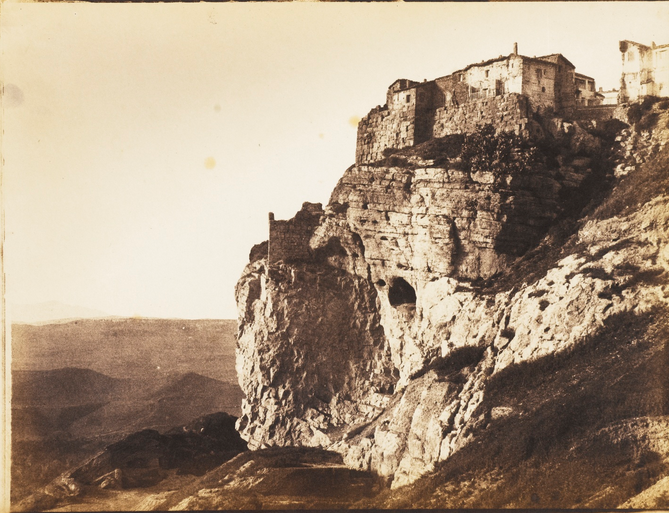
Constantine, Algeria (ca. 1855)

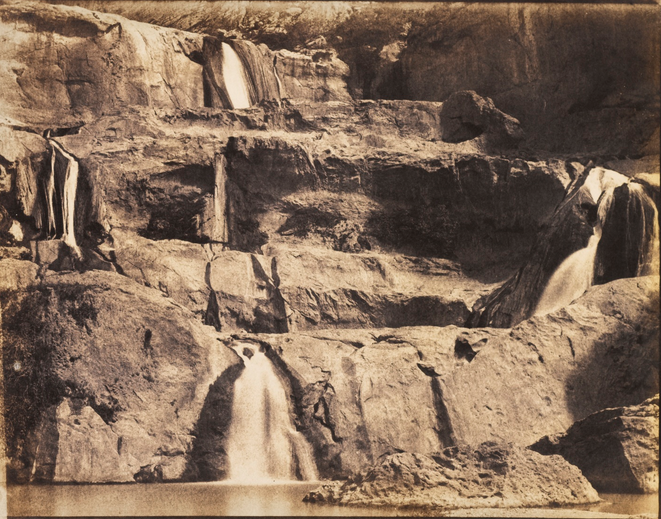
Cascade d'El-Ourit, Tlemcen, Algeria (1856)

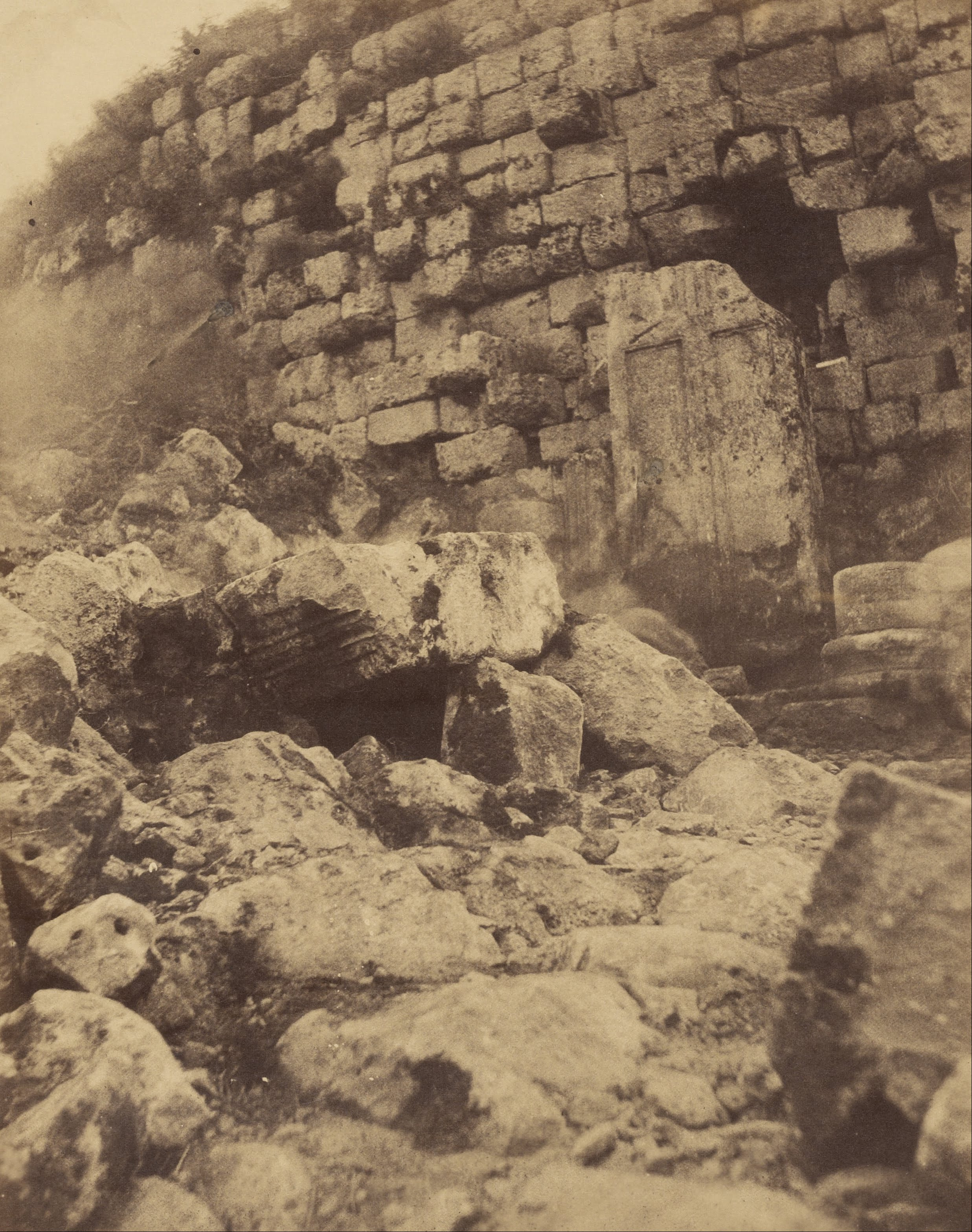
Royal Mausoleum of Mauretania 1856

== Exhibitions ==
The San Francisco Museum of Modern Art hosted an exhibition titled "Signs and Wonders: The Photographs of John Beasley Greene" (31 August 2019 – 5 January 2020).

== Publications ==
- Le Nil : monuments, paysages, explorations photographiques, Lille, Imprimerie photographique de Blanquart-Évrard, 1854.
- Fouilles Executées à Thèbes dans l'année 1855
- Photographes en Algérie au XIXe siècle. Paris

== Collections ==
- Bibliothèque de l'institut
- Cabinet des estampes de la BNF
- Smithsonian American Art Museum
- Musée de l'Élysée, Lausanne
- George Eastman House
- San Francisco Museum of Modern Art
- Art Institute of Chicago
