= Fred Lonidier =

American photographer (born 1942)

Fred Lonidier (born 1942) is an American photographer.

== Life ==
Lonidier has been active since the early 1970s. He taught at University of California, San Diego alongside Martha Rosler, Allan Sekula and Phel Steinmetz. Lonidier lives and works in San Diego, CA. Lonidier is a member of the American Federation of Teachers Local 2034, University of California San Diego. Lonidier has also been a member of the Students for a Democratic Society since 1965. He was active in protests against the Vietnam War.

== Work ==
Lonidier's work is considered conceptual photography. It is imbued with his leftist politics. He is interested in exhibiting work outside the gallery, such as his L.A. --Public Workers Point to Some Problems: Sketches of the Present, Point to the Future for All? which was designed for display at labor-unions. Lonidier's work The Health and Safety Game documents injuries incurred on the job by workers. It has been shown at the Whitney Museum of American Art as well as the AFSCME District Council 37.
