= Ozymandias =

1818 sonnet by Percy Shelley

- by Percy Bysshe Shelley
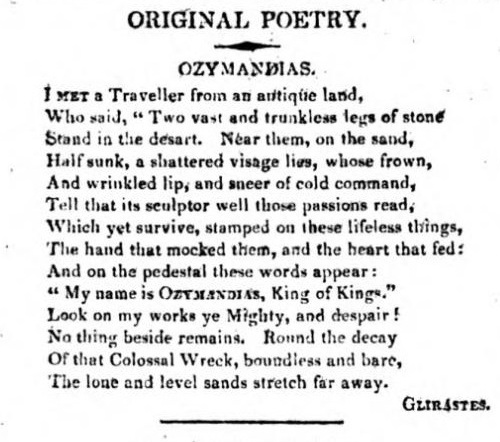
- Shelley's "Ozymandias" in The Examiner
- First published in: 11 January 1818
- Country: England
- Language: Modern English
- Form: Sonnet
- Meter: Loose iambic pentameter
- Rhyme scheme: ABABACDCEDEFEF
- Publisher: The Examiner

Full text
- Ozymandias (Shelley) at Wikisource

"Ozymandias" (/ˌɒzɪˈmændiəs/ OZ-im-AN-dee-əs) is a sonnet written by the English Romantic poet Percy Bysshe Shelley, first published in the 11 January 1818 issue of The Examiner of London.

The poem was the result of a friendly competition between Shelley and fellow poet Horace Smith, using the subject of Egyptian pharaoh Ramesses II, Ozymandias being the pharaoh's Greek name. Both Shelley's poem and Smith's "Ozymandias" explore the ravages of time to which the legacies of even the greatest are subject.

Ozymandias was included the following year in Shelley's collection Rosalind and Helen, A Modern Eclogue; with Other Poems, and in the 1826 compilation Miscellaneous and Posthumous Poems of Percy Bysshe Shelley.

== Origin ==
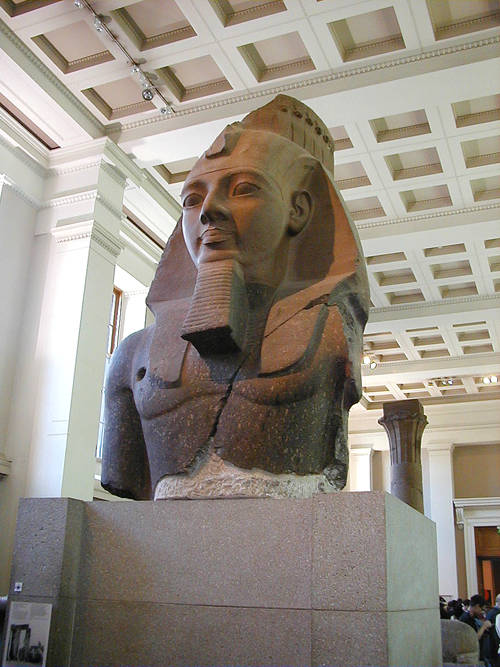
The statue fragment known as the Younger Memnon in the British Museum

Shelley began writing the poem "Ozymandias" in 1817, upon anticipation of the arrival in Britain of the Younger Memnon, a head-and-torso fragment of a statue of Ramesses II acquired by Italian archaeologist Giovanni Battista Belzoni from the Ramesseum, the mortuary temple of Ramesses II at Thebes. Although the Younger Memnon did not arrive in London until 1821, the reputation of the statue fragment had preceded its arrival in Western Europe. European attempts to acquire the 7.25-short-ton (6.58 t; 6,580 kg) fragment had been made as early as 1798, when Napoleon's expedition unsuccessfully attempted to retrieve it.

Shelley, who had explored similar themes in his 1813 work Queen Mab, was also influenced by Constantin François de Chassebœuf's book Les Ruines, ou méditations sur les révolutions des empires (The Ruins, or a Survey of the Revolutions of Empires), first published in an English translation in 1792.

== Writing and publication ==
The banker and political writer Horace Smith spent the Christmas season of 1817–1818 with Percy and Mary Shelley. At this time, members of their literary circle would sometimes challenge each other to write competing sonnets on a common subject: Shelley, John Keats, and Leigh Hunt wrote competing sonnets about the Nile around the same time. Shelley and Smith both chose a passage from the writings of the Greek historian Diodorus Siculus in Bibliotheca historica, which described a massive Egyptian statue and quoted its inscription: "King of Kings Ozymandias am I. If any want to know how great I am and where I lie, let him outdo me in my work." In Shelley's poem, Diodorus has been replaced by "a traveller from an antique land" whom Shelley metaphorically "met". (Note: See footnote 10 at the following source, for reference to the Loeb Classical Library translation of this inscription, by C. H. Oldfather: http://rpo.library.utoronto.ca/poems/ozymandias, accessed 12 April 2014.) (Note: See section/verse 1.47.4 at the following presentation of the 1933 version of the Loeb Classics translation, which also matches the translation appearing here: http://penelope.uchicago.edu/Thayer/E/Roman/Texts/Diodorus_Siculus/1C*.html, accessed 12 April 2014.) (Note: For the original Greek, see: Diodorus Siculus. "1.47.4". Bibliotheca Historica (in Greek). Vol. 1–2. Immanel Bekker. Ludwig Dindorf. Friedrich Vogel. In aedibus B. G. Teubneri. At the Perseus Project.)

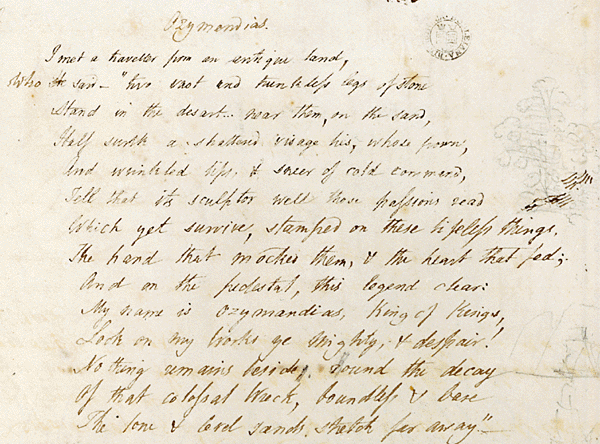
A fair copy draft (c. 1817) of Shelley's "Ozymandias" in the collection of Oxford's Bodleian Library

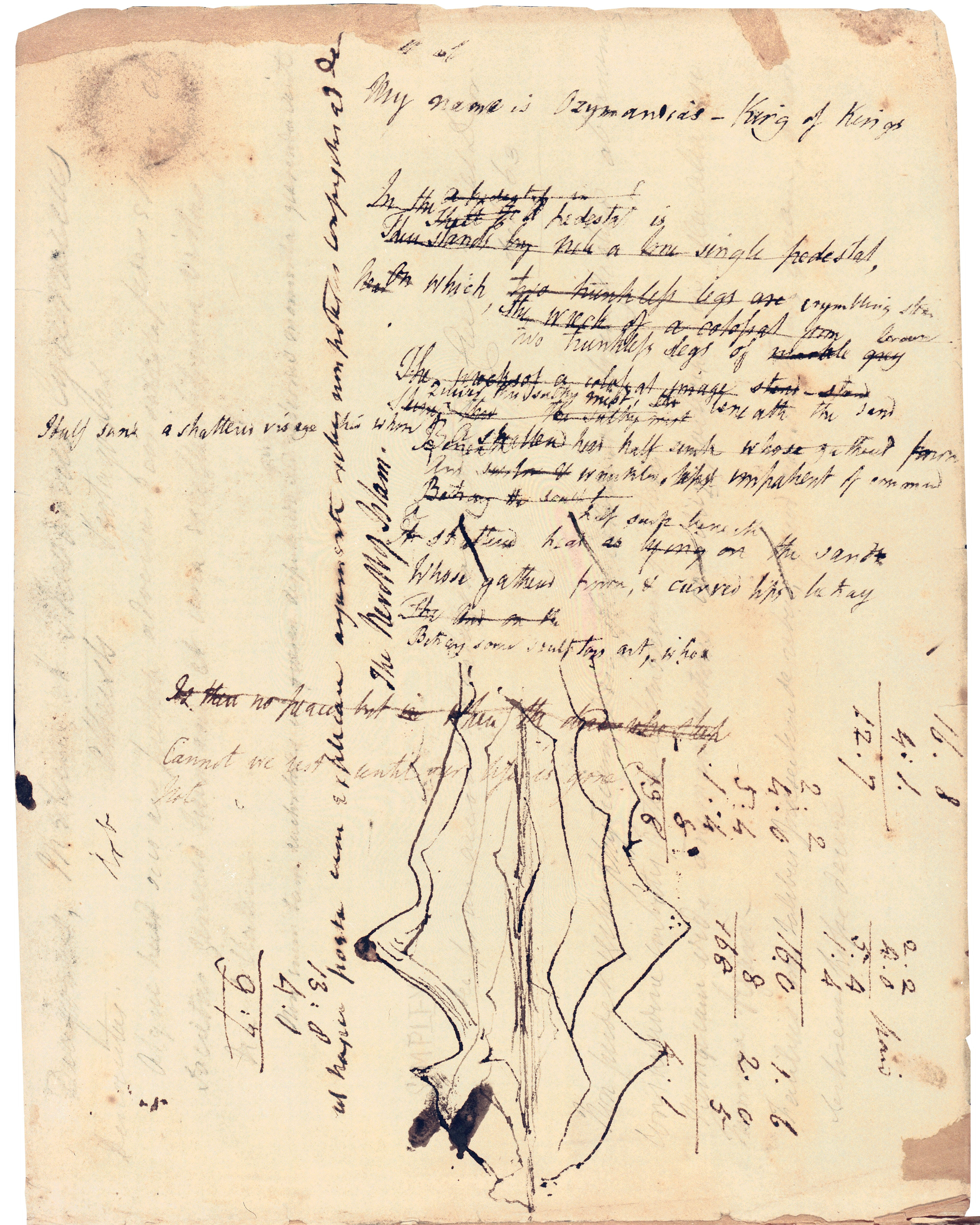
1817 draft by Percy Bysshe Shelley, Bodleian Library

Shelley wrote the poem around Christmas 1817—either in December that year or early January 1818. The poem was published on 11 January 1818 under the pen name "Glirastes" in The Examiner, a weekly paper published by Leigh's brother John Hunt in London. Hunt admired Shelley's poetry, and published many of his other works, such as The Revolt of Islam, in The Examiner. Shelley's pen name meant "lover of dormice", "Dormouse" being his pet name for his spouse, author Mary Shelley.

Smith's sonnet of the same name was published several weeks later. Shelley's poem also appeared on page 24 in the yearly collection, under Original Poetry. It appeared again in Shelley's 1819 collection Rosalind and Helen, A Modern Eclogue; with Other Poems, which was republished in 1876 under the title "Sonnet. Ozymandias" by Charles and James Ollier and in the 1826 Miscellaneous and Posthumous Poems of Percy Bysshe Shelley by William Benbow, both in London.

== Text ==
I met a traveller from an antique land
Who said: Two vast and trunkless legs of stone
Stand in the desart. (Note: Desart was "the regularly accepted spelling of the 18th century" (of desert).) Near them, on the sand,
Half sunk, a shattered visage lies, whose frown,
And wrinkled lip, and sneer of cold command,
Tell that its sculptor well those passions read
Which yet survive, stamped on these lifeless things,
The hand that mocked them and the heart that fed:
And on the pedestal these words appear:
"My name is Ozymandias, king of kings:
Look on my works, ye Mighty, and despair!"
Nothing beside remains. Round the decay
Of that colossal wreck, boundless and bare
The lone and level sands stretch far away.

— Percy Shelley, "Ozymandias", 1819 edition

== Analysis ==
The prominent theme of the poem is the inevitable decline of rulers and their hubris. In the poem, despite Ozymandias' grandiose ambitions, the power turns out to be ephemeral.

Scholars such as professors Nora Crook and Newman White have viewed the work as critical of Shelley's contemporaries George IV, with the statue's legs a coded reference to the then Prince Regent's gout and possible sexually-transmitted diseases, and critical of Napoleon Bonaparte. That the poem is connected to Napoleon is indeed the 21st century accepted reading.

Byron scholar Peter Cochran asserted the poem to be "a lesson to tyrants", listing Napoleon, George IV, Metternich, Tsar Alexander I, Emperor Francis, and Castlereagh. Jalal Uddin Khan connects it, in addition, to the statement of Muammar Gaddafi that he was Africa's "king of kings". That it connects in people's minds to rulers who post-date Shelley is illustrated by incidents such as the one CNN journalist who reported the aerial bombing of Iraq in 1991 signing off the report with the final three lines of the poem.

Other real historic persons to have referred to themselves in such terms include Ashurbanipal who had "I am a hero; I am gigantic; I am colossal; I am magnificent." carved in stone, and Meñli I Giray, who styled himself "Sovereign of Two Continents and Khan of Khans of the Two Seas".

The tragic fall of powerful men is a theme common in literature, from Giovanni Boccaccio's De Casibus Virorum Illustrium through John Lydgate's The Fall of Princes to The Monk's Tale, by Geoffrey Chaucer. The consensus of modern scholarship is that Byron's Childe Harold Canto 3, which was about the fall of Napoleon and whose manuscript Shelley had transported to Byron's publisher John Murray, was also a prompt for the poem.

Like Samuel Taylor Coleridge's Kubla Khan and Shelley's own Alastor, the poem may be viewed in the context of a wave of Orientalism prevalent in Western Europe, helped along by such events as the invasion of Egypt in 1798 by Napoleon and the accompanying Description of Egypt. The imagery of the statue's harsh, but commanding, bearing is evocative of the Byronic hero, and professor Hadley J. Mozer has gone further in suggesting that Shelley was describing Byron's own 1814 portrait by George Henry Harlow.

== Reception and impact ==
The poem has been cited as Shelley's best-known and is generally considered one of his best works, although it is sometimes considered uncharacteristic of his poetry. An article in Alif cited "Ozymandias" as "one of the greatest and most famous poems in the English language". Stephens considered that the Ozymandias Shelley created dramatically altered the opinion of Europeans on the king. It has been translated into Russian, as Shelley was an influential figure in Russia. The influence of the poem may be found in other works, including Wuthering Heights by Emily Brontë.

"Ozymandias" has been included in many poetry anthologies, particularly school textbooks, such as the UK's AQA GCSE English Literature Power and Conflict Anthology, where it is often included because of its perceived simplicity and the relative ease with which it may be memorized. Several poets, including Richard Watson Gilder and John B. Rosenman, have written poems entitled "Ozymandias" in response to Shelley's work.

Ozymandias gilberti, a giant fossil fish from the Miocene of California that is known only from a few fragmentary remains, was named by David Starr Jordan as an allusion to the poem.

The fourteenth episode of the final season of Breaking Bad, covering the dramatic downfall of protagonist Walter White, was entitled "Ozymandias". A recitation of the poem by series lead Bryan Cranston was used in a trailer for the series.

The poem is quoted in the 2017 Ridley Scott science fiction film Alien: Covenant, part of the Alien franchise. The poem is also used in the plot to show David's fallibility as he attributes the poem not to Shelley, but to Lord Byron. Walter reacts: "When one note is off, it eventually destroys the whole symphony, David."

Ozymandias is used in a promotional short film for Bungie's 2026 title Marathon, read by Ben Starr as his in-game character Durandal.

The British stoner/doom metal band Green Lung have recorded a song called "Ozymandias", released on their fourth album "Necropolitan". The song is a loose lyrical adaptation of Shelley's sonnet.

== See also ==
- Vanitas
