= Younger Memnon =

Ancient Egyptian statue

Coordinates: 25.7275°N 32.6104°E

Younger Memnon colossal figure
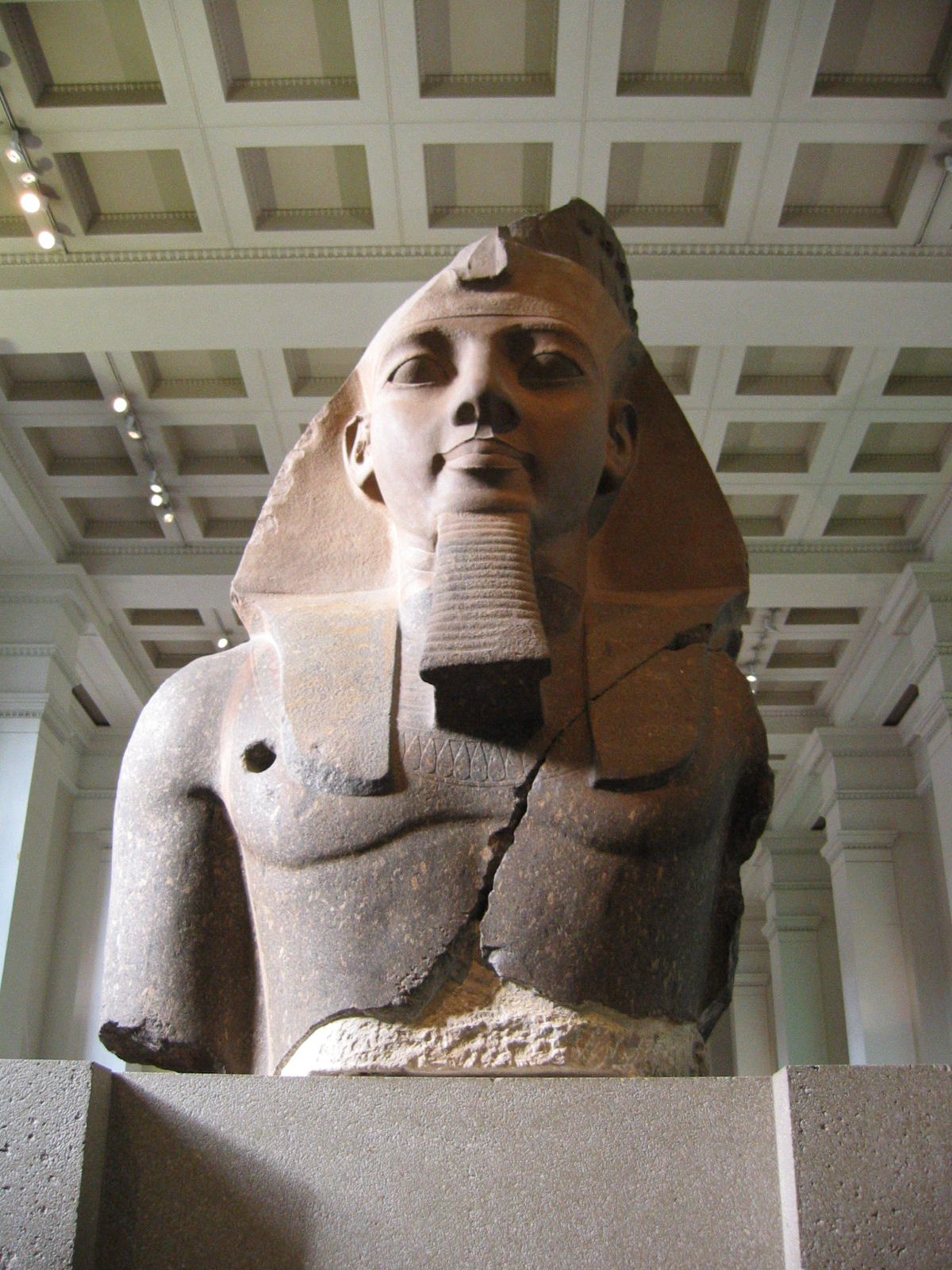
- The Younger Memnon (Ramesses II)
- Material: Granite
- Size: H: 267 cm (105 in); W: 203 cm (80 in)
- Created: c. 1270 BC
- Period/culture: 19th Dynasty
- Place: Ramesseum, Doorway
- Present location: Room 4, British Museum, London
- Identification: EA 19

The Younger Memnon is an Ancient Egyptian statue, one of two colossal granite statues from the Ramesseum mortuary temple in Thebes, Upper Egypt. It depicts the Nineteenth Dynasty Pharaoh Ramesses II wearing the Nemes head-dress with a cobra diadem on top. The damaged statue has since been separated from its upper torso and head. These sections can now be found in the British Museum. The remainder of the statue remains in Egypt. It is one of a pair that originally flanked the Ramesseum's doorway. The head of the other statue is still found at the temple.

== Description ==
The Younger Memnon is 2.7 metres (8 ft 10 in) high × 2 metres (6 ft 7 in) wide (across the shoulders). It weighs 7.25 tons and was cut from a single block of two-coloured granite. There is a slight variation of normal conventions in that the eyes look down slightly more than usual, and to exploit the different colours (broadly speaking, the head is in one colour, and the body another).

== Acquisition ==
=== Belzoni and Salt ===
Napoleon's men tried but failed to dig and remove it to France during his 1798 expedition there, during which he did acquire but then lost the Rosetta Stone. It was during this attempt that the hole on the right of the torso (just above Ramesses's right nipple) is said to have been made.

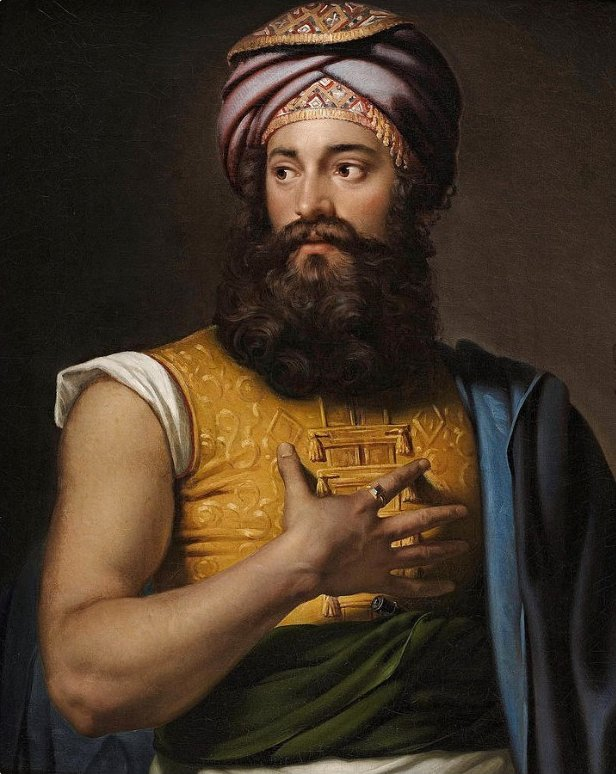
Portrait of Giovanni Belzoni by Jan Adam Kruseman, 1824, Fitzwilliam Museum

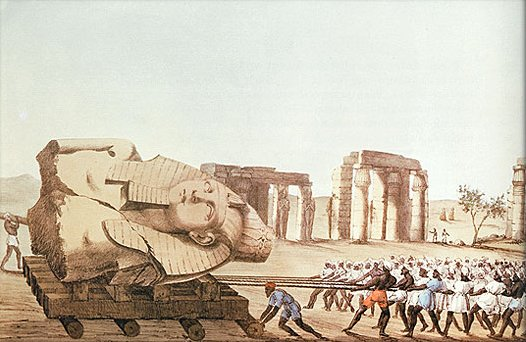
The moving of the Younger Memnon by Italian explorer Giovanni Belzoni

Following an idea mentioned to him by his friend Johann Ludwig Burckhardt of digging the statue and bringing it to Britain, the British Consul General Henry Salt hired the adventurer Giovanni Belzoni in Cairo in 1815 for this purpose. Using his hydraulics and engineering skills, it was pulled on wooden rollers by ropes to the bank of the Nile opposite Luxor by hundreds of workmen. However, no boat was yet available to take it up to Alexandria and so Belzoni carried out an expedition to Nubia, returning by October. With French collectors also in the area possibly looking to acquire the statue, he then sent workmen to Esna to gain a suitable boat and in the meantime carried out further excavations in Thebes. He finally loaded the products of these digs, plus the Memnon, onto this boat and got it to Cairo by 15 December 1816. There he received and obeyed orders from Salt to unload all but the Memnon, which was then sent on to Alexandria and London without him.

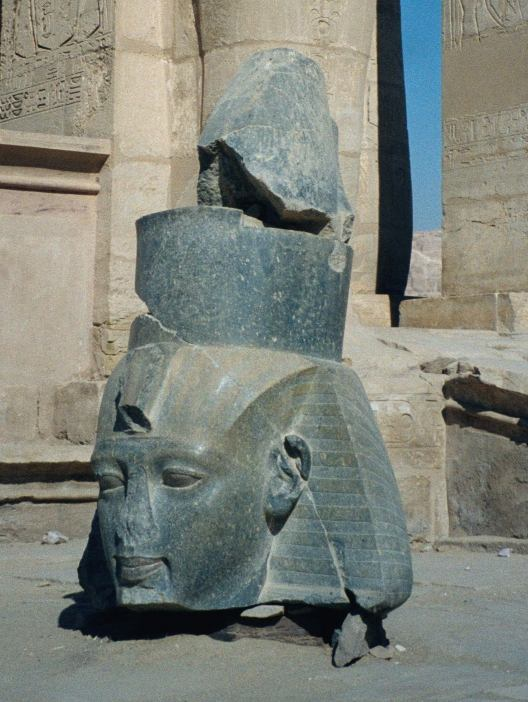
The pair to The Younger Memnon, still at the Ramesseum

=== Arrival in London ===
Anticipated by the poetry contest between Horace Smith and Percy Bysshe Shelley, both writing poems titled "Ozymandias" (see also Ozymandias (Smith)), the head arrived in 1818 on the ship Weymouth in Deptford. Smith and Shelley met in the literary circles of Leigh Hunt, the co-founder of The Examiner, where story-telling and poem-writing competitions were common.

The poems were the outcomes of when the two writers faced off in the pages of Hunt’s magazine, writing about Ozymandias, a mis-reading of one of Ramesses II names, User-Ma’at-Re. Shelley’s poem has been analyzed by literary critics and scholars several times in the last two hundred years, but Smith’s poem has not garnered as much attention. Some have said that ‘Smith’s poem…in its mediocrity shows how successful Shelley’s really is…’

In London the head acquired its name "The Younger Memnon", after the "Memnoninum" (the name in classical times for the Ramesseum – the two statues at the entrance of the mortuary temple of Amenhotep III were associated with Memnon in classical times, and are still known as the Colossi of Memnon. The British Museum sculpture and its pair seem to have either been mistaken for them or suffered a similar misnaming).

=== British Museum ===
The installation of the Younger Memnon at the British Museum sculpture gallery

It was later acquired from Salt in 1821 by the British Museum and was at first displayed in the old Townley Galleries (now demolished) for several years, then installed (using heavy ropes and lifting equipment and with help from the Royal Engineers) in 1834 in the new Egyptian Sculpture Gallery (now Room 4, where it now resides). The soldiers were commanded by a Waterloo veteran, Major Charles Cornwallis Dansey, lame from a wound sustained there, who therefore sat whilst commanding them. On its arrival there, it could be said to be the first piece of Egyptian sculpture to be recognized as a work of art rather than a curiosity low down in the chain of art (with ancient Greek art at the pinnacle of this chain). It is museum number EA 19.

In February 2010, the statue was featured as object 20 in A History of the World in 100 Objects, a BBC Radio 4 programme by British Museum director Neil MacGregor.

== Gallery ==
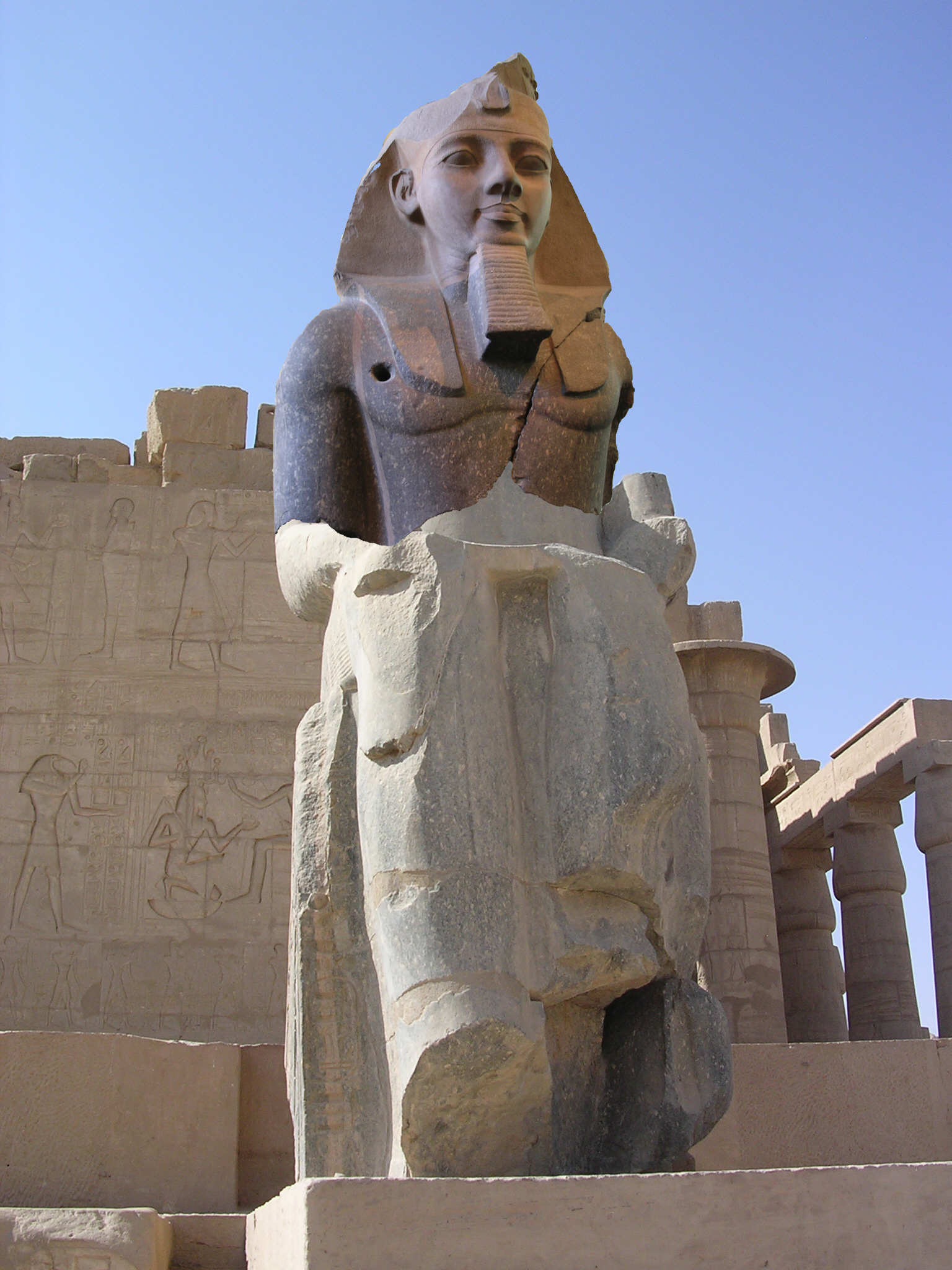
The Younger Memnon digitally restored to the lower half of the statue still in the Ramesseum

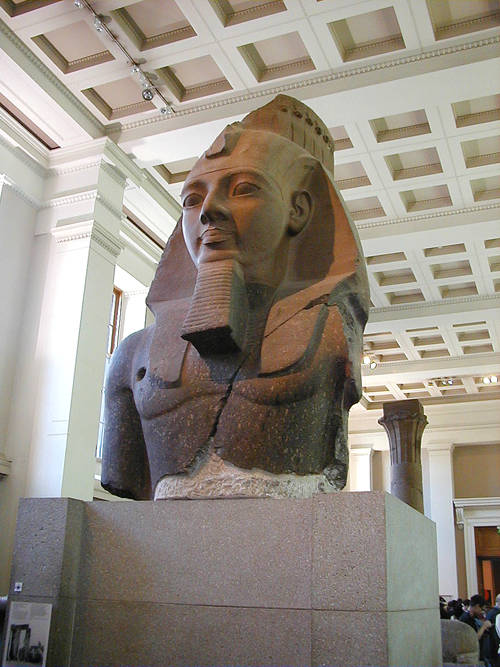
Another view of The Younger Memnon

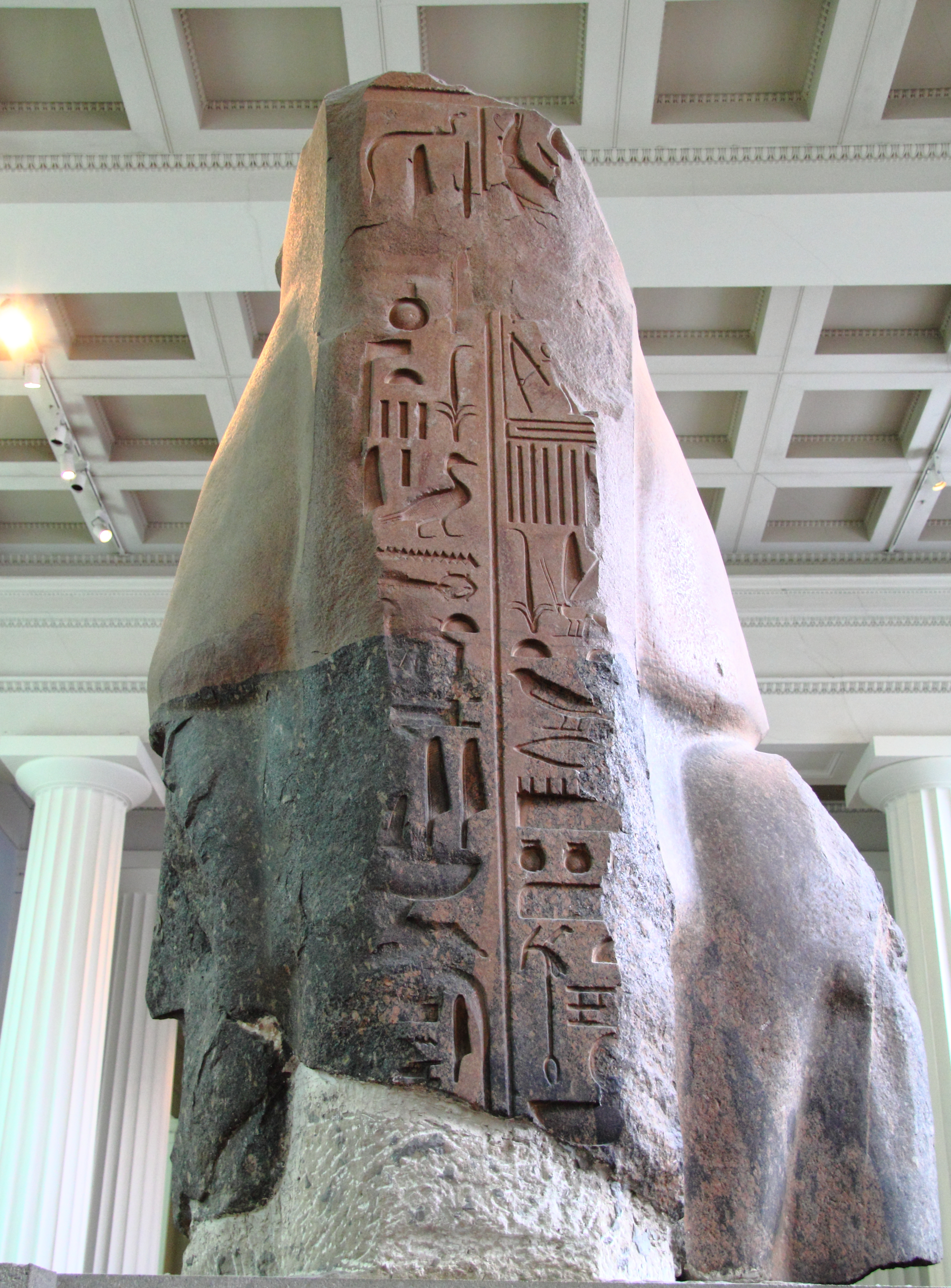
Hieroglyphic Inscription on the back pillar of the bust

== Sources ==
- British Museum Catalogue entry
- 3D model of the Younger Memnon via photogrammetric survey
- Encyclopaedic.net – extracts from Belzoni's account

Publications

- James, T. G. H.; Davies, W. V. (1983), Egyptian Sculpture, Harvard University Press, p. 41, ISBN 978-0-674-24161-9
- G. Belzoni, Narrative of the operations and recent discoveries within the pyramids, temples, tombs, and excavations in Egypt and Nubia I (London, John Murray, 1822), pp. 61–80
- S. Quirke and A.J. Spencer, The British Museum book of ancient Egypt (London, The British Museum Press, 1992), pp. 126–7
- Albert M. Lythgoe, 'Statues of the Goddess Sekhmet', The Metropolitan Museum of Art Bulletin Vol. 14, No. 10, Part 2 (Oct., 1919), pp. 1+3-23
- Stephanie Moser, Wondrous Curiosities: Ancient Egypt at the British Museum (University of Chicago Press, 2006), ISBN 0-226-54209-2
This article is about an item held in the British Museum. The object reference is EA 19.

Preceded by 19: Mold cape	A History of the World in 100 Objects; Object 20	Succeeded by 21: Lachish Reliefs
