= Ozymandias (Smith) =

Sonnet written by Horace Smith

- by Horace Smith
- First published in: 1 February 1818
- Country: England
- Form: Sonnet
- Rhyme scheme: ABBA BABA CCD CDD
- Publisher: The Examiner

Full text
- Ozymandias (Smith) at Wikisource

"Ozymandias" (/ˌɒzɪˈmændiəs/ OZ-im-AN-dee-əs) is the title of a sonnet published in 1818 by Horace Smith (1779–1849). Smith wrote the poem in friendly competition with his friend and fellow poet Percy Bysshe Shelley. Shelley wrote and published "Ozymandias" in 1818. Smith's poem was published in The Examiner three weeks after Shelley's, on 1 February 1818. It explores the fates of history and the ravages of time.

== Writing and publication ==
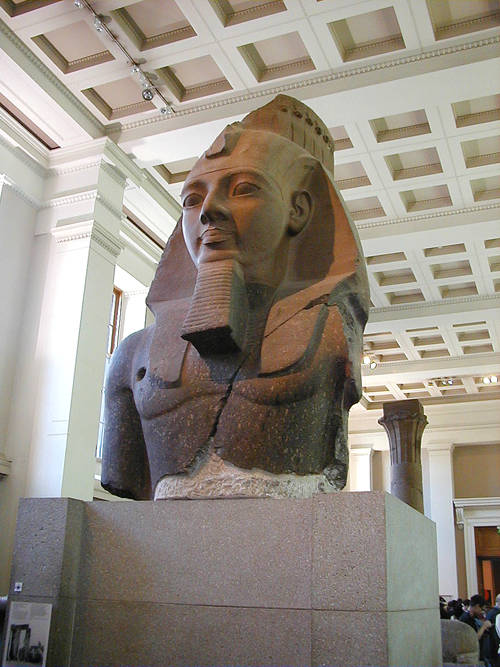
The colossal statue of Ramesses II, the Younger Memnon, on display in the British Museum

The banker and political writer Horace Smith spent the Christmas season of 1817–1818 with Percy Bysshe Shelley and Mary Shelley. At this time, members of the Shelleys' literary circle would sometimes challenge each other to write competing sonnets on a common subject: Shelley, John Keats, and Leigh Hunt wrote competing sonnets about the Nile around the same time. Shelley and Smith both chose a passage from the writings of the Greek historian Diodorus Siculus, which described a massive Egyptian statue and quoted its inscription: "King of Kings Ozymandias am I. If any want to know how great I am and where I lie, let him outdo me in my work."

Smith's poem was published, along with a note signed with the initials H.S., on 1 February 1818. It takes the same subject, tells the same story, and makes a similar moral point, but one related more directly to modernity, ending by imagining a hunter of the future looking in wonder on the ruins of a forgotten London. It was originally published under the same title as Shelley's verse, but in later collections, Smith retitled it "On A Stupendous Leg of Granite, Discovered Standing by Itself in the Deserts of Egypt, with the Inscription Inserted Below".

== Text ==
In Egypt's sandy silence, all alone,
Stands a gigantic Leg, which far off throws
The only shadow that the Desert knows:—
"I am great Ozymandias," saith the stone,
"The King of Kings; this mighty City shows
The wonders of my hand."— The City's gone,—
Naught but the Leg remaining to disclose
The site of this forgotten Babylon.

We wonder — and some Hunter may express
Wonder like ours, when thro' the wilderness
Where London stood, holding the Wolf in chace,
He meets some fragment huge, and stops to guess
What powerful but unrecorded race
Once dwelt in that annihilated place.

— Horace Smith, "Ozymandias"

== See also ==
- "Eighteen Hundred and Eleven", a poem by Anna Laetitia Barbauld which also imagines future tourists visiting a ruined London
