= Ramesseum =

Memorial temple of Ramesses II in Egypt

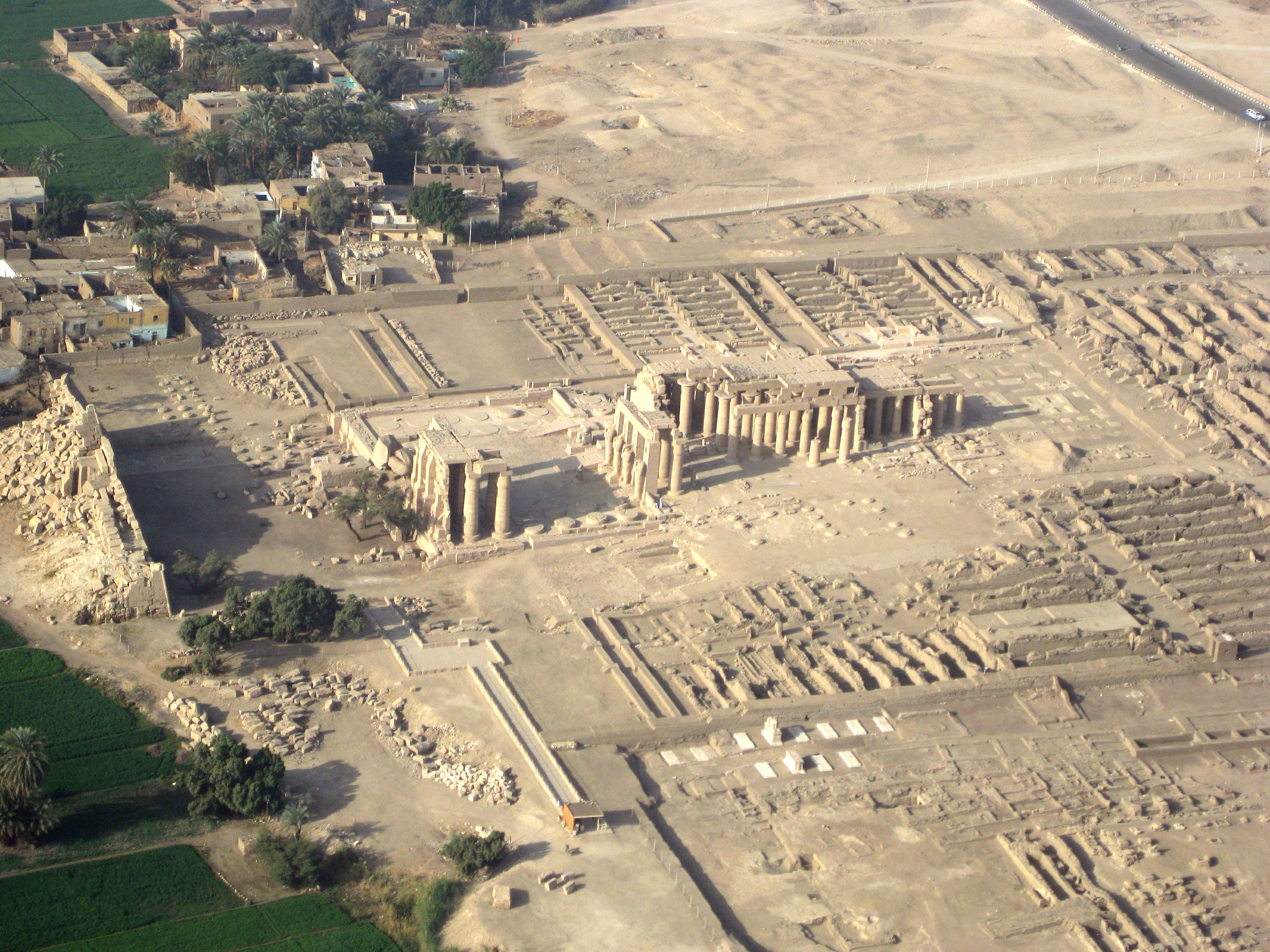
- Aerial view of Thebes' Ramesseum, showing pylons and secondary buildings

- Location within Egypt
- 25°43′40″N 32°36′38″E
- Type: Sanctuary
- Location: Luxor, Luxor Governorate, Egypt
- Region: Upper Egypt
- Part of: Theban Necropolis

History
- Built: 13th century BC
- Built by: Ramesses II

UNESCO World Heritage Site
- Official name: Ancient Thebes with its Necropolis
- Type: Cultural
- Criteria: i, iii, vi
- Designated: 1979 (3rd session)
- Reference no.: 87
- Region: Arab States

The Ramesseum is the memorial temple (or mortuary temple) of Pharaoh Ramesses II ("Ramesses the Great"). It is located in the Theban Necropolis in Upper Egypt, on the west of the River Nile, across from the modern city of Luxor.

It is the second largest temple in Egypt, occupying an area of c. 10 hectares (1,100,000 sq ft).

It was originally called the House of millions of years of Usermaatra-setepenra that unites with Thebes-the-city in the domain of Amun. Usermaatra-setepenra was the prenomen of Ramesses II.

== History ==
Ramesses II modified, usurped, or constructed many buildings from the ground up, and the most splendid of these, in accordance with New Kingdom royal burial practices, would have been his memorial temple: a place of worship dedicated to pharaoh, god on earth, where his memory would have been kept alive after his death. Surviving records indicate that work on the project began shortly after the start of his reign and continued for 20 years.

The design of Ramesses's mortuary temple adheres to the standard canons of New Kingdom temple architecture. Oriented northwest and southeast, the temple itself comprised two stone pylons (gateways, some 60 metres (200 ft) wide), one after the other, each leading into a courtyard. Beyond the second courtyard, at the centre of the complex, was a covered 48-column hypostyle hall, surrounding the inner sanctuary. An enormous pylon stood before the first court, with the royal palace at the left and the gigantic statue of the king looming up at the back. As was customary, the pylons and outer walls were decorated with scenes commemorating the pharaoh's military victories and leaving due record of his dedication to, and kinship with, the gods. In Ramesses's case, much importance is placed on the Battle of Kadesh (ca. 1274 BC); more intriguingly, however, one block atop the first pylon records his pillaging, in the eighth year of his reign, a city called "Shalem", which may or may not have been Jerusalem. The scenes of the great pharaoh and his army triumphing over the Hittite forces fleeing before Kadesh, as portrayed in the canons of the "epic poem of Pentaur", can still be seen on the pylon.

Unlike the massive stone temples that Ramesses ordered carved from the face of the Nubian mountains at Abu Simbel, the inexorable passage of three millennia was not kind to his "temple of a million years" at Thebes. This was mostly due to its location on the very edge of the Nile floodplain, with the annual inundation gradually undermining the foundations of this temple and its neighbours. Neglect and the arrival of new faiths also took their toll: for example, in the early years of the Christian Era, the temple was put into service as a Christian church.

This is all standard fare for a temple of its kind built at that time. Leaving aside the escalation of scale – whereby each successive New Kingdom pharaoh strove to outdo his predecessors in volume and scope – the Ramesseum is largely cast in the same mould as the ruined temple of Amenhotep III that stood behind the "Colossi of Memnon" a kilometre or so away, and Ramesses III's Medinet Habu which closely followed the plan of the Ramesseum. Instead, the significance that the Ramesseum enjoys today owes more to the time and manner of its rediscovery by Europeans.

== Description ==
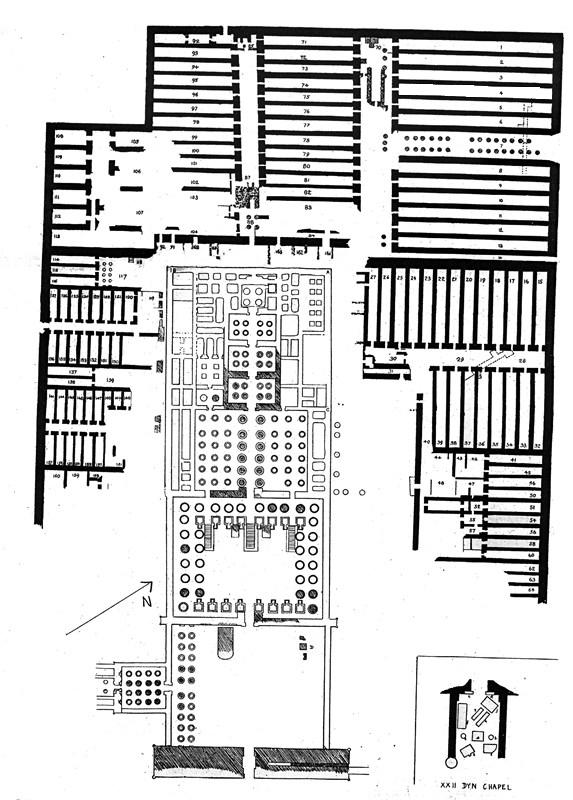
Plan of the Ramesseum

=== First courtyard ===
The Ramesseum was entered through a Pylon which led to the first courtyard. At its rear stood a pair of colossal statues, which flanked the second pylon. The larger of the two was called "Sun of the princes" and represented Ramesses, the smaller one his mother Tuya.

Only fragments of the base and torso remain of the syenite statue of the enthroned pharaoh, which is estimated to have weighed 1,000 tonnes (2,200,000 lb) with a height of 16–19 metres (52–62 ft). It was transported 220 kilometres (140 mi) from the quarry to the Ramesseum. It is one of the largest colossal statues in the world. However, fragments of four even larger granite colossi of Ramesses were found in Tanis (northern Egypt) with an estimated height of 21 to 28 metres (69 to 92 ft).

=== Second courtyard ===
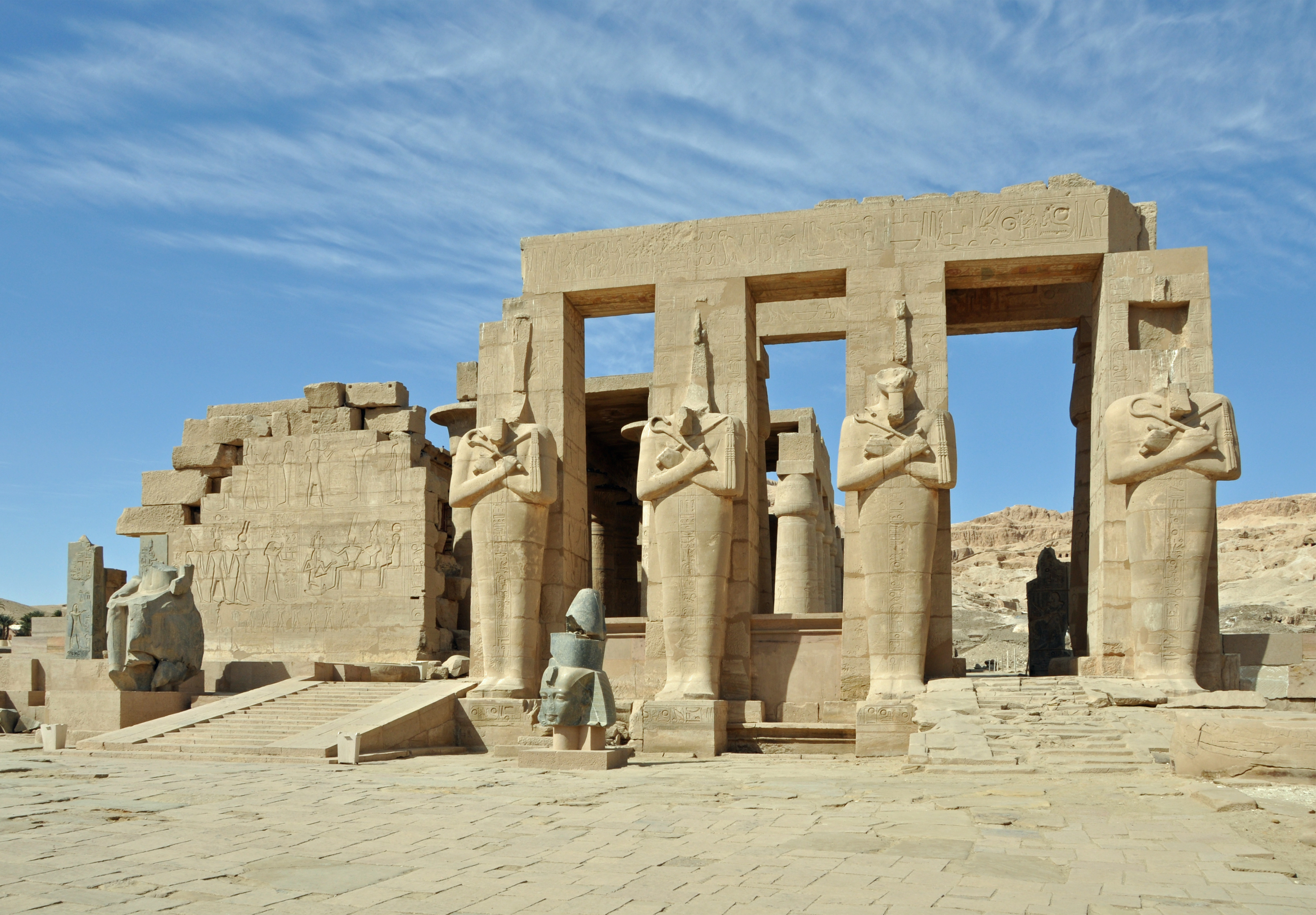
The "other" granite head displayed in front of Osiris statues

Remains of the second court include part of the internal façade of the pylon and a portion of the Osiride portico on the right. Scenes of war and the rout of the Hittites at Kadesh are repeated on the walls. In the upper registers, are shown a feast in honour of the phallic god Min, god of fertility. On the opposite side of the court the few Osiride pillars and columns still left furnish an idea of the original grandeur. Scattered remains of the two statues of the seated king which once flanked the entrance to the temple can also be seen, one in pink granite and the other in black granite. The head of one of these has been removed to the British Museum. Thirty-nine out of the forty-eight columns in the great hypostyle hall, which is 41 by 31 metres (130 by 100 ft), still stand in the central rows. They are decorated with the usual scenes of the king before various gods. Part of the ceiling, decorated with gold stars on a blue, ground has also been preserved. The sons and daughters of Ramesses appear in the procession on the few walls left. The sanctuary was composed of three consecutive rooms, with eight columns and the tetrastyle cell. Part of the first room, with the ceiling decorated with astral scenes, and a few remains of the second room are all that is left.

Adjacent to the north of the hypostyle hall was a smaller temple; this was dedicated to Ramesses's mother, Tuya, and to his beloved chief wife, Nefertari. To the south of the first courtyard stood the temple palace. The complex was surrounded by various storerooms, granaries, workshops, and other ancillary buildings, some built as late as Roman times.

A temple of Seti I, of which nothing is now left but the foundations, once stood to the right of the hypostyle hall. It consisted of a peristyle court with two chapel shrines. The entire complex was surrounded by mudbrick walls which started at the gigantic southeast pylon.

A cache of papyri and ostraca dating back to the Third Intermediate Period (11th to 8th centuries BC) indicates that the temple was also the site of an important scribal school.

The site was in use before Ramesses had the first stone put in place: beneath the hypostyle hall, modern archaeologists have found a shaft tomb from the Middle Kingdom, yielding a rich hoard of religious and funerary artefacts. Part of a causeway, intended to connect to the incomplete Mortuary Temple of Mentuhotep III were also found underneath the foundations of the Ramesseum.

== Ramesseum king list ==
The memorial temple of Ramesses II, also called simply the Ramesseum, contains a minor list of pharaohs of ancient Egypt. The scene with the list was first published by Jean-Francois Champollion in 1845, and by Karl Richard Lepsius four years later.

The upper register of the second western pylon, shows a processions where ancestors of Ramesses II are honored at ceremonies of the festival of Min. It contains 19 cartouches with the names of 14 pharaohs, listing less pharaohs than his kings list in Abydos. Notably, Hatshepsut and the Amarna pharaohs are omitted.

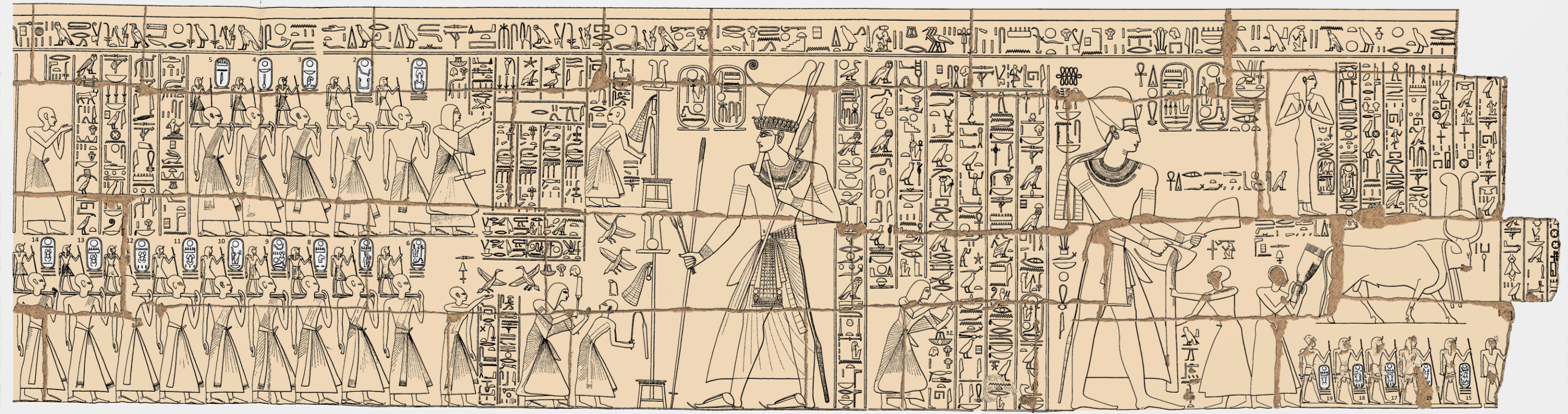
Drawing of the Ramesseum King list of Ramesses II

The scene is divided in two parts, one with 14 statues of the ancestral kings being carried in a procession on the left side. The second part is a procession led by six kings, but only the name of five remain.

Left procession			Right procession		
#	Pharaoh	Inscription (throne name)	#	Pharaoh	Inscription (throne name)
1	Thutmose I	Aakheperkare	15	Horemheb	Djeserkheperure-setepenre
2	Amenhotep I	Djeserkare	16	Amenhotep III	Nebmaatre
3	Ahmose I	Nebpehtyre	17	Thutmose IV	Menkheperure
4	Mentuhotep II	Nebhepetre	18	Amenhotep II	Aakheperure
5	Menes	Meni	19	Thutmose III	Menkheperre
6	Ramesses II	Usermaatre-setepenre			
7	Seti I	Menmaatre			
8	Ramesses I	Menpehtyre			
9	Horemheb	Djeserkheperure-setepenre			
10	Amenhotep III	Nebmaatre			
11	Thutmose IV	Menkheperure			
12	Amenhotep II	Aakheperure			
13	Thutmose III	Menkheperre			
14	Thutmose II	Aakheperenre			

The scene remains in situ in the upper register of the second western pylon. The later Medinet Habu king list of Ramesses III is very similar in design, but only lists nine pharaohs.

== Storage ==
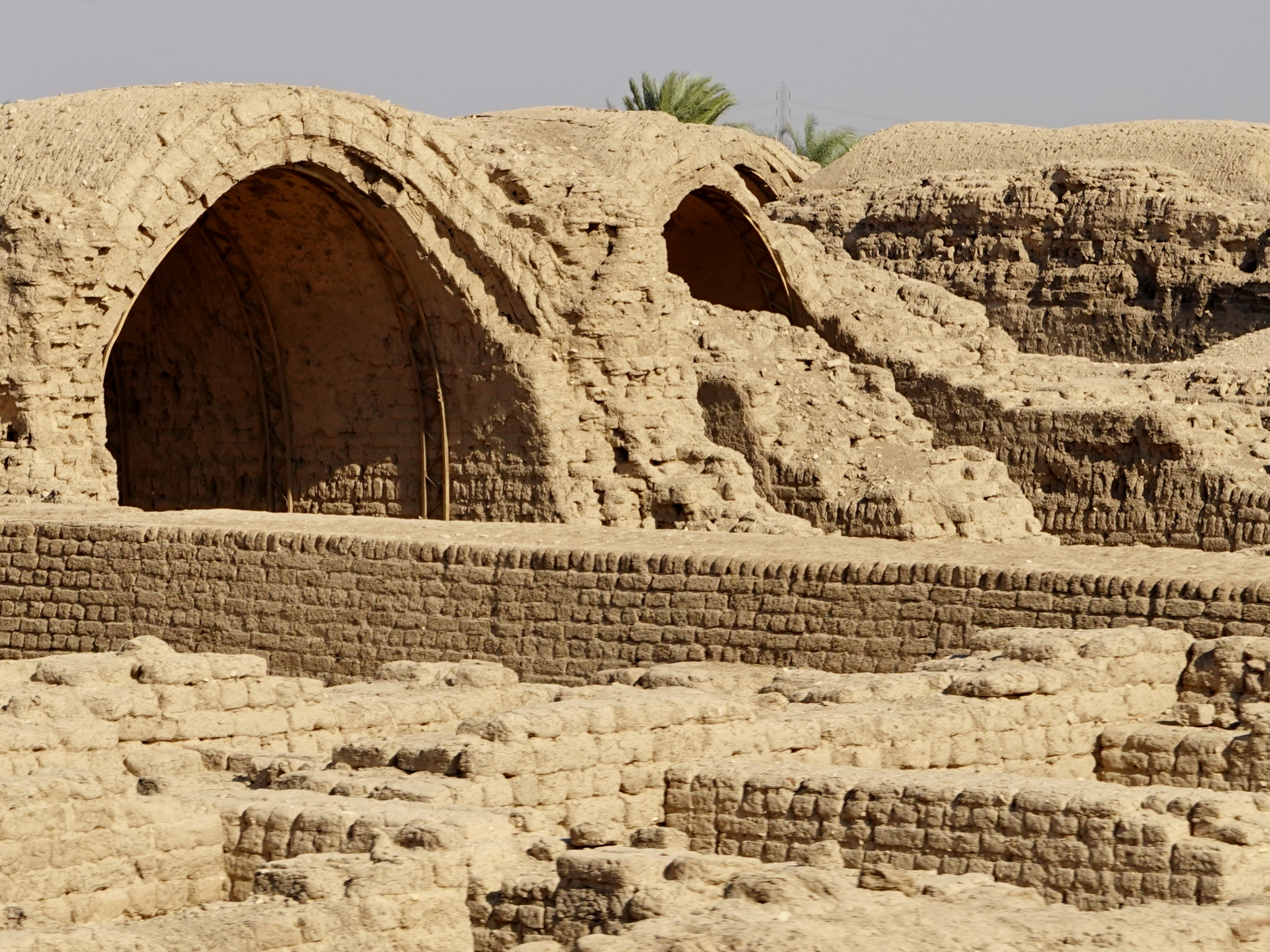
A true arch at the Ramesseum granaries

The storerooms surround the temple on three sides, forming three groups, with the oldest behind the temple. The site is notable for its true arches made of mud bricks that were not wedge-shaped as proper voussoirs, but simply held in place by mortar and thus prone to collapse, leaving very few examples still standing. Ramesseum has the oldest such arch still standing in Egypt (c. 1300 BC).

Each granary in the oldest group was approximately 32 metres (105 ft) in length, 3.7 m (12 ft) wide and 3.5 m (11 ft) high, with a bottom wall thickness of 1.5 m (4.9 ft). The springing level of a barrel vault at the height of approximately 2.5 m (8.2 ft), with arcs build as four courses of mud bricks 40 by 20 by 12 to 14 centimetres (15.7 by 7.9 by 4.7 to 5.5 in) in size.

== Excavation and studies ==
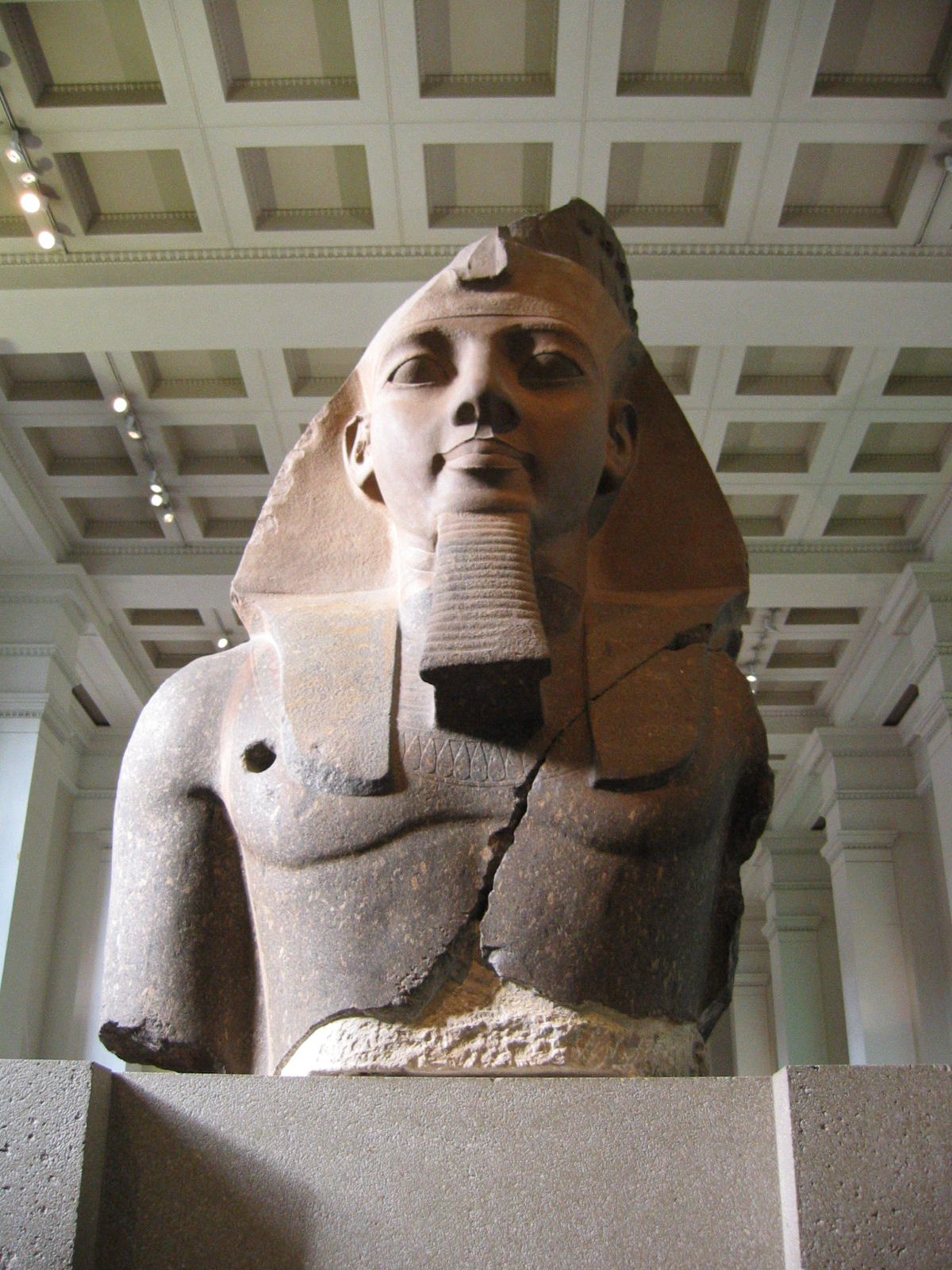
The 'Younger Memnon'

The origins of modern Egyptology can be traced to the arrival in Egypt of Napoleon Bonaparte in the summer of 1798. Alongside Napoleon's troops went men of science, the same whose toil under the desert sun would later yield the seminal 23-volume Description de l'Égypte. Two French engineers, Jean-Baptiste Prosper Jollois and Édouard de Villiers du Terrage, were assigned to study the Ramesseum site, and it was with much fanfare that they identified it with the "Tomb of Ozymandias" or "Palace of Memnon" of which Diodorus of Sicily had written in the 1st century BC.

The next visitor of note was Giovanni Belzoni, a showman and engineer of Italian origin and, latterly, an archaeologist and antiques dealer. Belzoni's travels took him in 1815 to Cairo, where he sold Mehemet Ali a hydraulic engine of his own invention. There he met British Consul General Henry Salt, who hired his services to collect from the temple in Thebes the so-called 'Younger Memnon', the torso of one of two colossal granite statues depicting Ramesses II, and transport it to England. Thanks to Belzoni's hydraulics and his skill as an engineer (Napoleon's men had failed in the same endeavour a decade or so earlier), the 7-ton stone head arrived in London in 1818, where it was dubbed "The Younger Memnon" and, some years later, given pride of place in the British Museum.

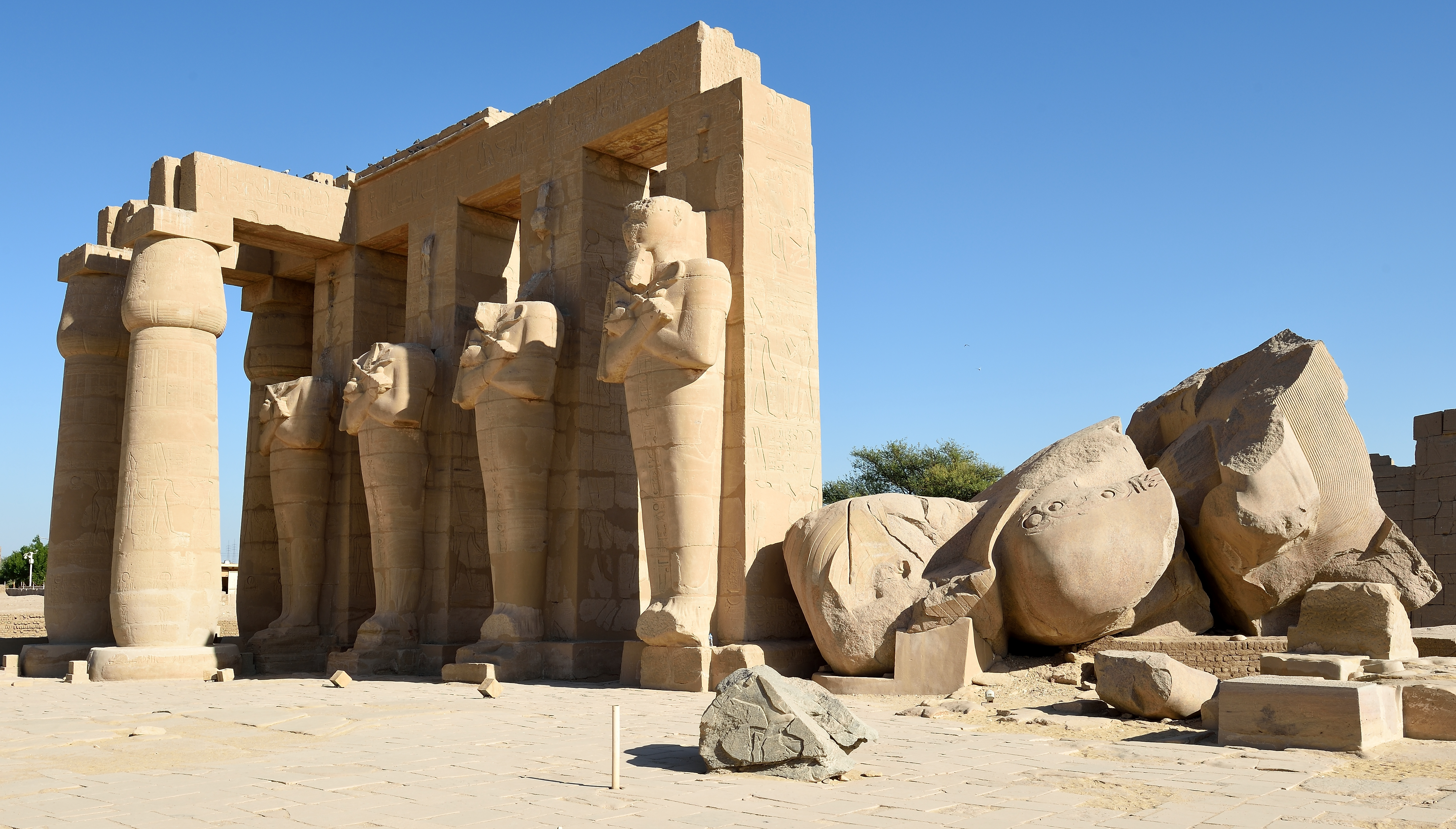
The fallen Ozymandias Colossus

It was against the backdrop of intense excitement surrounding the statue's arrival, and having heard wondrous tales of other, less transportable treasures still in the desert, that the poet Percy Bysshe Shelley penned his sonnet "Ozymandias". In particular, one massive fallen statue at the Ramesseum is now inextricably linked with Shelley, because of the cartouche on its shoulder bearing Ramesses's throne name, User-maat-re Setep-en-re, the first part of which Diodorus transliterated into Greek as "Ozymandias". While Shelley's "vast and trunkless legs of stone" owe more to poetic license than to archaeology, the "half sunk... shattered visage" lying on the sand is an accurate description of part of the wrecked statue. The hands, and the feet, lie nearby. Were it still standing, the Ozymandias colossus would tower 19 m (62 ft) above the ground, rivalling the Colossi of Memnon and the statues of Ramesses carved into the mountain at Abu Simbel.

The name of the Ramesseum – or at least its French form Rhamesséion – was coined by Jean-François Champollion, who visited the ruins of the site in 1829 and first identified the hieroglyphs making up Ramesses's names and titles on the walls.

A joint French-Egyptian team has been exploring and restoring the Ramesseum and its environs since 1991. Among their discoveries during excavations include kitchens, bakeries and supply rooms for the temple to the south, and a school where boys were taught to be scribes to the southeast. Some of the challenges in preserving the area have been the control of modern Egyptian farmers using the area for farming and encroaching on the ruins.

== Gallery ==
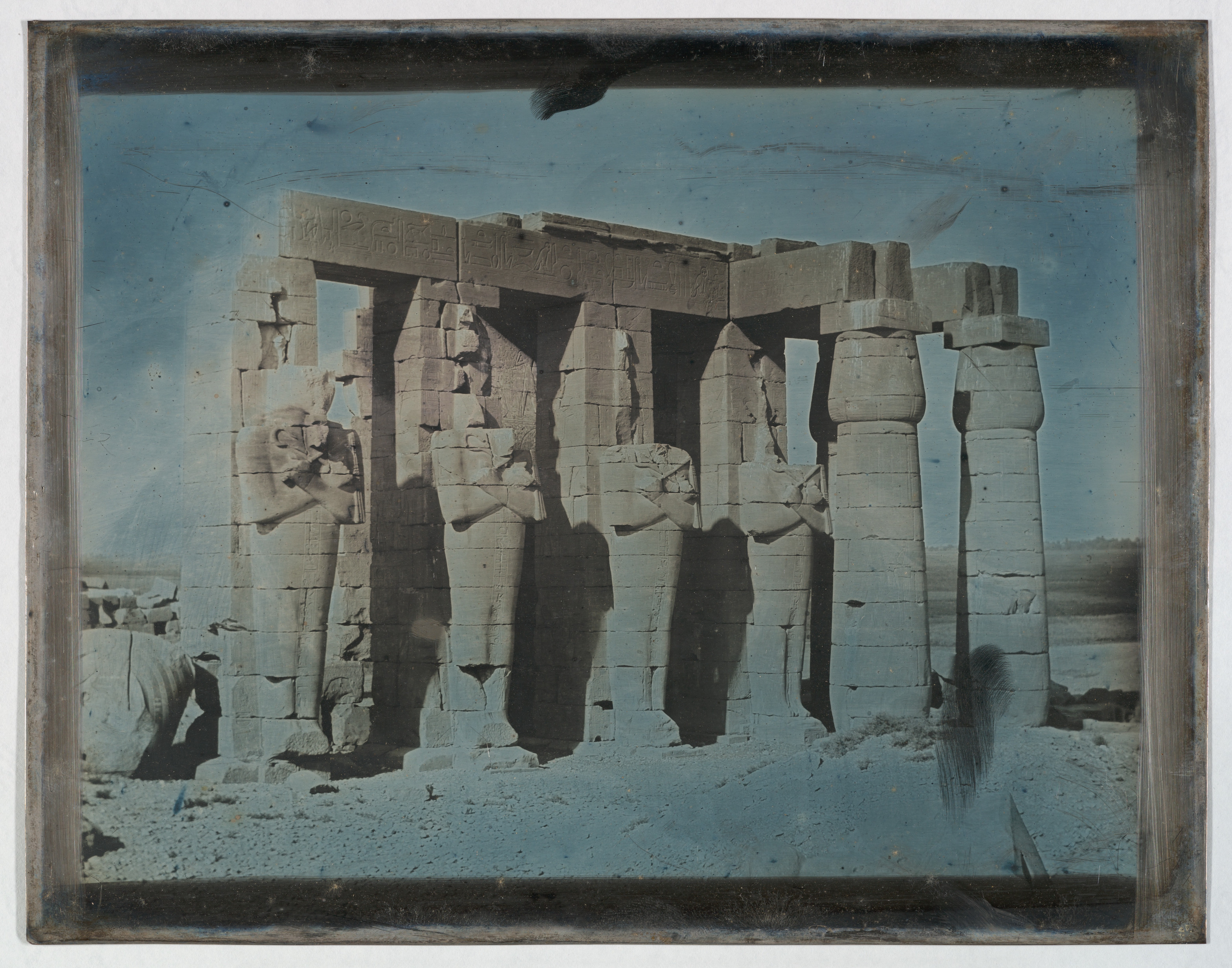
1844 daguerreotype by Joseph-Philibert Girault de Prangey

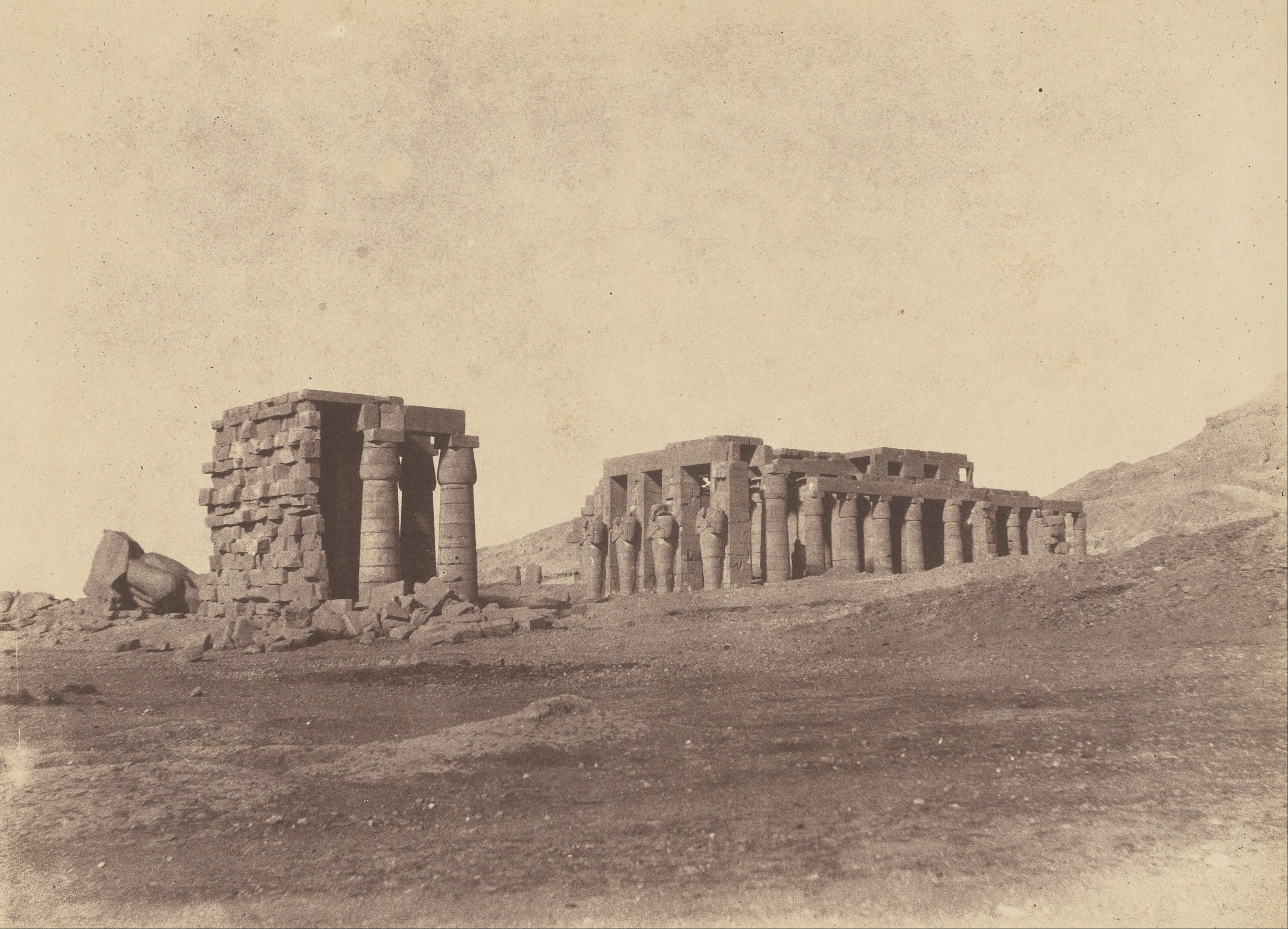
Earliest photos, 1854 by John Beasley Greene

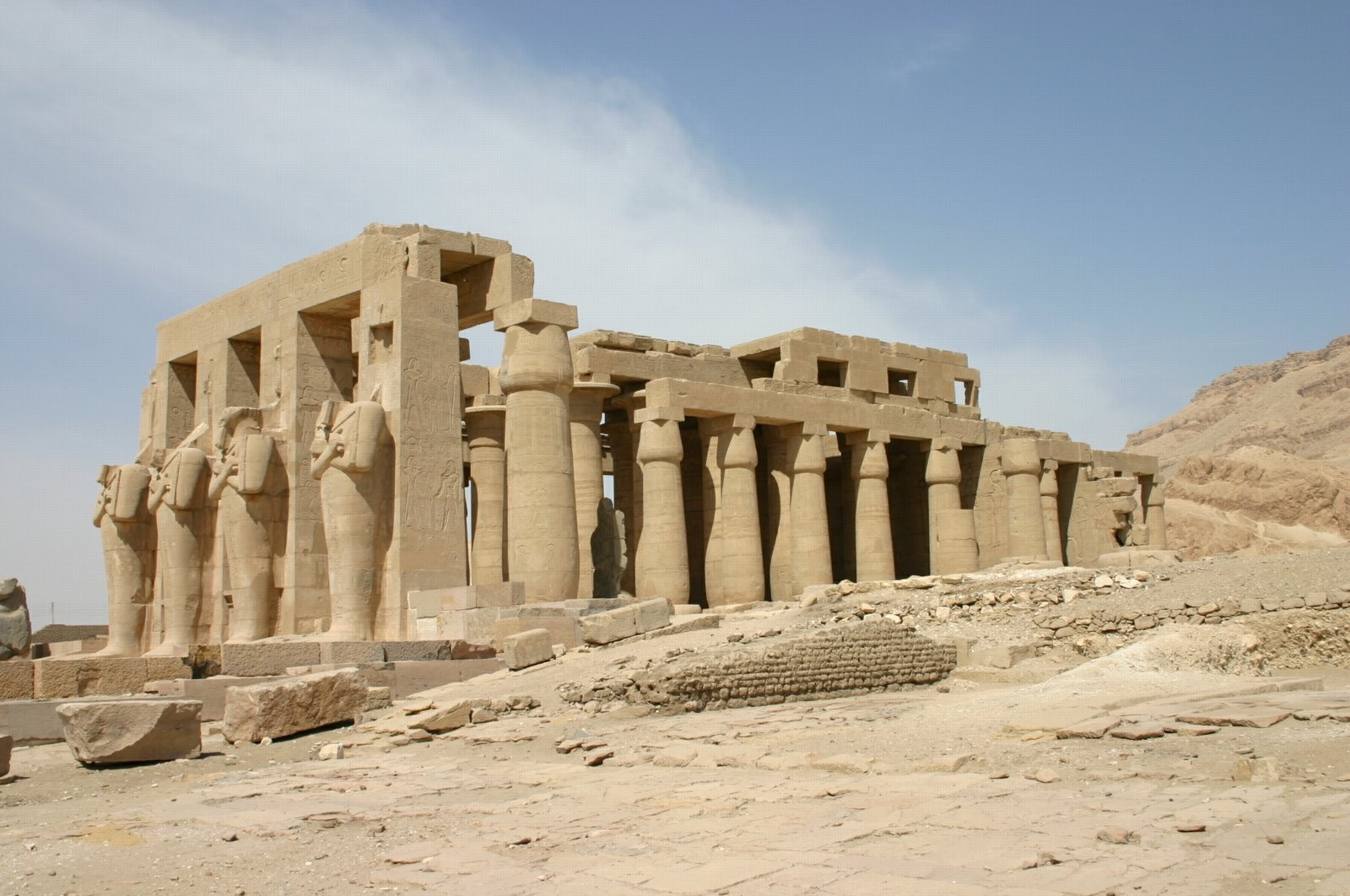
Temple of Ramesses II, Luxor

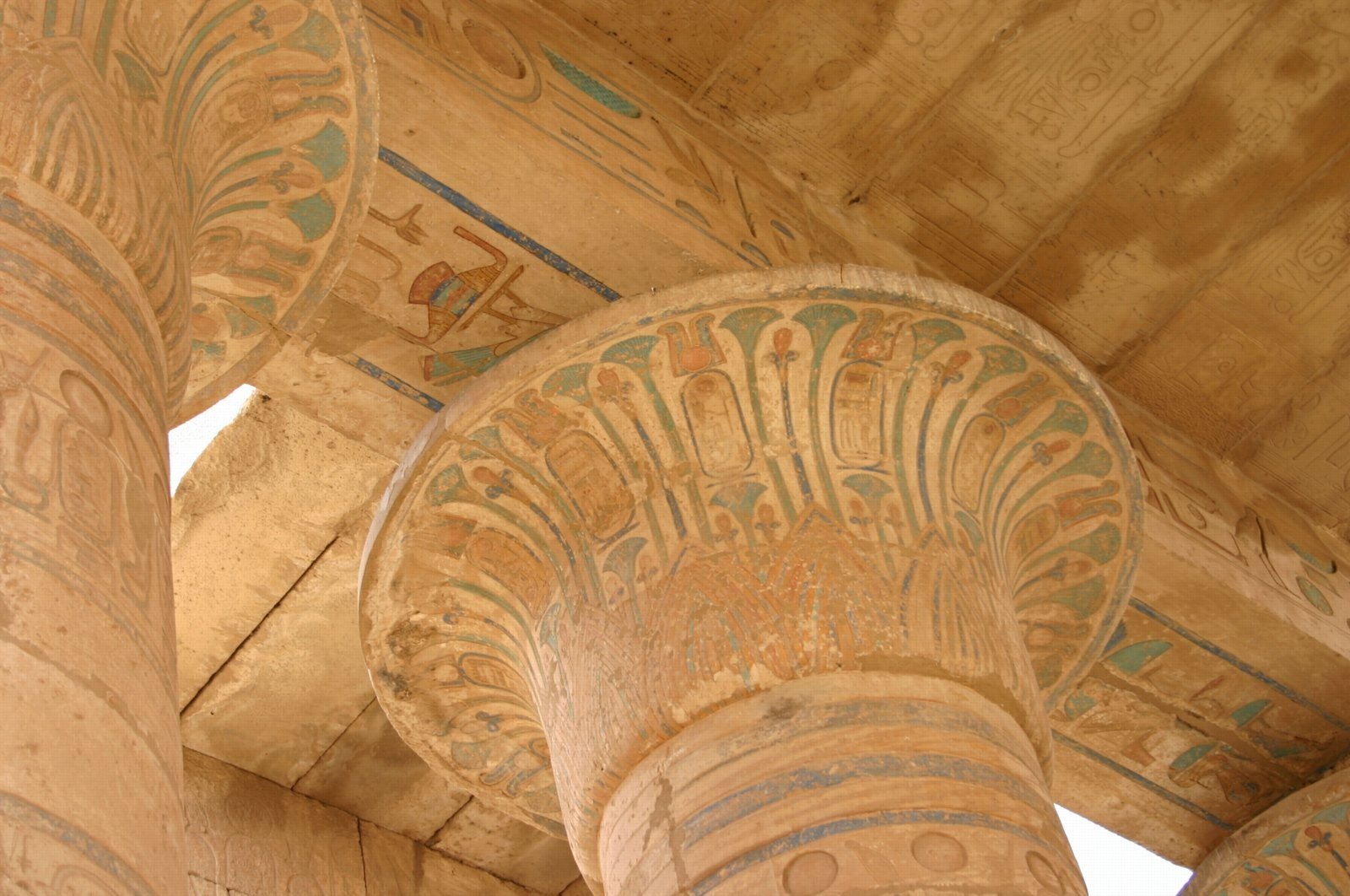
Hypostyle hall

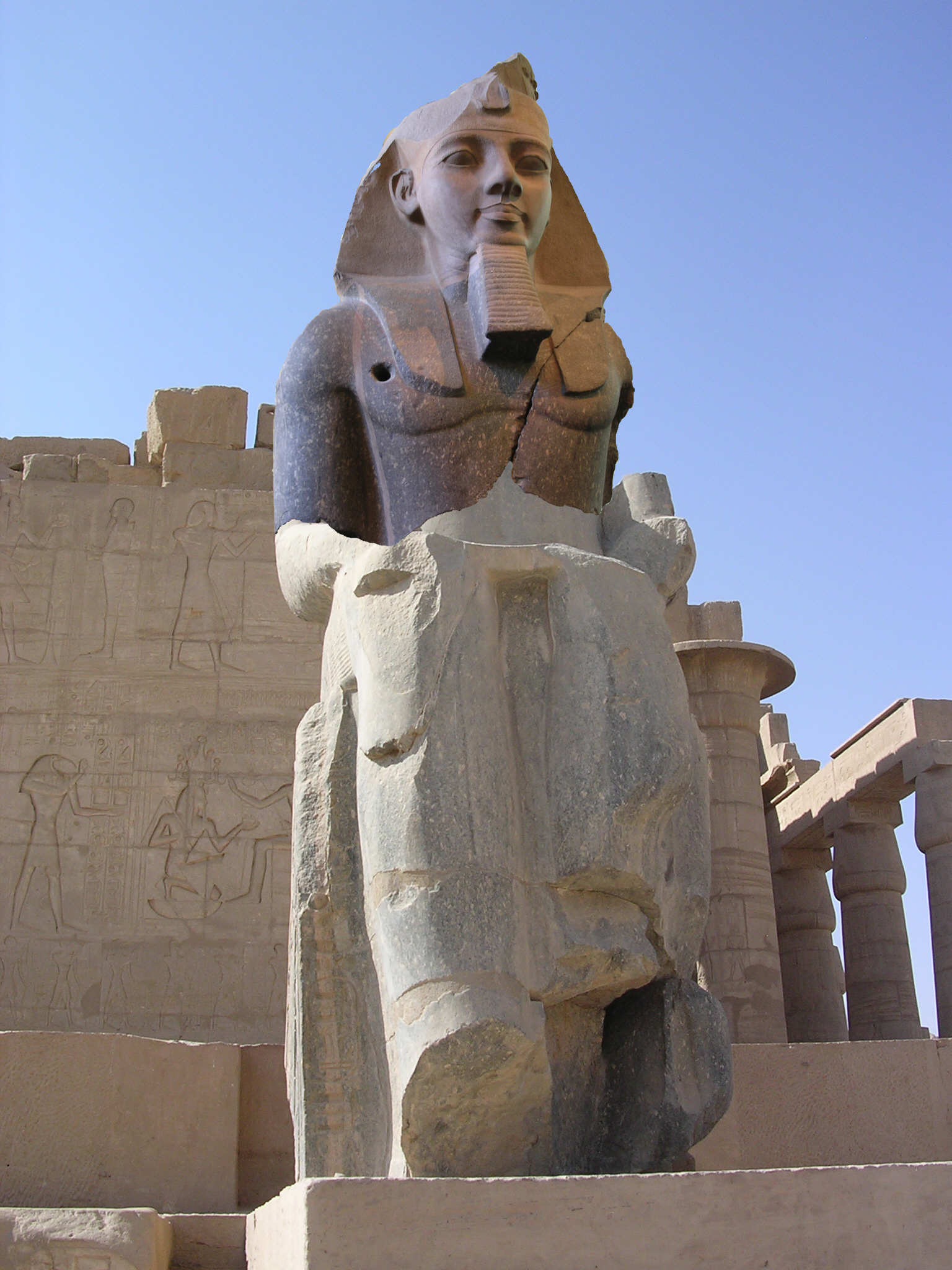
The Younger Memnon in the British Museum digitally restored to its base in the Ramesseum

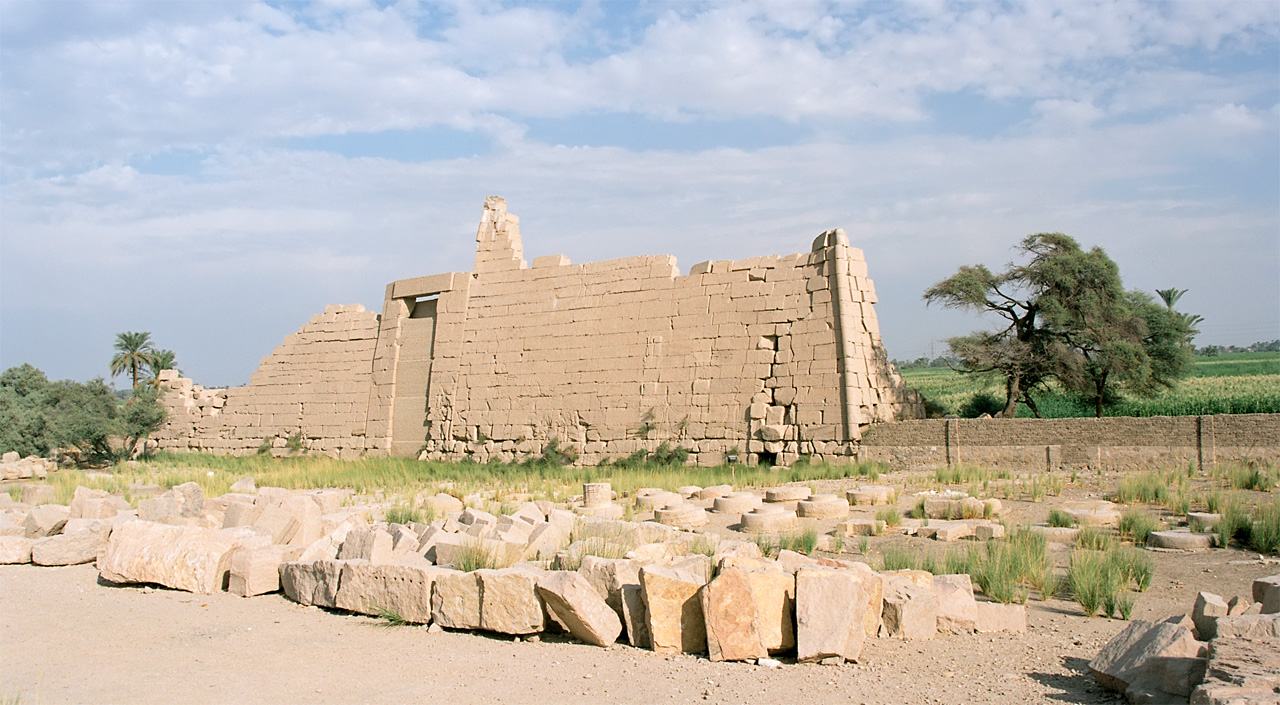
Pylon of Ramesseum

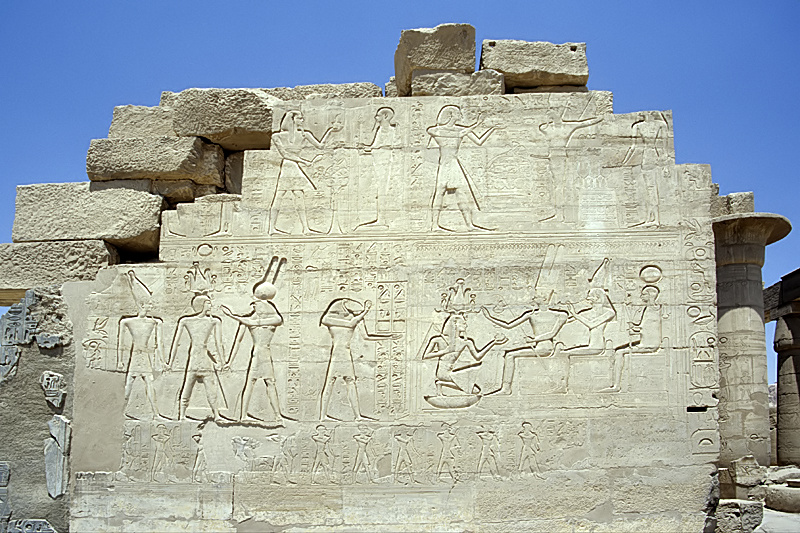
Relief in the Ramesseum

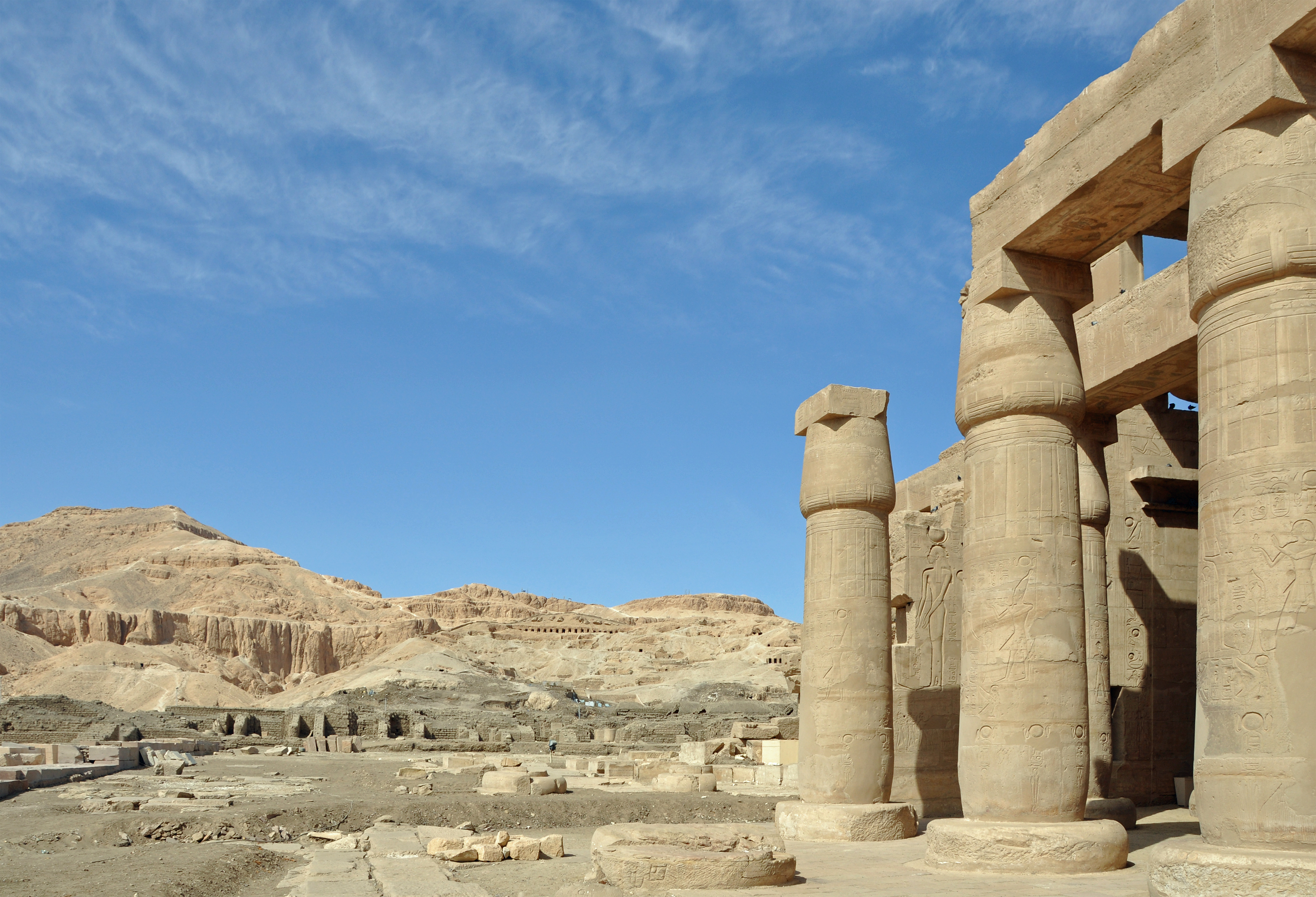
Ramesseum and surroundings

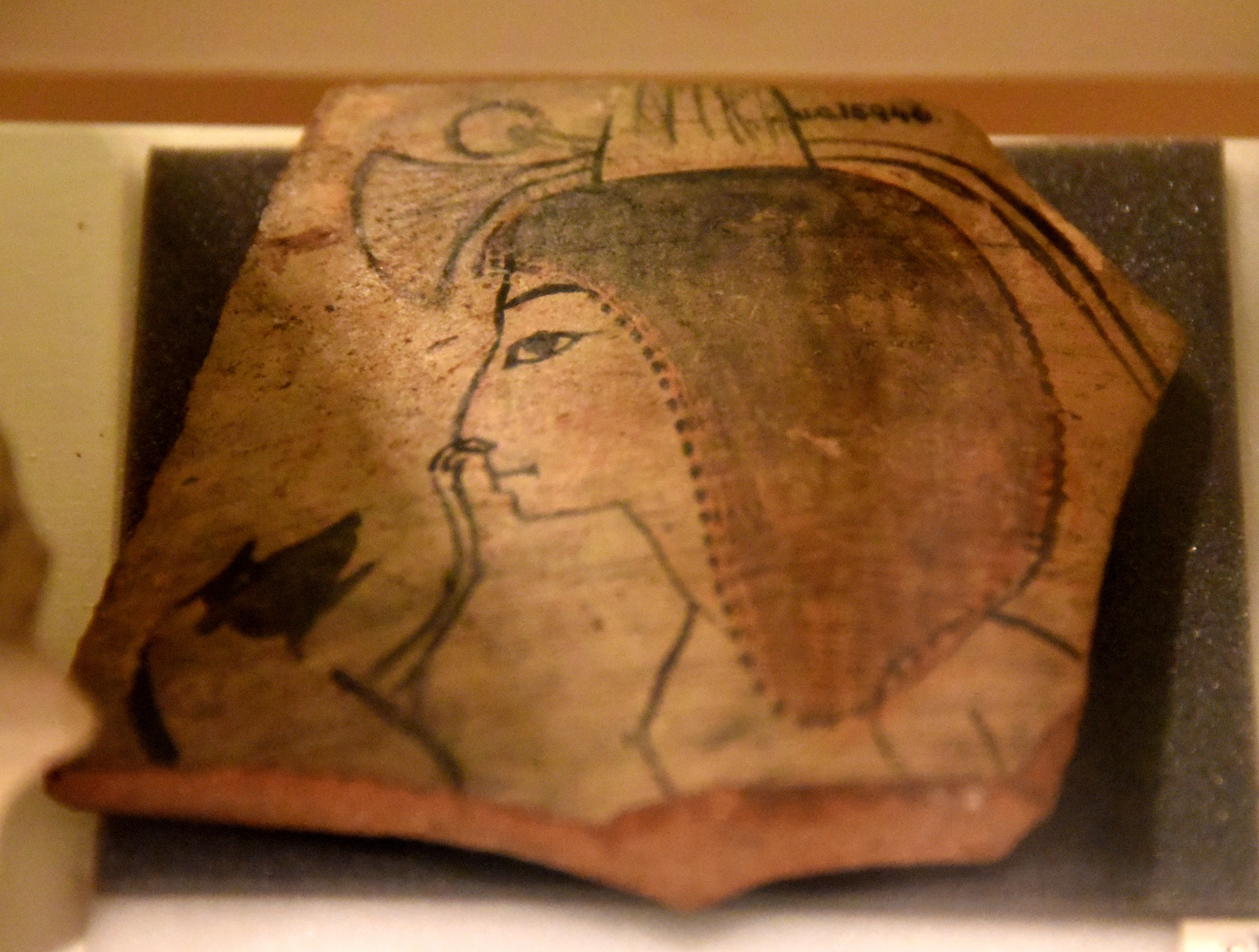
Potsherd showing a monkey scratching a girl's nose. 20th Dynasty. From the so-called Artists' School at Ramesseum, Thebes, Egypt. The Petrie Museum of Egyptian Archaeology, London

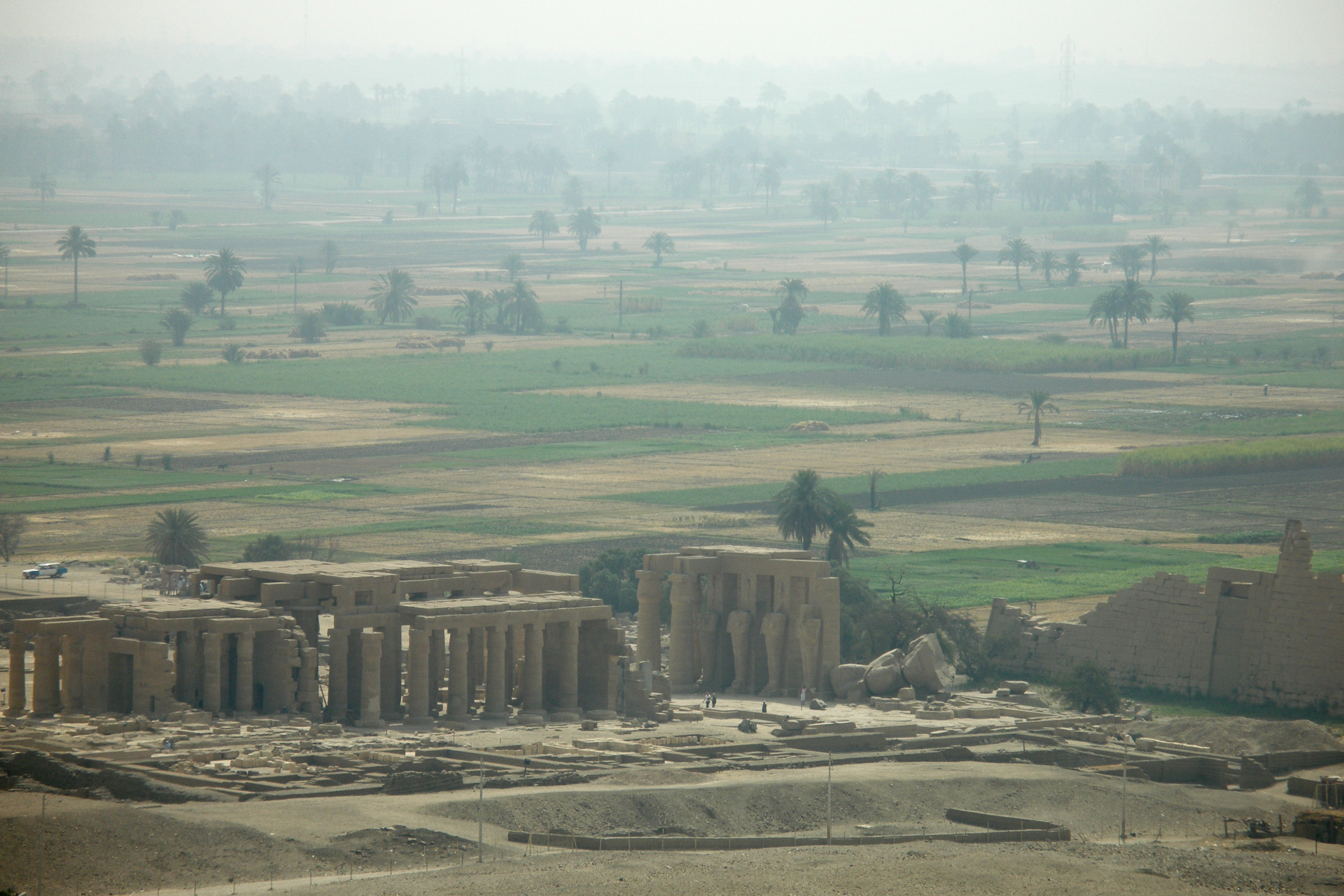
Panoramic view from Theban Hills.

== See also ==
- Ramesseum magician's box
- List of largest monoliths in the world

== Sources ==
- El-Derby, Abdou A.O.D.; Elyamani, Ahmed (2016-02-29). "The Adobe Barrel Vaulted Structures In Ancient Egypt: A Study Of Two Case Studies For Conservation Purposes". Mediterranean Archaeology and Archaeometry. 16 (1): 295–315. doi:10.5281/ZENODO.46361.
- Woodman, Francis; Bloom, Jonathan M. (2003). "Arch". Oxford Art Online. Oxford University Press. doi:10.1093/gao/9781884446054.article.t003657. ISBN 978-1-884446-05-4.
