= Mortuary temple =

Temples beside royal tombs in Ancient Egypt

Mortuary temples (or funerary temples) were temples that were erected adjacent to, or in the vicinity of, royal tombs in Ancient Egypt. The temples were designed to commemorate the reign of the Pharaoh under whom they were constructed, as well as for use by the king's cult after death. These temples were also used to make sacrifices of food and animals.

A mortuary temple is categorized as a monument.

== History ==
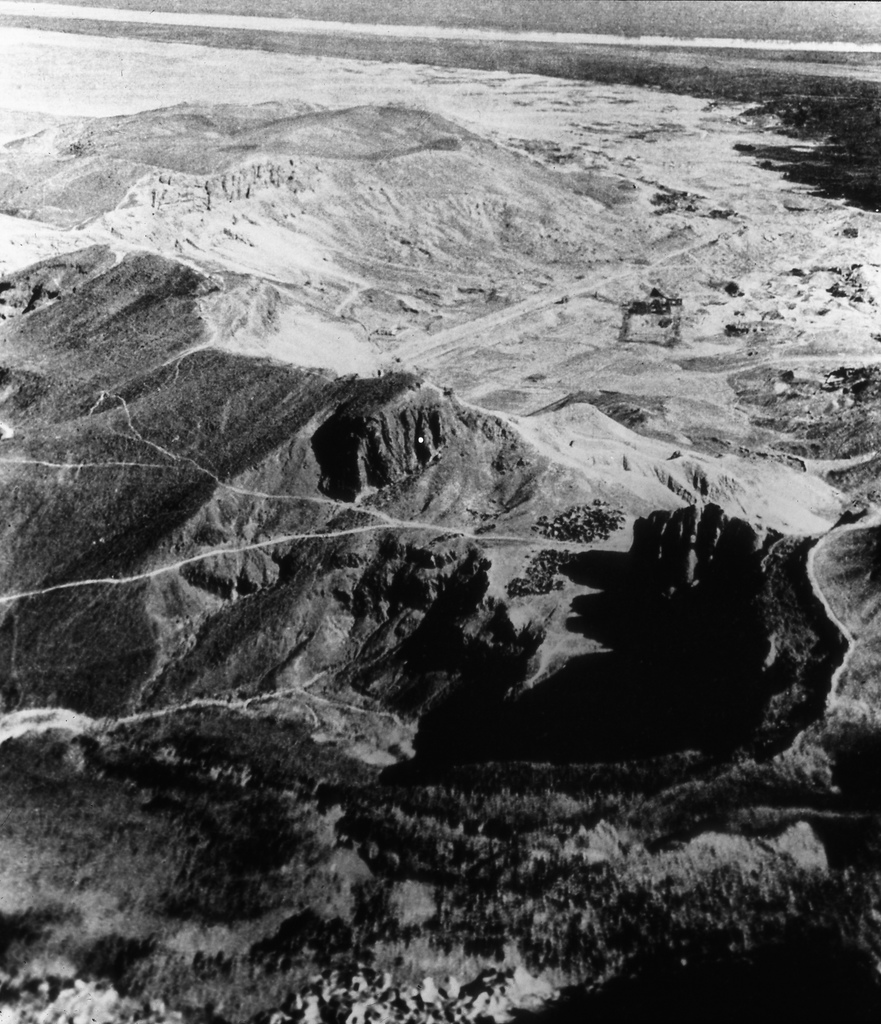
Deir el-Bahari

Mortuary temples were built around pyramids in the Old Kingdom and Middle Kingdom. However, once the New Kingdom pharaohs began constructing tombs in the Valley of the Kings, they built their mortuary temples separately. These New Kingdom temples were called "mansions of millions of years" by the Egyptians.

The mortuary temples were also used as a resting place for the boat of Amun at the time of the Beautiful Festival of the Valley, during which the cult statue of the deity visited the west bank of Thebes.

The king wanted to build his mortuary temple so that he could continue to carry out his cult even after he died.

Some of the first mortuary temples were built with mud, bricks, or reeds; these temples were discovered through artwork including pottery.

The first mortuary temple was built for Amenhotep I of the 18th Dynasty during the New Kingdom. Several other rulers of this dynasty built temples for the same purpose, the best known being those at Deir el-Bahari, where Hatshepsut built beside the funerary temple of Mentuhotep II, and that of Amenhotep III, of which the only major extant remains are the Colossi of Memnon.

The mortuary temple of Hatshesput was built around 1490 B.C. It is the only royal funerary temple from the time period to remain in good condition. Later rulers of the 18th Dynasty either failed to build here at all or, in the case of Tutankhamun, Ay, and Horemheb, their construction was not completed. The 19th Dynasty ruler Seti I constructed his mortuary temple at what is now known as Gurna. Part of his "Glorious temple of Seti Merenptah in the field of Amun which resides at the West of Thebes" was dedicated to his father Ramesses I, whose short reign prevented him from building his own, and was completed by his son Ramesses II.

Ramesses II constructed his own temple, referred to as the Ramesseum (a name given to it by Champollion in 1829): "Temple of a million years of Usermaatre Setepenre which is linked with Thebes-the-Quoted in the Field of Amun, in the West".

Much later, during the 20th Dynasty, Ramesses III constructed his own temple at Medinet Habu.

== Mortuary Temple of Amenhotep III ==
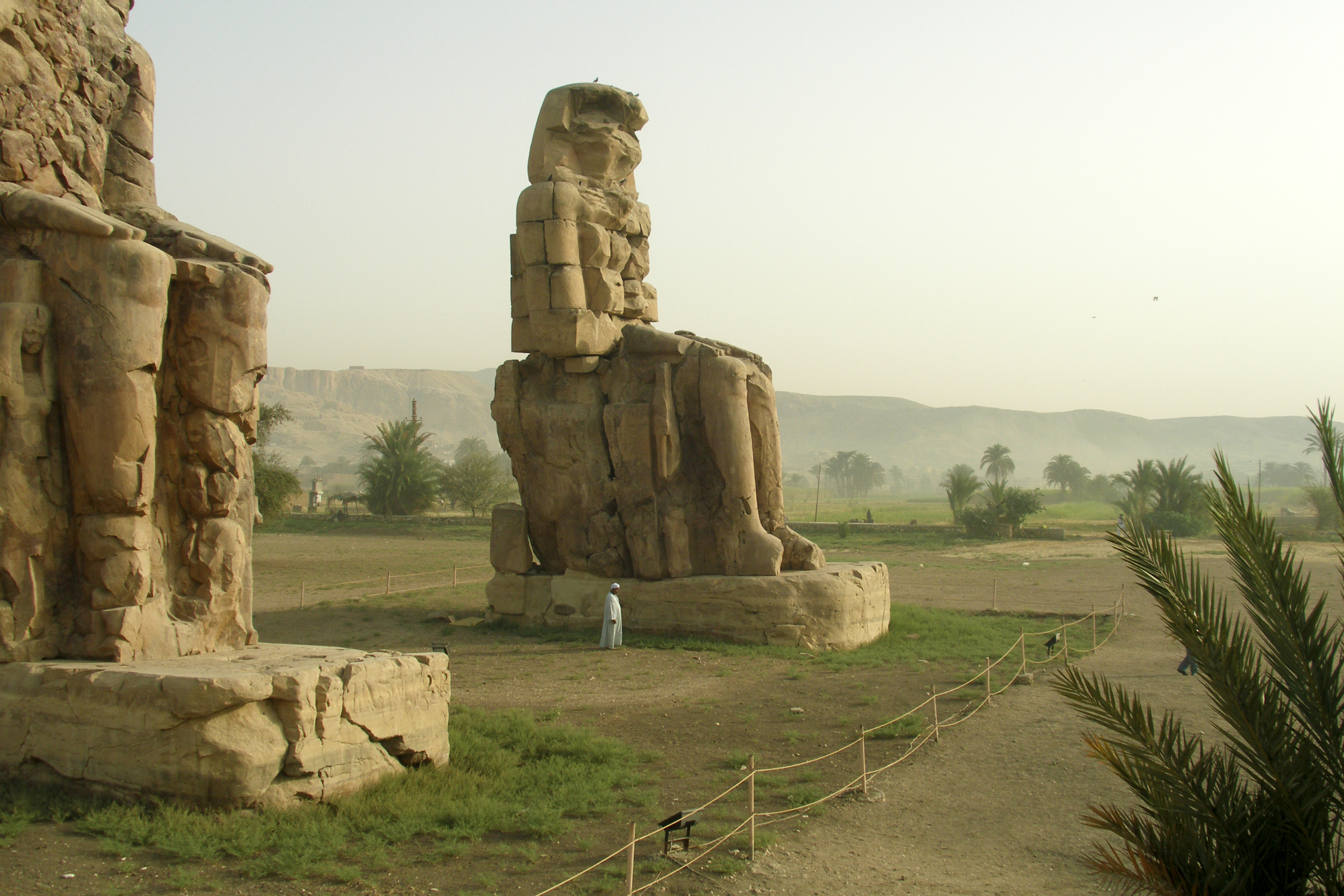
The Colossi of Memnon at the site of the mortuary temple of Amenhotep III

This was the largest mortuary temple to be built. The construction began during the reign of Amenhotep II and continued to be changed by Amenhotep III. There is evidence that he changed some of it for his daughter Sitamun. The temple had gates, a hall, a courtyard, sphinxes and a list of Amenhotep III's achievements when he was king. The temple is 100m by 600m.

It is believed that this temple was also constructed for celebration hosted by Amenhotep III. One symbolic feature in this temple was its correlation with the floods. It was designed so that all outer courts and halls would flood except for the inner hall. It was designed around their belief of the emergence of the world. When inside, you could see yourself be able to be let out again after the tide went back down.

=== Discovery and preservation ===
Scientists began to work on conserving the temple around the 1950s. It did not go so well, as it is buried in mud, has plants growing around it, and has been vandalized.

This temple was particularly destroyed compared to others because it is so close to the Nile. The temple had been flooded countless times since it was built leading to a lot of damage. In order to prevent more water damage a drainage system was built. This helps to release the saltwater that is hurting this historical site.

== Mortuary Temple of Hatshepsut ==
The mortuary temple of Hatshepsut was built around 1490 B.C. It is the only royal funerary temple from the time period to remain in good condition. This temple is connected to two others temples: the temple of King Mentuhotep II and the temple of King Thutmose III.

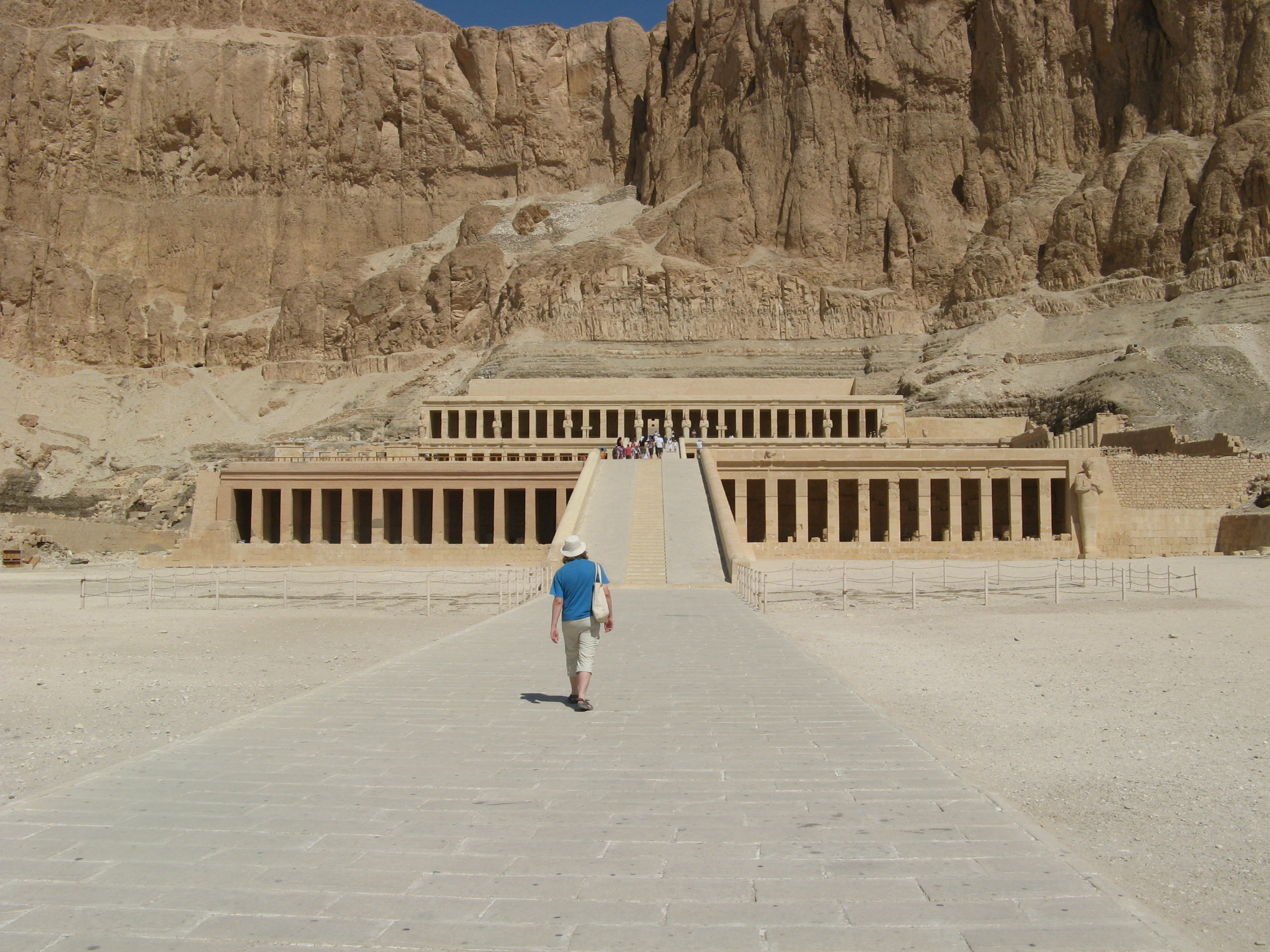
Temple of Hatshepsut

Hatshepsut's temple was inspired by the mortuary temple of Mentuhotep II. The queen wanted to build this copy of a temple much grander and right next to it. As queen, she did this to improve her public image. Her steward Senenmut designed the temple for her. He copied the Mentuhotep II temple, but made everything grander. Hatshepsut inscribed her divine conception on the walls of the temple, describing that the god Amun fathered her.

=== Restoration ===
A Polish archaeological mission began maintaining this temple in 1968. The temple had been destroyed by rocks falling on top of it from the cliffs above, as you can see in the picture of the temple.

== Mortuary Temple of Seti I ==
The 19th Dynasty ruler Seti I constructed his mortuary temple at what is now known as Gurna. This temple is in upper Egypt. This temple was used for the worship of the god Osiris, who was the god of the afterlife.

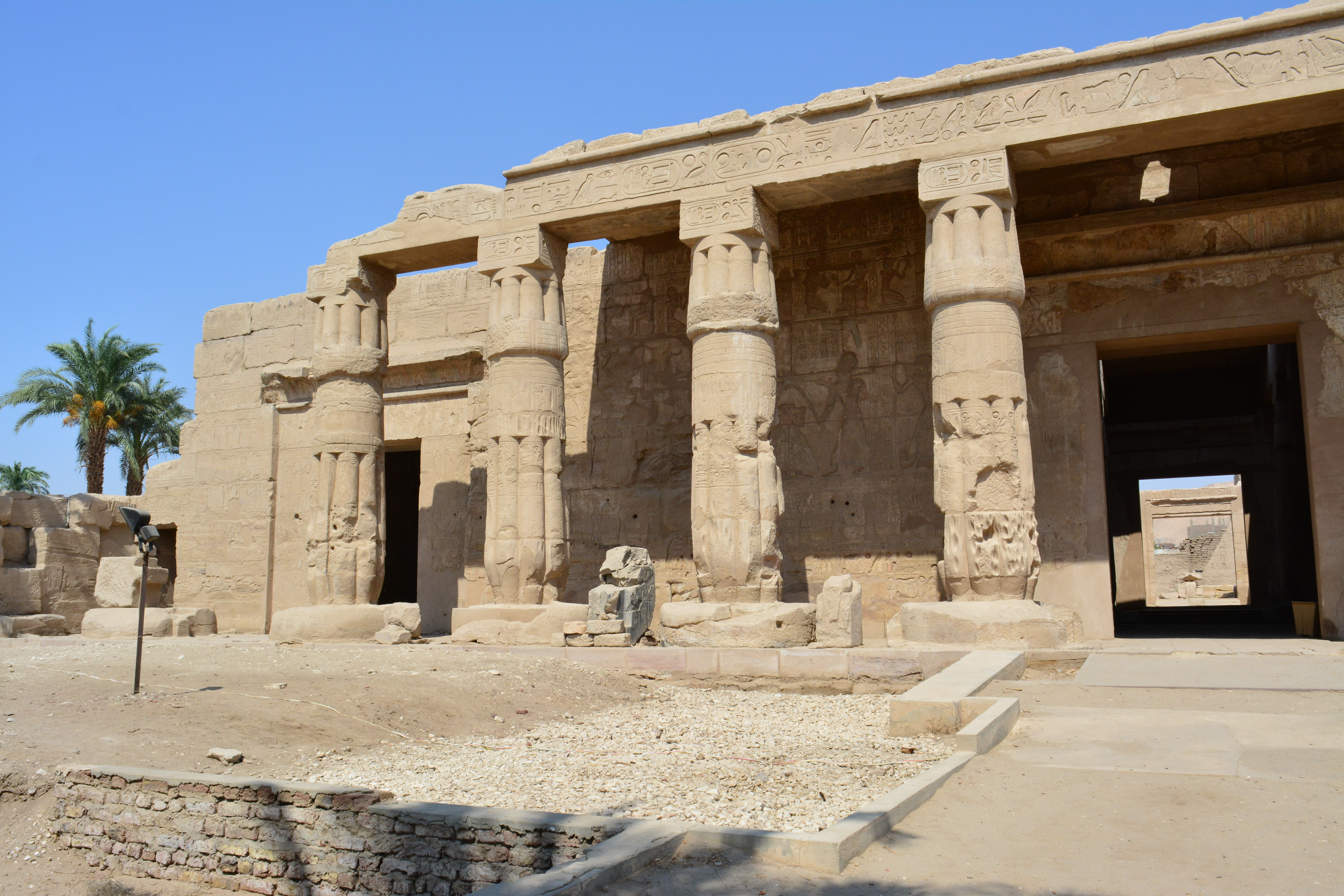
Temple of Seti

Later rulers of the 18th Dynasty either failed to build here at all or, in the case of Tutankhamun, Ay, and Horemheb, their construction was not completed. Part of his "Glorious temple of Seti Merenptah in the field of Amun which resides at the "West of Thebes" was dedicated to his father Ramesses I, whose short reign prevented him from building his own, and was completed by his son Ramesses II.

=== Design of the temple ===
This temple was built out of limestone. The courtyard is decorated with scenes from a battle. The temple consists of three entrances, thirty-six pillars, and a grand hypostyle hall, defined by Britannica as an interior space whose roof rests on pillars or columns. This hall is used for worshiping the gods.

== Mortuary Temple of Hawara ==
This temple is right next to the Hawara pyramid. In Late Antiquity (284AD - 700AD) it was considered one of the wonders of the world. This temple has a complicated labyrinth in it. It has been said that you could not enter without a guide, because it is simply too confusing. This temple had twelve main courts with rooms, galleries, and courtyards. The dimensions of the temple were about 120m by 300m.

The temple was discovered by Richard Lepsius around 1840. The area around the temple has been almost completely demolished, but he was able to make many discoveries through portraits.

== Ramesses II ==
Ramesses II constructed his own temple, referred to as the Ramesseum (a name given to it by Champollion in 1829): "Temple of a million years of Usermaatre Setepenre which is linked with Thebes-the-Quoted in the Field of Amun, in the West". He built this temple meant for himself after he died. It is located on the west bank of the Nile. The temple has a 20-meter statue of Ramses II. The temple itself is 210 by 178 meters. This was the first temple of its kind to be built out of stone instead of mudbrick.

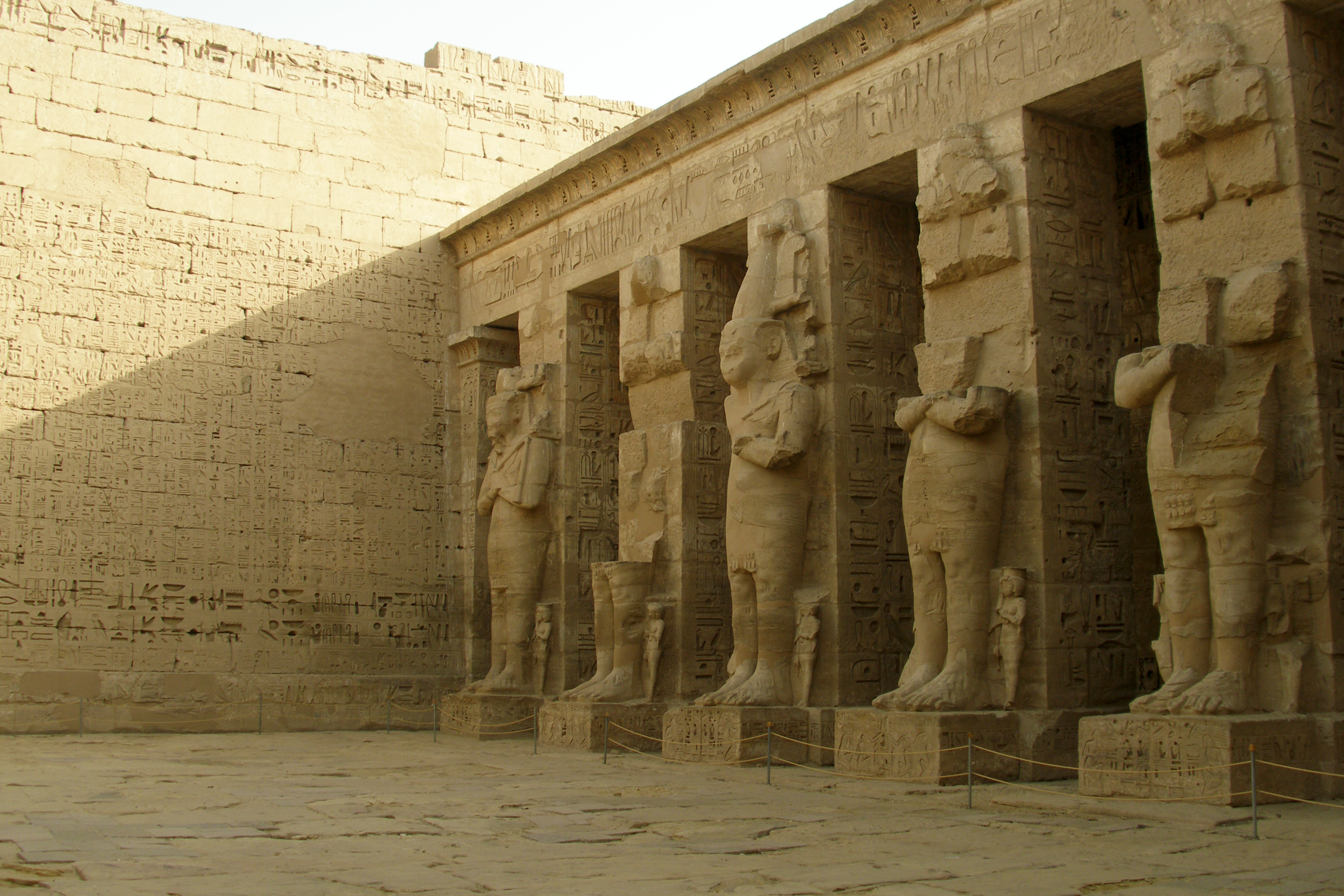
Temple of Ramesses

Much later, during the 20th Dynasty, Ramesses III constructed his own temple at Medinet Habu.

This temple has become very deteriorated over time. It is located in the floodplain of the Nile which has led to erosion. Some of the buildings around this temple were also used for stone so much of it was purposefully destroyed.

=== Restoration ===
The temple was discovered in 1798 during Napoleon's invasion. Most of this temple needed to be rebuilt. In the second palace there were only a few of the stone parts left. Archeologists used iron clamps and brick to rebuild a foundation for the temple.

== Temple of Khufu ==
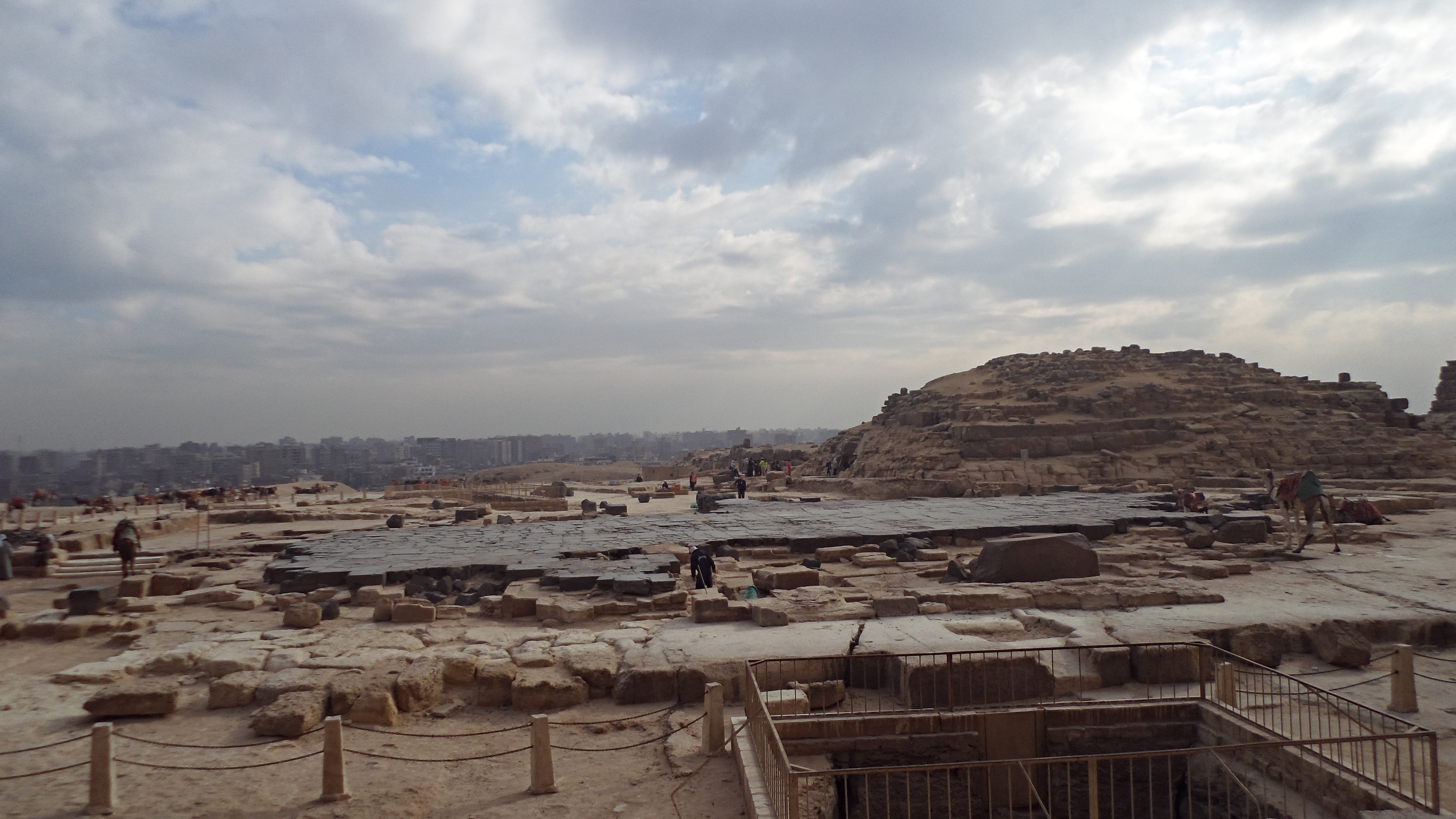
Khufu Temple and Pyramid

This mortuary temple is located at the Giza Complex, which is where some of the most famous pyramids are located. This mortuary temple is up against the eastern side of the Khufu pyramid.

It is believed that in the layout that there was a false door and a correct door to the area where the king worshiped gods. There were two other temples in this complex and the mortuary temple of Khufu had a smaller offering place.

Much of the temple was destroyed and its stone looted. Only a large section of the flooring remains which was reconstructed in the 20th century.
